= HMS Sorceress =

Destroyer of the Royal Navy

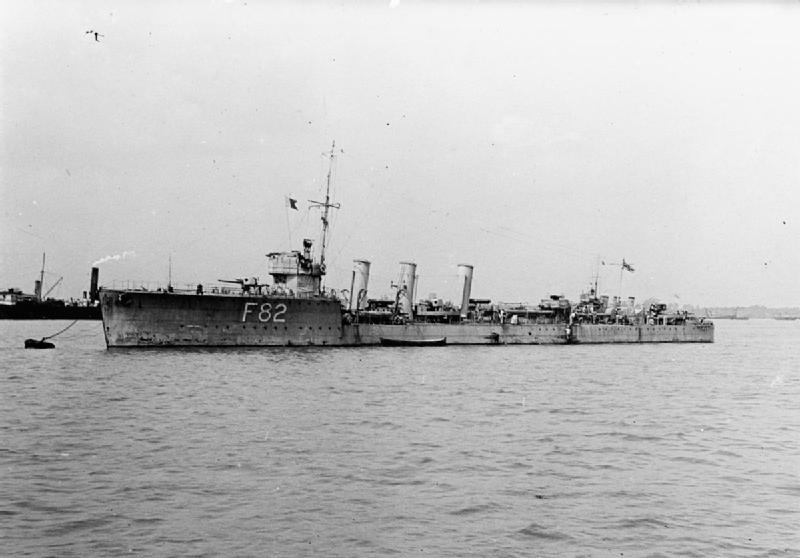
- Sistership HMS Thisbe

History

United Kingdom
- Name: HMS Sorceress
- Builder: Swan Hunter & Wigham Richardson, Wallsend
- Yard number: 1013
- Laid down: 13 November 1915
- Launched: 29 August 1916
- Commissioned: 4 December 1916
- Out of service: 29 April 1927
- Fate: Sold to be broken up

General characteristics
- Class & type: R-class destroyer
- Displacement: 975 long tons (991 t) normal; 1,035 long tons (1,052 t) deep load
- Length: 265 ft (80.8 m) p.p.
- Beam: 26 ft 9 in (8.15 m)
- Draught: 9 ft 10 in (3.00 m)
- Propulsion: 3 Brown-Curtis boilers; 2 geared Parsons steam turbines, 27,000 shp (20,000 kW)
- Speed: 36 knots (41.4 mph; 66.7 km/h)
- Range: 3,440 nmi (6,370 km) at 15 kn (28 km/h)
- Complement: 82
- Armament: 3 × QF 4-inch (101.6 mm) Mark IV guns, mounting P Mk. IX; 1 × single 2-pounder (40-mm) "pom-pom" Mk. II anti-aircraft gun; 4 × 21 in (533 mm) torpedo tubes (2×2)

HMS Sorceress was an R-class destroyer which served with the Royal Navy during World War I. Launched on 29 August 1916, the vessel operated as part of the Grand Fleet until it was disbanded in 1919. In 1917, the ship took part in action against the German Sixth Destroyer Flotilla and was one of those credited with bounty for the German auxiliary cruiser Konprinz Willhelm. The destroyer was sold to be broken up on 29 April 1927.

== Design and development ==
Sorceress was one of seventeen R-class destroyers ordered by the British Admiralty in July 1915 as part of the Sixth War Construction Programme. The design was generally similar to the preceding M class, but differed in having geared steam turbines, a different location for the central gun and minor changes to improve seakeeping.

The destroyer was 265 feet (80.77 m) long between perpendiculars, with a beam of 26 feet 9 inches (8.15 m) and a draught of 9 feet 10 inches (3.00 m). Displacement was 975 long tons (991 t) normal and 1,035 long tons (1,052 t) deep load. Power was provided by three Yarrow boilers feeding two Brown-Curtis geared steam turbines rated at 27,000 shaft horsepower (20,000 kW) and driving two shafts, to give a design speed of 36 knots (67 km/h; 41 mph). Three funnels were fitted. A fuel load of 296 long tons (301 t) of oil was carried, giving a design range of 3,450 nautical miles (6,390 km; 3,970 mi) at 15 knots (28 km/h; 17 mph).

Armament consisted of three 4 in (100 mm) Mk IV QF guns on the ship's centreline, with one on the forecastle, one aft on a raised platform and one between the second and third funnels. A single 2-pounder (40 mm) pom-pom anti-aircraft gun was carried, while torpedo armament consisted of two twin rotating torpedo tubes for 21 in (533 mm) torpedoes. The ship had a complement of 82 officers and ratings.

== Construction and career ==
Sorceress was laid down by Swan Hunter & Wigham Richardson at Wallsend on the River Tyne on 13 November 1915 and given the yard number 1013. The destroyer was launched on 29 August 1916 and completed on 4 December.

On commissioning, Sorceress joined the Fifteenth Destroyer Flotilla of the Grand Fleet. On 23 January 1917, the destroyer formed part of a flotilla, led by destroyer leader Grenville, that intercepted the German Sixth Destroyer Flotilla led by V26. Sorceress took a minor part in the action, which ended with the sinking of the destroyer Simoom. On 12 February 1917, four German large torpedo boats attacked the regular convoy between Britain and Norway, overwhelming the escort of two destroyers (Partridge and Pellew) and four naval trawlers. All the escort except Pellew were sunk, as were all six merchant ships. Sorceress picked up three survivors from one of the trawlers, Livingstone, later that day. The vessel was credited with bounty for the German auxiliary cruiser Konprinz Willhelm on 2 November along with Parker, Ready, Rigorous, Rocket, Rob Roy and Trenchant.

In September 1919, Sorceress was transferred from the Fourth Destroyer Flotilla, where she was replaced by Shamrock, to the Nore Destroyer Flotilla. After the Grand Fleet was disbanded, the ship was recommissioned on 19 November 1919. In 1923, the Royal Navy decided to scrap many of the older destroyers in preparation for the introduction of newer and larger vessels. Sorceress was decommissioned and sold to Thos. W. Ward of Sheffield to be broken up on 29 April 1927.

== Pennant numbers ==
| Pennant number | Date |
|---|---|
| G93 | January 1917 |
| G94 | January 1918 |
| G68 | January 1919 |
| H66 | November 1919 |

== Bibliography ==
- Bush, Steve; Warlow, Ben (2021). Pendant Numbers of the Royal Navy: A Complete History of the Allocation of Pendant Numbers to Royal Navy Warships & Auxiliaries. Barnsley: Seaforth Publishing. ISBN 978-1-526793-78-2.
- Colledge, J.J.; Warlow, Ben (2010). Ships of the Royal Navy: The Complete Record of All Fighting Ships of the Royal Navy. Haverhill: Casemate. ISBN 978-1-93514-907-1.
- Dittmar, F.J.; Colledge, J.J. (1972). British Warships 1914–1919. Shepperton: Ian Allan. ISBN 978-0-71100-380-4.
- Friedman, Norman (2009). British Destroyers: From Earliest Days to the First World War. Barnsley: Seaforth Publishing. ISBN 978-1-84832-049-9.
- Gardiner, Robert; Gray, Randal, eds. (1985). Conway's All the World's Fighting Ships 1906–1921. London: Conway Maritime Press. ISBN 978-0-85177-245-5.
- Hurd, Archibald (1929). The Merchant Navy Vol. III. History of the Great War. London: John Murray.
- Manning, Thomas Davys; Walker, Charles Frederick (1959). British Warship Names. London: Putnam. OCLC 780274698.
- Manning, T. D. (1961). The British Destroyer. London: Putnam.
- March, Edgar J. (1966). British Destroyers: A History of Development, 1892–1953; Drawn by Admiralty Permission From Official Records & Returns, Ships' Covers & Building Plans. London: Seeley Service. OCLC 164893555.
- Monograph No. 34: Home Waters Part VIII: December 1916 to April 1917 (PDF). Naval Staff Monographs (Historical). Vol. XVIII. Naval Staff, Training and Staff Duties Division. 1933.
- Newbolt, Henry (1928). Naval Operations: Vol. IV. History of the Great War. London: Longmans, Green and Co. OCLC 220475138.
- Newbolt, Henry (1931). Naval Operations Vol. V. History of the Great War. London: Longmans, Green and Co.
- Parkes, Oscar; Prendergast, Maurice (1969). Jane's Fighting Ships 1919. Newton Abbott: David & Charles. OCLC 907574860.
