= HMS Parker =

Destroyer of the Royal Navy

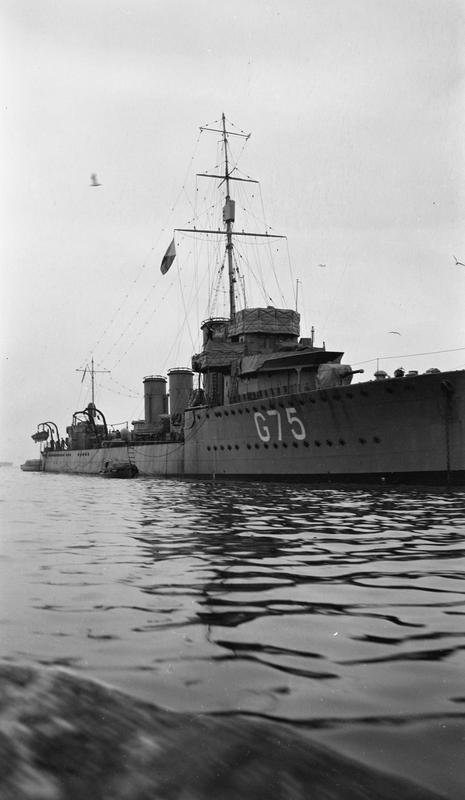
- HMS Parker in Gulter Sound in May 1917

History

United Kingdom
- Ordered: February 1915
- Builder: Cammell Laird, Birkenhead
- Laid down: 19 June 1915
- Launched: 17 August 1916
- Commissioned: 13 November 1916
- Fate: Sold for scrap 15 November 1921

General characteristics
- Class & type: Parker-class leader
- Displacement: 1,660–1,673 long tons (1,687–1,700 t)
- Length: 325 ft (99.1 m) oa; 315 ft (96.0 m) pp
- Beam: 31 ft 9 in (9.7 m)
- Draught: 12 ft (3.7 m) maximum
- Propulsion: 4 × Yarrow boilers, Parsons turbines, 3 shafts; 36,000 shaft horsepower (27,000 kW)
- Speed: 34 kn (63 km/h; 39 mph)
- Range: 4,920 nautical miles (9,110 km; 5,660 mi) at 15 knots (28 km/h; 17 mph)
- Complement: 116
- Armament: 4 × single QF 4-inch Mark IV guns; 2 × 2-pounder "pom-pom" guns; 2 × twin 21 inch (533 mm) torpedo tube sets; 2 × depth charge chutes

HMS Parker (originally Frobisher) was a Parker-class flotilla leader of the British Royal Navy, and the lead ship of her class. She was built by Cammell Laird during the First World War, being launched on 16 August 1916 and completing on 13 December that year. Parker served with the Grand Fleet for the rest of the war, which she survived. The ship was sold for scrap in November 1921.

== Construction and design ==
In February 1915, the British Admiralty ordered two Parker-class flotilla leaders (i.e. large destroyers intended to lead flotillas of smaller destroyers in action) under the Fourth Emergency War Construction Programme, Parker (originally to be called Frobisher but renamed before the ship was launched) and Grenville, from the Birkenhead shipyard Cammell Laird. The Parker-class (Note: Also known as the improved Marksman-class) was an improved version of the earlier Marksman-class flotilla leader with the forward two funnels of the Marksman-class merged into one and the ships' bridge moved rearwards, allowing an improved gun layout.

The Parkers were 325 feet (99.1 m) long overall and 315 feet (96.0 m) between perpendiculars, with a beam of 31 feet 9 inches (9.7 m) and a draught of 12 feet (3.7 m). Displacement was between 1,660 long tons (1,687 t) and 1,673 long tons (1,700 t) normal (Note: Jane's Fighting Ships of World War I gives a normal displacement of 1,666 long tons (1,693 t) in 1919.) and about 1,900 long tons (1,930 t) full load. Four Yarrow boilers fed steam to three sets of Parsons steam turbines, rated at 36,000 shaft horsepower (27,000 kW) (Note: The machinery gave 37,865 shp (28,236 kW) during sea trials.) and giving a speed of 34 knots (63 km/h; 39 mph). Three funnels were fitted. 515 long tons (523 t) of oil fuel were carried, giving a range of 4,290 nautical miles (7,950 km; 4,940 mi) at 15 knots (28 km/h; 17 mph).

The ship's main gun armament consisted of four QF 4-inch (102 mm) Mk IV guns mounted on the ships centreline, with the forward two guns superfiring so that one could fire over the other, with one gun between the second and third funnel and one aft. Two 2-pounder (40 mm) "pom-pom" anti-aircraft guns were fitted, while torpedo armament consisted of two sets of twin 21 inch (533 mm) torpedo tubes. The standard anti-submarine armament for flotilla leaders such as Parker from June 1916 onwards was two Type D depth charges on chutes, although the number of depth charges tended to increased as the war progressed and the importance of anti-submarine operations grew. The ship's complement was 116 officers and men.

Parker, named for Admiral Peter Parker, was laid down on 19 June 1915 and launched on 17 August 1916. She was commissioned on 13 November 1916.

== Service ==
On commissioning, Parker joined the 15th Destroyer Flotilla of the Grand Fleet at Scapa Flow as leader with sister ship Grenville. From 15 June 1917 the destroyers and submarines of the Grand Fleet took part in Operation BB, a large scale operation against German submarines, with 53 destroyers and leaders together with 17 submarines deployed on offensive patrols on the transit route for the Germans from the North Sea and around the Orkney and Shetland Islands to the Western Approaches. Parker led twelve destroyers of the 15th Flotilla on patrol to the east of Shetland. Overall, 61 sightings were made of German submarines were made by the destroyers and submarines of the Grand Fleet until the operation ended on 24 June, of which 12 resulted in attacks on the submarines, but no submarines were sunk or damaged. In July 1917, the 15th Flotilla moved to Rosyth. On 20 August 1917, Parker carried out an attack against a German submarine with depth charges. In October 1917, Parker formed part of a large-scale operation, involving 30 cruisers and 54 destroyers deployed in eight groups across the North Sea in an attempt to stop a suspected sortie by German naval forces, with Gabriel (along with Rigorous, Rocket, Rowena, Sabrina and Trenchant) operating with the 2nd Light Cruiser Squadron. Despite these countermeasures, the two German light cruisers Bremse and Brummer managed to evade the patrols and attacked the regular convoy between Norway and Britain on 17 October, sinking nine merchant ships and two destroyers, Mary Rose and Strongbow before returning safely to Germany.

From 31 October to 2 November 1917, the 15th Flotilla, led by Parker and supported by the light cruisers Cardiff, Calypso, Ceres and Caradoc, made a sortie into the Kattegat, sinking the German Q-ship K (also known as Kronprinz Willhelm) on 2 November together with nine trawlers. Parker, together with the destroyers Sorceress, Ready, Rigorous, Rocket, Rob Roy and Trenchant, was awarded a bounty for sinking K. Parker remained part of the 15th Flotilla at the end of the war, and on 21 November 1918, helped to escort the German High Seas Fleet to the Firth of Forth prior to its internment at Scapa Flow. She was paid off into reserve in December 1918, her crew joining the newly commissioned Campbell.

By July 1919, Parker was back in commission with the 5th Destroyer Flotilla of the Home Fleet, detached for operations in Irish waters. She remained in Irish waters until August 1919, and was reduced to reserve at Chatham in December 1919.

== Fate ==
Parker was placed on the disposal list in February 1921 and was sold as part of a batch of nine destroyers to the ship breakers John Cashmore Ltd on 15 November 1921. The ship was removed from Chatham on 16 May 1923 for scrapping at Cashmore's Newport works.

== Pennant numbers ==
Pennant number	From	To
H71	1916	March 1917
G75	March 1917	January 1918
G95	January 1918	April 1918
G75	April 1918	October 1919
F10	November 1919	-
