= HMS Salmon (1916) =

British R-Class destroyer

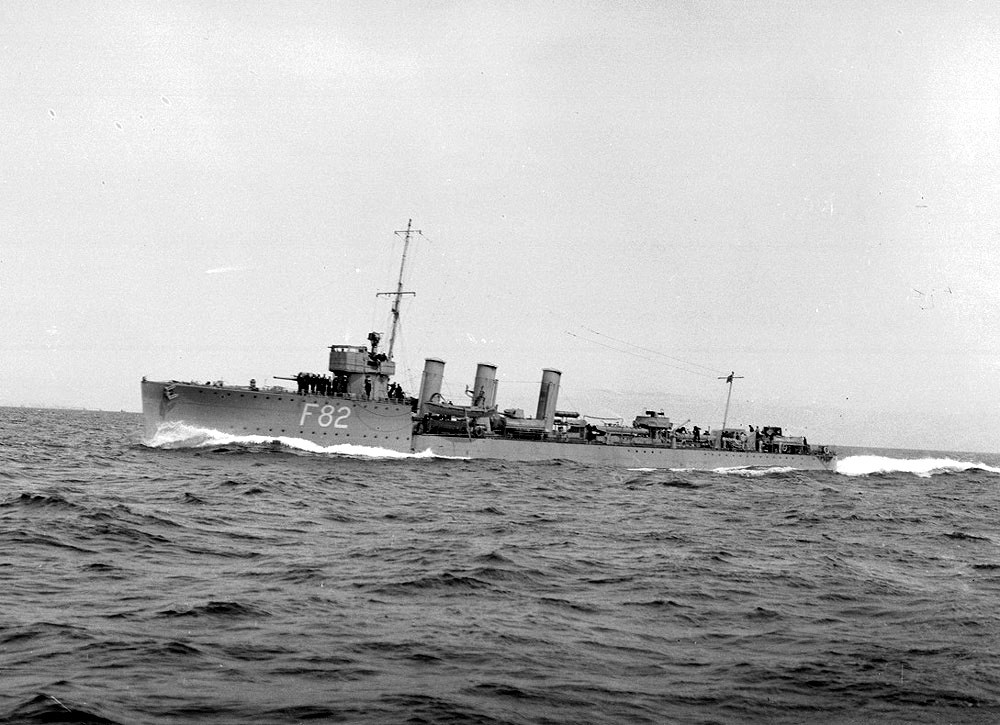
- Sister ship HMS Thisbe at sea in 1917

History

United Kingdom
- Name: HMS Salmon
- Ordered: July 1915
- Builder: Harland & Wolff, Govan
- Laid down: 27 August 1915
- Launched: 7 October 1916
- Completed: 20 December 1916
- Out of service: 28 January 1937
- Fate: Sold to be broken up

General characteristics
- Class & type: R-class destroyer
- Displacement: 975 long tons (991 t) (normal); 1,173 long tons (1,192 t) (deep load)
- Length: 265 ft (81 m) (p.p.)
- Beam: 26 ft 9 in (8 m)
- Draught: 9 ft (3 m)
- Installed power: 3 Yarrow boilers, 27,000 shp (20,000 kW)
- Propulsion: 2 geared Brown-Curtis steam turbines, 2 shafts
- Speed: 36 knots (67 km/h; 41 mph)
- Range: 3,450 nmi (6,390 km; 3,970 mi) at 15 knots (28 km/h; 17 mph)
- Complement: 82
- Armament: 3 × single QF 4 in (102 mm) Mark IV guns; 1 × single 2-pdr 40 mm (2 in) AA gun; 2 × twin 21 in (533 mm) torpedo tubes

HMS Salmon was an R-class destroyer that served in the Royal Navy during the First World War. The R class were an improvement on the previous M class with geared steam turbines to improve efficiency. Launched by Harland & Wolff at Govan in 1916, Salmon served with the Fifteenth Destroyer Flotilla of the Grand Fleet. The destroyer escorted convoys between Britain and Scandinavia. At the end of the war, the vessel was allocated to the Home Fleet but was given a reduced crew in 1919 as there was no longer the need for as many active ships in the navy. The destroyer subsequently helped in the searches following the loss of the submarines H47 and M2, as well as rescuing 10 members of the crew of the steamer Ioannois Fafalios, sunk after colliding with the freighter Bacchus. In 1933, Salmon was renamed Sable, which ironically had previously been the name of another R-class destroyer that had collided with the vessel in 1917, but only served three years with the new name. The destroyer was sold as part-payment in exchange for the liner Majestic in 1937 and broken up.

== Design and development ==
Salmon was one of eight R-class destroyers ordered by the British Admiralty in December 1915 as part of the Seventh War Programme. The design was generally similar to the preceding M class, but differed in having geared steam turbines, the aft gun mounted on a raised platform and minor changes to improve seakeeping.

The destroyer had a length of 265 feet (81 m) between perpendiculars and 276 feet (84 m) overall, a beam of 26 feet 9 inches (8 m) and a draught of 9 feet (3 m). Displacement was 975 long tons (991 t) normal and 1,173 long tons (1,192 t) deep load. Power was provided by three Yarrow boilers feeding two Brown-Curtis geared turbines rated at 27,000 shaft horsepower (20,000 kW) and driving two shafts, to give a design speed of 36 knots (67 km/h; 41 mph). Three funnels were fitted. A total of 296 long tons (301 t) of fuel oil was carried which gave a design range of 3,450 nautical miles (6,390 km; 3,970 mi) at 15 knots (28 km/h; 17 mph).

Armament consisted of three single 4 in (102 mm) Mk IV guns on the ship's centreline, with one on the forecastle, one aft on a raised platform and one between the second and third funnels. A single 2-pounder 40 mm (2 in) "pom-pom" anti-aircraft gun was carried, while torpedo armament consisted of two twin mounts for 21 in (533 mm) torpedoes. The ship had a complement of 82 officers and ratings.

== Construction and career ==
Laid down by Harland & Wolff at their shipyard in Govan on 27 August 1915, Salmon was launched on 7 October the following year and completed on 20 December. The destroyer was the second to carry the name, and the first to be built at the yard. On commissioning, Salmon joined the Fifteenth Destroyer Flotilla of the Grand Fleet based at Scapa Flow. The destroyer was assigned to escort convoys that travelled between Britain and Scandinavia, protecting them from German submarines. By 31 March 1917, the flotilla had moved to Rosyth. During that time, the German submarine tactics had changed from using gunfire, so that, by April, over half of the vessels sunk had been hit by torpedoes. This also led to an increase in the number of merchant ships lost. The flotilla then took part in anti-submarine patrols between 15 and 24 June 1917. Although sixty-one sightings of submarines and twelve attacks were reported during that operation, no submarines were sunk. While on service during the year the ship collided with sister ship Sable, sustaining damage to the bow. Both ships made it successfully back to port.

After the Armistice of 11 November 1918 that ended the war, the Grand Fleet was dissolved and Salmon was moved to the Sixth Destroyer Flotilla of the Home Fleet. However, the navy needed to reduce both the number of ships and the amount of staff to save money. On 15 February 1919, the crew was reduced to the minimum required to keep the ship operational. The destroyer was transferred to the local defence flotilla at Queenstown in Ireland. On 5 December 1921, the destroyer carried the Private Secretary to the Prime Minister, Geoffrey Shakespeare, to Belfast to negotiate the peace that led to the Anglo-Irish Treaty.

Salmon was transferred to the Anti-Submarine Flotilla based at Portland along with fellow destroyers Rowena, Torrid and Thruster. The destroyer was equipped with ASDIC and used in the development of anti-submarine warfare tactics to deal with submerged submarines. At the end of June and beginning of July 1927, the flotilla took part in exercises off Lamlash with the battlecruiser Tiger. Salmon then accompanied Tiger in a search for the drifter Sheen, lost on 21 August. The lost ship was successfully found and towed back to Portland. On 3 April 1928, the four destroyers of the Portland Anti-Submarine Flotilla, including Salmon, undertook a display of speed and dexterity, using depth charges to create a spectacle, for Amanullah Khan, the King of Afghanistan, while he was on a state visit. On 5 May, Salmon rescued 10 crew members of the Greek steamer Ioannois Fafalios which had sunk after colliding with the stores freighter Bacchus. On 9 July the following year, the destroyer was involved in the search for the submarine H47, which had sunk following a collision with the submarine L12. Salmon was also involved in the unsuccessful search for the crew of the submarine M2, sunk on 26 January 1932. During 1933, the destroyer, along with the rest of the flotilla, was transferred to Chatham and given a full crew by 1 June.

On 2 December 1933, Salmon was renamed Sable to release the name for a S-class submarine, Salmon. The destroyer was only the second to be named after the sable, a species of marten. Ironically, the previous holder was the fellow R-class destroyer that Salmon struck in 1917, which had been retired in 1927. The destroyer continued to serve with the Anti-Submarine Flotilla under the new name until April 1936, when the ship was transferred to Devonport and placed in reserve. Subsequently, Sable was given to Thos. W. Ward of Sheffield as part-payment in exchange for the liner Majestic on 28 January 1937 and was broken up.

== Pennant numbers ==
| Pennant number | Date |
|---|---|
| G94 | January 1917 |
| G93 | January 1918 |
| H36 | January 1919 |
| F18 | November 1919 |
| H58 | January 1922 |
