= HMS Sable (1916) =

British R-Class destroyer, WW1

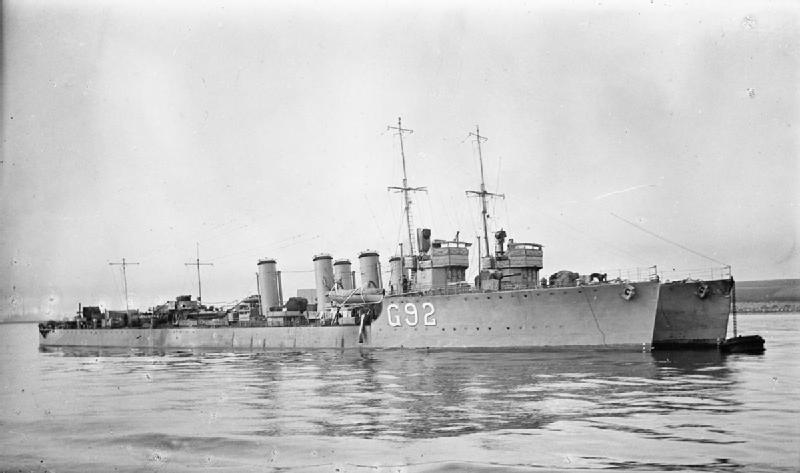
- Two R-class destroyers, sister ship HMS Rob Roy nearest

History

United Kingdom
- Name: HMS Sable
- Namesake: Sable
- Ordered: July 1915
- Builder: J. Samuel White, East Cowes
- Yard number: 1477
- Launched: 28 June 1916
- Completed: 30 November 1916
- Out of service: August 1927
- Fate: Broken up

General characteristics
- Class & type: R-class destroyer
- Displacement: 975 long tons (991 t) (normal); 1,173 long tons (1,192 t) (deep load)
- Length: 276 ft (84.1 m) (o.a.)
- Beam: 26 ft 8 in (8.13 m)
- Draught: 9 ft (2.7 m)
- Installed power: 3 Yarrow boilers; 27,000 shp (20,000 kW)
- Propulsion: 2 geared Parsons steam turbines
- Speed: 36 knots (66.7 km/h; 41.4 mph)
- Range: 3,450 nmi (6,390 km; 3,970 mi) at 15 knots (28 km/h; 17 mph)
- Complement: 82
- Armament: 3 × single QF 4-inch (102 mm) Mark IV guns; 1 × single 2-pdr 40 mm (2 in) AA gun; 2 × twin 21 in (533 mm) torpedo tubes

HMS Sable was a R-class destroyer that served with the Royal Navy during the First World War. The R class were an improvement on the previous M class with geared steam turbines to improve efficiency. Laid down by J. Samuel White at East Cowes on the Isle of Wight, the destroyer was launched in November 1916 and joined the Grand Fleet. Service during the war was mostly uneventful, apart from a collision with fellow R class destroyer Salmon. After the War, the destroyer was placed in reserve and decommissioned, being sold to be broken up in August 1927. In a twist of fate,Salmon was renamed Sable in 1933.

== Design and development ==
Sable was one of seventeen R-class destroyer delivered to the British Admiralty as part of the Sixth War Construction Programme. The design was generally similar to the preceding M class, but differed in having geared turbines, the central gun mounted on a bandstand and minor changes to improve seakeeping.

The destroyer had an overall length of 276 feet (84.12 m), with a beam of 26 feet 8 inches (8.13 m) and a draught of 9 feet (2.74 m). Displacement was 975 long tons (991 t) normal and 1,173 long tons (1,192 t) deep load. Power was provided by three Yarrow boilers feeding two Parsons geared steam turbines rated at 27,000 shaft horsepower (20,000 kW) and driving two shafts, to give a design speed of 36 knots (67 km/h; 41 mph). During trials, the vessel achieved a speed of 35.2 knots (65.2 km/h; 40.5 mph). Three funnels were fitted. A fuel load of 296 long tons (301 t) of oil was carried, giving a design range of 3,450 nautical miles (6,390 km; 3,970 mi) at 15 knots (28 km/h; 17 mph).

Armament consisted of three single 4-inch (100 mm) Mk IV guns on the ship's centreline, with one on the forecastle, one aft on a raised platform and one between the second and third funnels. A single 2-pounder 40 mm (2 in)"pom-pom" anti-aircraft gun was carried on a platform between two twin mounts for 21 in (533 mm) torpedoes. The ship had a complement of 82 officers and ratings.

== Construction and career ==
Ordered in July 1915, Sable was laid down by J. Samuel White at East Cowes on the Isle of Wight with the yard number 1477, and launched on 28 June the following year. The vessel was the first of the name, recalling the species of Marten. The destroyer was completed on 30 November 1916 and was deployed as part of the Grand Fleet, joining the Fifteenth Destroyer Flotilla, remaining until the end of the war.

The destroyer was soon on active service and, on 29 January 1917, joined a flotilla led by leader Grenville that sought to engage German destroyers in a sweep of the English Channel. On 12 February, four German large torpedo boats attacked the regular convoy between Britain and Norway, overwhelming the escort of two destroyers (Partridge and Pellew) and four naval trawlers. All the escort except Pellew were sunk, as were all six merchant ships. Sable picked up survivors from one of the trawlers, Commander Fullerton, later that day. On 14 April, the destroyer formed part of the escort for RMS Olympic, which transported Arthur Balfour on a mission to the US to procure additional destroyers for the fleet. The mission encountered heavy seas that caused substantial damage, but was a success. The ship later undertook anti-submarine patrols. Also during the year, the ship collided with sister ship Salmon, sustaining damage to the bridge. Both ships made it successfully back to port.

After the Armistice, Sable helped to escort the surrendered German fleet to its internment and subsequent scuttling at Scapa Flow. The vessel was then allocated to the torpedo school at Portsmouth attached to Vernon. During 1919, the ship was moved to Plymouth and reduced to reserve. On 28 July 1921, the destroyer was moved to Portland. However, in 1923, the Navy decided to scrap many of the older destroyers in preparation for the introduction of newer and larger vessels. Sable was one of the destroyers chosen for retirement. During August 1927, Sable was sold to Hughes Bolckow of Blyth, Northumberland and subsequently broken up. The name was subsequently taken in 1933 by the very Salmon that had collided with the destroyer earlier in her career.

== Pennant numbers ==
Pennant number	Date
G91	January 1918
G44	January 1919
H93	January 1922
