= HMS Portia (1916) =

British M-Class destroyer, WW1

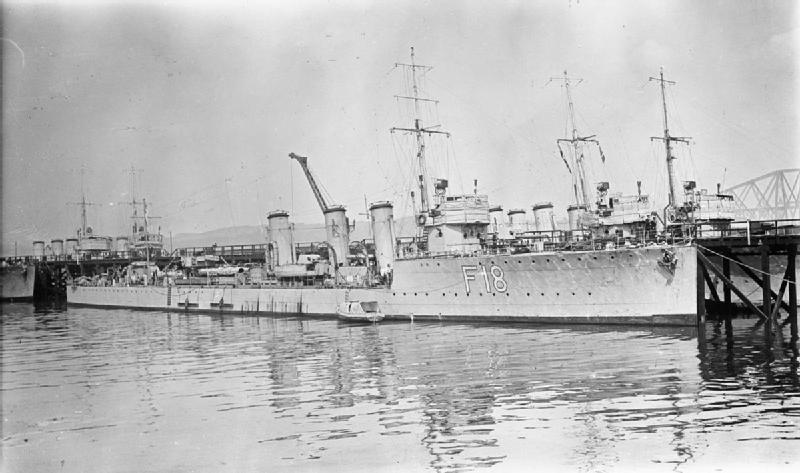
- Sister ship Paladin in 1916

History

United Kingdom
- Name: HMS Portia
- Namesake: Portia
- Ordered: February 1915
- Builder: Scotts, Greenock
- Yard number: 475
- Laid down: May 1915
- Launched: 10 August 1916
- Completed: 24 October 1916
- Fate: Sold to be broken up on 9 May 1921

General characteristics
- Class & type: Admiralty M-class destroyer
- Displacement: 994 long tons (1,010 t) normal; 1,025 long tons (1,041 t) full load
- Length: 265 ft (80.8 m)
- Beam: 26 ft 8 in (8.1 m)
- Draught: 9 ft 3 in (2.82 m)
- Propulsion: 3 Yarrow boilers; 2 Brown-Curtis steam turbines, 25,000 shp (19,000 kW)
- Speed: 34 kn (39 mph; 63 km/h)
- Range: 3,450 nmi (6,390 km) at 15 kn (28 km/h)
- Complement: 76
- Armament: 3 × QF 4-inch (102 mm) Mark IV guns (3×1); 1 × single 2-pounder (40-mm) "pom-pom" Mk. II anti-aircraft gun (1×1); 4 × 21 in (533 mm) torpedo tubes (2×2)

HMS Portia was a Admiralty M-class destroyer which served with the Royal Navy during the First World War. The M class were an improvement on the previous L-class destroyer, capable of higher speed. Launched on 10 August 1916. Portia initially served with the Grand Fleet but was allocated to convoy escort duties in early 1917. The vessel was particularly active in anti-submarine warfare, although Portia never successful sank a submarine. After the Armistice of 11 November 1918, the ship was placed in reserve before being decommissioned and sold to be broken up on 9 May 1921.

== Design and development ==
Portia was one of eighteen Admiralty M-class destroyers ordered by the British Admiralty in February 1915 as part of the Fifth War Construction Programme. The M-class was an improved version of the earlier L-class destroyers, designed to reach a higher speed in order to counter rumoured German fast destroyers.

The destroyer was 265 feet (80.8 m) long overall, with a beam of 26 ft 8 in (8.1 m) and a draught of 9 ft 3 in (2.8 m). displacement was 994 long tons (1,010 t) normal and 1,025 long tons (1,041 t) full load. Power was provided by three Yarrow boilers feeding two Brown-Curtis steam turbines rated at 25,000 shaft horsepower (19,000 kW) and driving two shafts, to give a design speed of 34 kn (63 km/h; 39 mph). Three funnels were fitted. 296 long tons (301 t) of oil were carried, giving a design range of 3,450 nautical miles (6,390 km; 3,970 mi) at 15 kn (28 km/h; 17 mph).

Armament consisted of three 4 in (102 mm) Mk IV QF guns on the ship's centreline, with one on the forecastle, one aft on a raised platform and one between the middle and aft funnels. A single 2-pounder (40 mm) pom-pom anti-aircraft gun was carried, while torpedo armament consisted of two twin mounts for 21 in (533 mm) torpedoes. Portia had a complement of 76 officers and ratings.

== Construction and career ==
Portia was laid down by Scotts Shipbuilding and Engineering Company of Greenock with the yard number 475 in May 1915, launched on 10 August the following year and completed on 24 October. The ship was named after Portia from William Shakespeare's The Merchant of Venice. It was the second time that the name had been used, the preceding vessel having been launched more than a century before in 1810. The vessel was initially deployed as part of the Grand Fleet, joining the Fifteenth Destroyer Flotilla.

Portia was transferred from the Grand Fleet on 23 January 1917 and allocated to anti-submarine operations after the German navy declared unrestricted submarine warfare in February 1917. On 14 February, the destroyer joined sister ships Partridge, Plover and Rob Roy in hunting the submarine SM UC-44. The search did not find anything. Also common were escort duties to protect convoys of merchant ships. Sometimes the operations did not deter the attackers, as on 17 May when the submarine SM U-19 attacked a seven-ship convoy which the destroyer was escorting and sank one, a Swedish vessel. Others were more successful, such as Convoy HH13 of thirteen ships which came through without loss.

After the Armistice of 11 November 1918 the Royal Navy returned to a peacetime level of mobilisation, and surplus vessels were placed in reserve. Portia was initially transferred to Devenport on 12 December 1919 until being decommissioned and sold to Thos. W. Ward in Milford Haven on 9 May 1921. The ship was subsequently broken up.

== Pennant numbers ==
Pennant number	Date
G40	1916
F18	1917
F14	1918
G73	1918
D1A	1918
