= Robert Roy =

Robert Roy may refer to:

- Robert H. Roy, American mechanical engineer and dean
- Robert Roy (cricketer), New Zealand cricketer

== See also ==
- Rob Roy (disambiguation)
