= HMS Ready (1916) =

British naval vessel

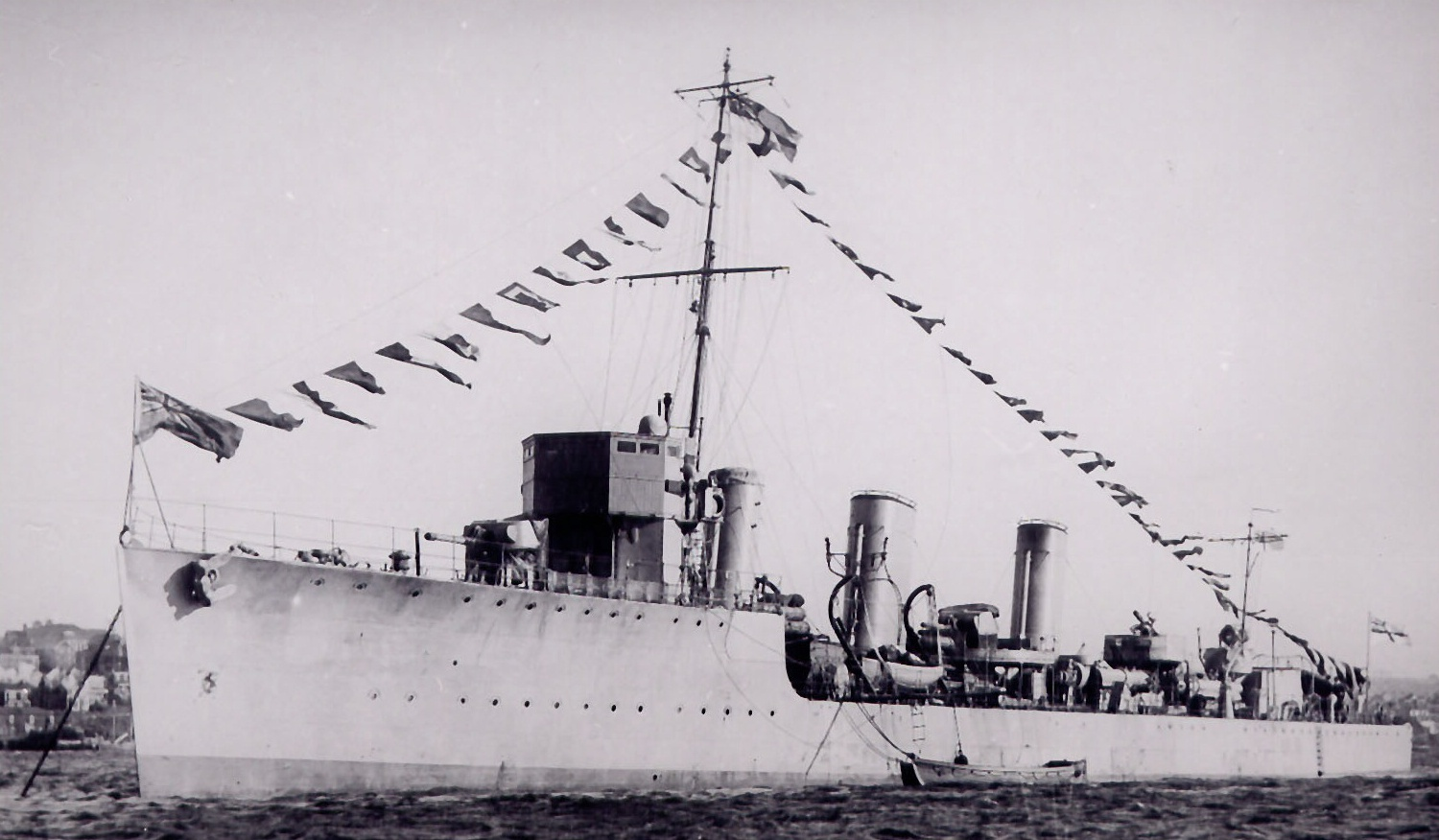
- Sister ship HMS Patriot

History

United Kingdom
- Name: Ready
- Builder: Thornycroft, Woolston, Southampton
- Yard number: 828
- Laid down: 2 September 1915
- Launched: 26 August 1916
- Commissioned: 31 October 1916
- Decommissioned: 13 July 1926
- Fate: Broken up at Garston, Liverpool

General characteristics
- Class & type: Thornycroft M-class destroyer
- Displacement: 1,033 long tons (1,050 t) standard; 1,208 long tons (1,227 t) full
- Length: 274 ft (83.5 m)
- Beam: 27 ft 6 in (8.4 m)
- Draught: 10 ft (120.0 in)
- Propulsion: 3 × Yarrow boilers; 2 × Brown-Curtis steam turbines, 27,500 shp (20,500 kW)
- Speed: 35 kn (40 mph; 65 km/h)
- Range: 3,450 nmi (6,390 km) at 20 kn (37 km/h)
- Complement: 82
- Armament: 3 × single QF 4 in (102 mm) guns; 1 × single 2-pdr (40 mm (1.6 in)) AA gun; 2 × twin 21 in (533 mm) torpedo tubes

HMS Ready was a destroyer of the M class that served with the Royal Navy during First World War. Launched by Thornycroft in 1916, the vessel was the one of two similar ships ordered as part of the Fifth War Construction Programme. They differed from the remainder of the M class in having more powerful engines. The design was used as the basis for the subsequent five ships of the R-class also built by the yard. Ready operated within the Grand Fleet until it was disbanded at the end of the war. The vessel was credited with helping to sink a German Q-ship in 1917. After the war, the destroyer was initially transferred to HMNB Portsmouth, but was retired and sold to be broken up in 1926 after almost a decade of service as part of a preparation for a fleet of new destroyers.

== Design and development ==
Ready was one of two M-class destroyers ordered by the British Admiralty from John I. Thornycroft & Company in May 1915 as part of the Fifth War Construction Programme. Ready and Rapid differed from the Admiralty design in having more powerful engines, which gave them a higher potential speed. The speed increase was to combat a rumoured German design that was capable of 36 knots (67 km/h; 41 mph). Thornycroft had previously delivered four other M-class destroyers to the Admiralty to slightly different specifications, and together they are considered to be a single class.

Ready was 274 feet (83.5 m) long overall and 265 ft (80.8 m) long between perpendiculars, with a beam of 27 ft 6 in (8.4 m) and a draught of 10 ft (3.0 m). Displacement was 1,033 long tons (1,050 t) normal and 1,208 long tons (1,227 t) full load. Three Yarrow boilers fed steam to Brown-Curtis steam turbines rated at 26,500 shp (19,800 kW) which drove three shafts, giving a design speed of 35 knots (65 km/h; 40 mph), although the ship reached 35.45 knots (65.65 km/h; 40.80 mph) during trials. Three funnels were fitted, the centre one being wider than the others, a feature shared with the R-class destroyers designed by Thornycroft. A total of 275 long tons (279 t) of fuel oil was carried, giving a design range of 1,620 nautical miles (3,000 km; 1,860 mi) at 20 knots (37 km/h; 23 mph).

Armament consisted of three single QF 4-inch (102 mm) Mk IV guns on the ship's centreline, with one on the forecastle, one aft and one between the second and third funnels. Four 21 in (533 mm) torpedoes were carried in two twin rotating mounts. By 1920, the ship was equipped with a single QF 2-pounder 40 mm (2 in) "pom-pom" anti-aircraft gun. The vessel had a complement of 82 officers and ratings.

== Construction and service ==
Ready was laid down on 2 September 1915 and launched on 26 August 1916. Once completed in October 1916, the ship joined the Grand Fleet, allocated to the Fifteenth Destroyer Flotilla. The flotilla was involved in anti-submarine patrols during June 1917 which, although involving twelves attacks, did not lead to the destruction of any submarines. From 31 October to 2 November 1917, the 15th Flotilla made a sortie into the Kattegat, sinking the German Q-ship K (also known as Kronprinz Wilhelm) on 2 November and nine trawlers. Ready, together with the destroyer leader Parker, and the destroyers Rigorous, Rocket, Rob Roy, Sharpshooter and Trenchant, was awarded a bounty for sinking Konprinz Wilhelm.

Ready continued to serve with the Fifteenth Destroyer Flotilla until the end of the war. When the Grand Fleet was disbanded, Ready was allocated to the defence flotilla at HMNB Portsmouth. However, in 1923, the Navy decided to scrap many of the older destroyers in preparation for the introduction of newer and larger vessels. The destroyer was sold to King to be broken up at Garston, Liverpool on 13 July 1926.

== Pennant numbers ==
Pennant number	Date
G71	September 1915
G87	January 1917
G84	January 1918
D97	November 1919
H74	January 1922
