= HMS Rigorous =

Destroyer of the Royal Navy

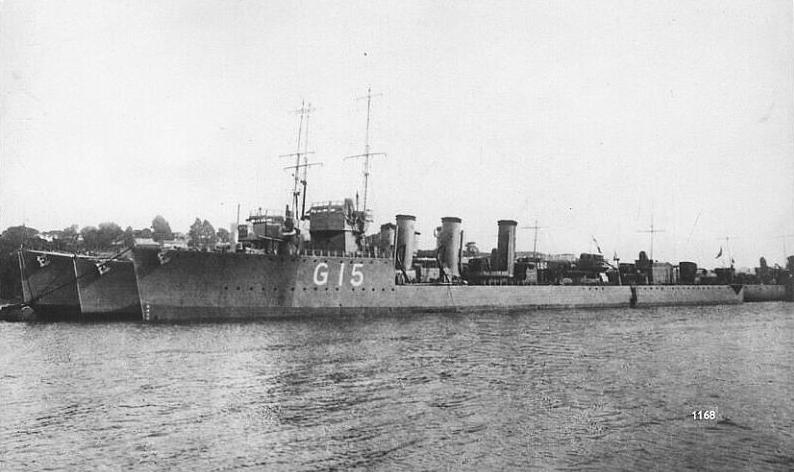
- Sistership HMS Romola

History

United Kingdom
- Name: HMS Rigorous
- Builder: John Brown & Company, Clydebank
- Yard number: 452
- Laid down: 22 September 1915
- Launched: 30 September 1916
- Commissioned: 30 November 1916
- Decommissioned: 5 November 1926
- Fate: Broken up

General characteristics
- Class & type: R-class destroyer
- Displacement: 975 long tons (991 t) normal; 1,173 long tons (1,192 t) deep load
- Length: 265 ft (80.8 m) p.p.
- Beam: 26 ft 9 in (8.15 m)
- Draught: 9 ft 10 in (3.00 m)
- Propulsion: 3 Yarrow boilers; 2 geared Brown-Curtis steam turbines, 27,000 shp (20,000 kW)
- Speed: 36 knots (41.4 mph; 66.7 km/h)
- Range: 3,440 nmi (6,370 km) at 15 kn (28 km/h)
- Complement: 82
- Armament: 3 × QF 4-inch (101.6 mm) Mark IV guns, mounting P Mk. IX; 1 × single 2-pounder (40-mm) "pom-pom" Mk. II anti-aircraft gun; 4 × 21 in (533 mm) torpedo tubes (2×2)

HMS Rigorous was an R-class destroyer which served with the Royal Navy during World War I. Launched on 30 September 1916, the vessel operated as part of the Grand Fleet, operating as part of destroyer flotillas hunting German ships that were attacking convoys. One flotilla was successful in destroying a Q ship in 1917. After the War, the destroyer was given a reduced complement and was sold to be broken up on 5 November 1926.

== Design and development ==
Rigorous was one of seventeen R-class destroyers ordered by the British Admiralty in July 1915 as part of the Sixth War Construction Programme. The R class were a development of the preceding M-class, but differed in having geared turbines, the central gun mounted on a bandstand and minor changes to improve seakeeping.

The destroyer was 265 feet (80.77 m) long between perpendiculars, with a beam of 26 feet 9 inches (8.15 m) and a draught of 9 feet 10 inches (3.00 m). Displacement was 975 long tons (991 t) normal and 1,173 long tons (1,192 t) deep load. Power was provided by three Yarrow boilers feeding two Brown-Curtis geared steam turbines rated at 27,000 shaft horsepower (20,000 kW) and driving two shafts, to give a design speed of 36 knots (67 km/h; 41 mph). Three funnels were fitted. 296 long tons (301 t) of oil were carried, giving a design range of 3,450 nautical miles (6,390 km; 3,970 mi) at 15 knots (28 km/h; 17 mph).

Armament consisted of three 4 in (100 mm) Mk IV QF guns on the ship's centreline, with one on the forecastle, one aft on a raised platform and one between the second and third funnels. A single 2-pounder (40 mm) pom-pom anti-aircraft gun was carried, while torpedo armament consisted of two twin mounts for 21 in (533 mm) torpedoes. The ship had a complement of 82 officers and ratings.

== Construction and career ==
Rigorous was laid down by John Brown & Company at Clydebank on the River Clyde on 22 September 1915 and launched on 30 September 1916, leaving the yard on 30 November that year. The destroyer was allocated the yard number 452.

On commissioning, Rigorous joined the 15th Destroyer Flotilla of the Grand Fleet. In October 1917, Rigorous formed part of a large-scale operation, involving 30 cruisers and 54 destroyers deployed in eight groups across the North Sea in an attempt to stop a suspected sortie by German naval forces. Rigorous, along with Rocket, Rowena, Sabrina and Trenchant, operated with the 2nd Light Cruiser Squadron. Despite these measures, the German light cruisers Bremse and Brummer managed to attack the regular convoy between Norway and Britain on 17 October, sinking nine merchant ships and two destroyers, Mary Rose and Strongbow before returning safely to Germany. The vessel was credited with bounty for sinking the German Q-ship K (also known as Kronprinz Willhelm) on 2 November 1917 along with Parker, Ready, Rocket, Rob Roy, Sorceress and Trenchant.

After the Armistice, the ship initially remained with the Grand Fleet but was recommissioned with reduced complement on 30 October 1919. In 1923, the Navy decided to scrap many of the older destroyers in preparation for the introduction of newer and larger vessels. Rigorous was subsequently decommissioned and broken up by Cashmore at Newport on 5 November 1926.

== Pennant numbers ==
Pennant number	Date
G90	1917
G86	1918
