= Rob Roy =

Rob Roy usually refers to the Scottish folk hero Rob Roy MacGregor (Scottish Gaelic: Raibeart Ruadh MacGriogair, 1671–1734).

Rob Roy may also refer to:

== Places ==
- Rob Roy, Victoria, a district of the town of Christmas Hills, Victoria, Australia
- Mount Rob Roy, a mountain, adjacent to the Canberra suburb of Banks, Australian Capital Territory
- Rob Roy, Ontario, a hamlet in Grey County, Ontario, Canada
- Rob Roy Glacier, a glacier on New Zealand's South Island
- Rob Roy Peak, a mountain on New Zealand's South Island
- Rob Roy Way, a long-distance footpath in Scotland
- Rob Roy Island, an island in the Solomon Islands
- Rob Roy, Indiana, United States, a small town

== Works related to Rob Roy MacGregor ==
- Rob Roy (novel), an 1817 novel by Walter Scott based on MacGregor's life
  - Rob Roy (play), an 1818 play based on the novel
  - Rob Roy Overture, a musical composition by Hector Berlioz inspired by the novel, composed in 1831 and first performed at the Paris Conservatoire on 14 April 1833
- Rob Roy (operetta), an 1894 operetta by Reginald De Koven and Harry B. Smith
- Rob Roy (1922 film), a silent film starring David Hawthorne
- Rob Roy: The Highland Rogue, a 1953 film starring Richard Todd and Glynis Johns
- Rob Roy (1987 film), an animated film produced by Burbank Films Australia
- Rob Roy (1995 film), starring Liam Neeson and Jessica Lange

== Ships ==
- CSS Rob Roy, a Confederate blockade runner
- HMS Rob Roy (1916), a British Royal Navy destroyer which served in the First World War
- PS Rob Roy, the first seaworthy steamship
- Rob Roy 23, an American sailboat design

== Sports ==
- Kirkintilloch Rob Roy F.C., a football club from Kirkintilloch, Scotland
- Rob Roy F.C., a defunct football club from Callander, Scotland
- Rob Roy Boat Club, a rowing club on the River Cam, Cambridge, United Kingdom

== Other uses ==
- Rob Roy, nickname of John MacGregor (1825–1892), English explorer, travel writer and philanthropist, and also the boats that he designed
- Rob Roy, CEO and co-founder of Switch
- Rob Roy (cocktail), created in conjunction with the premiere of De Koven' and Smith's Rob Roy operetta (1894)
- Rob Roy (dog), a collie owned by Calvin Coolidge
- Rob Roy (bar), a bar in Seattle, Washington, U.S.
- Norman Fox & The Rob-Roys, a doo-wop group
- Zenno Rob Roy, a Japanese Thoroughbred racehorse.

== See also ==
- Robert H. Roy (1906–2000), American mechanical engineer and the former Dean of Engineering Science at Johns Hopkins University
- Robert Roy (cricketer) (born 1948), New Zealand cricketer
