= HMS Rapid (1916) =

Destroyer of the Royal Navy

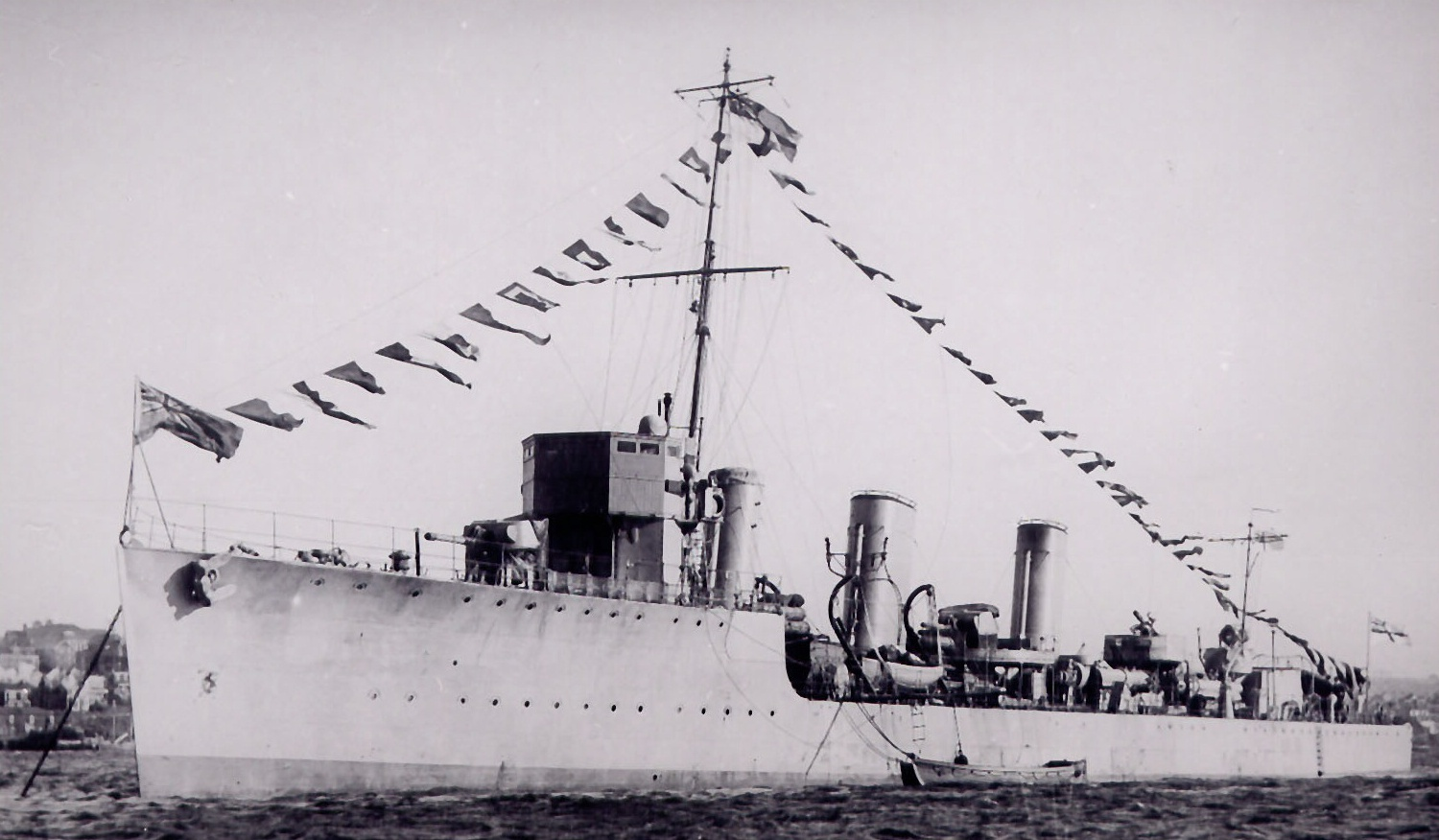
- HMS Patriot was an earlier Thornycroft M-class, seen here in 1922

History

United Kingdom
- Name: Rapid
- Builder: Thornycroft, Woolston, Southampton
- Yard number: 827
- Laid down: 12 August 1915
- Launched: 15 July 1916
- Completed: 19 September 1916
- Decommissioned: 20 April 1927
- Fate: Broken up at Garston, Liverpool

General characteristics
- Class & type: Thornycroft M-class destroyer
- Displacement: 1,033 long tons (1,050 t) (normal); 1,208 long tons (1,227 t) (full load)
- Length: 274 ft (83.5 m) (o.a.); 265 ft (80.8 m) (p.p.)
- Beam: 27 ft 6 in (8.4 m)
- Draught: 10 ft (3.0 m)
- Installed power: 3 Yarrow boilers, 26,500 shp (19,800 kW)
- Propulsion: Brown-Curtis steam turbines, 3 shafts
- Speed: 35 kn (40 mph; 65 km/h)
- Range: 3,450 nmi (6,390 km) at 20 kn (37 km/h)
- Complement: 82
- Electronic warfare & decoys: 3 × single QF 4-inch (102 mm) Mark IV guns; 1 × single 2-pdr 40 mm (2 in) AA gun; 2 × twin 21 in (533 mm) torpedo tubes

HMS Rapid was a destroyer of the M class that served with the Royal Navy during First World War. Launched by Thornycroft in 1916, the vessel was the one of two similar ships ordered as part of the Fifth War Construction Programme. They differed from the remainder of the M class in having more powerful engines. The design was used as the basis for the subsequent five ships of the R-class also built by the yard. Rapid served in escort and patrol roles, principally providing defence from submarines as part of the Grand Fleet until it was disbanded at the end of the War. After the end of hostilities, the vessel served in minor roles, including briefly as part of the Admiralty Compass Department in 1921 and 1924, but was sold to be scrapped in 1927.

== Design ==
Rapid was one of two M-class destroyers ordered by the British Admiralty from John I. Thornycroft & Company in May 1915 as part of the Fifth War Construction Programme. Rapid and Ready differed from the Admiralty design in having more powerful engines, which gave them a higher potential speed. The speed increase was to combat a rumoured German design that was capable of 36 knots (67 km/h; 41 mph). Thornycroft had previously delivered four other M-class destroyers to the Admiralty to slightly different specifications, and together they are considered to be a single class.

Rapid was 274 feet (83.5 m) long overall and 265 ft (80.8 m) long between perpendiculars, with a beam of 27 ft 6 in (8.4 m) and a draught of 10 ft (3.0 m). Displacement was 1,033 long tons (1,050 t) normal and 1,208 long tons (1,227 t) full load. Three Yarrow boilers fed steam to Brown-Curtis steam turbines rated at 26,500 shp (19,800 kW) which drove three shafts, giving a design speed of 35 knots (65 km/h; 40 mph), although the ship reached 35.45 knots (65.65 km/h; 40.80 mph) during trials. Three funnels were fitted, the centre one being wider than the others, a feature shared with the R-class destroyers designed by Thornycroft. A total of 275 long tons (279 t) of fuel oil was carried, giving a design range of 1,620 nautical miles (3,000 km; 1,860 mi) at 20 knots (37 km/h; 23 mph).

Armament consisted of three single QF 4-inch (102 mm) Mk IV guns on the ship's centreline, with one on the forecastle, one aft and one between the second and third funnels. Four 21 in (533 mm) torpedoes were carried in two twin rotating mounts. By 1920, the ship was equipped with a single QF 2-pounder 40 mm (2 in) "pom-pom" anti-aircraft gun. The vessel had a complement of 82 officers and ratings.

== Service ==
Rapid was laid down on 12 August 1915 and launched on 15 July 1916. Once completed on 19 September 1916, the ship joined the Grand Fleet, initially with the Fifteenth Destroyer Flotilla. Occasionally, the vessel operated alone. On 17 May 1917, the ship rescued the survivors from the British armed merchantman Middlesex, which had been sunk by the German submarine U-30 the previous day. In the process, Rapid was involved in a friendly fire incident when it mistook the British submarine E54, which was simultaneously approaching the lifeboats, for an enemy and subjected it to gunfire and a depth charge attack, albeit without sinking it.

The flotilla was also employed collectively in larger operations, although these sorties were also not always as successful. For example, during an anti-submarine patrol in the North Sea as part of a convoy run from Lerwick between 15 and 24 June 1917, Rapid launched twelve attacks, none of which led to the destruction of any submarines. The destroyer was also employed on escort duties and it was during one these operations in the North Sea during August 1917 that Rapid, along with the destroyer Tirade, unsuccessfully attacked a fleeing German submarine. Rapid continued to serve with the Fifteenth Destroyer Flotilla until the end of the war.

When the Grand Fleet was disbanded, Rapid was kept on "miscellaneous service." (Note: Contemporary documents also list a HMS Rapid in Gibraltar but this was an older vessel.) In 1921, the ship was seconded to the Compass Department of the Admiralty, which had responsibility for many of the scientific instruments used on board ships of the Navy. The ship was then transferred to the Reserve Fleet at Portsmouth. During September 1924, the vessel was again seconded for compass trials, before again returning to reserve. In the interim, however, the Navy decided to scrap many of the older destroyers, up to and including some of the M-class, in preparation for the introduction of newer and larger vessels. Despite having little over a decade in service, Rapid was retired and sold to G Cohen for breaking up on 20 April 1927.

== Pennant numbers ==
Pennant number	Date
G63	September 1915
G78	January 1917
G83	January 1918
G46	November 1919
H94	January 1922
