= HMS Grenville (1916) =

Destroyer of the Royal Navy

History

United Kingdom
- Name: Grenville
- Ordered: February 1915
- Builder: Cammell Laird, Birkenhead
- Laid down: 19 June 1915
- Launched: 17 June 1916
- Commissioned: 11 October 1916
- Fate: Sold for scrap 17 December 1931

General characteristics
- Class & type: Parker-class leader
- Displacement: 1,660–1,673 long tons (1,687–1,700 t)
- Length: 325 ft (99.1 m) oa; 315 ft (96.0 m) pp
- Beam: 31 ft 9 in (9.7 m)
- Draught: 12 ft (3.7 m) maximum
- Propulsion: 4 × Yarrow boilers, Parsons turbines, 3 shafts; 36,000 shaft horsepower (27,000 kW)
- Speed: 34 kn (63 km/h; 39 mph)
- Range: 4,920 nautical miles (9,110 km; 5,660 mi) at 15 knots (28 km/h; 17 mph)
- Complement: 116
- Armament: 4 × single QF 4-inch Mark IV guns; 2 × 2-pounder "pom-pom" guns; 2 × twin 21 inch (533 mm) torpedo tube sets; 2 × depth charge chutes

HMS Grenville was a Parker-class flotilla leader of the British Royal Navy. She was built by Cammell Laird during the First World War, being launched on 17 June 1916 and completing on 11 October that year. Grenville served with the Grand Fleet for the rest of the war, which she survived. The ship took part in operations in the Baltic during the Russian Civil War in the winter of 1919–1920, before entering a long period of reserve. She was sold for scrap in December 1931.

== Construction and design ==
In February 1915, the British Admiralty ordered three Parker-class flotilla leaders (i.e. large destroyers intended to lead flotillas of smaller destroyers in action) under the Fourth Emergency War Construction Programme, Grenville and Parker, from the Birkenhead shipyard Cammell Laird. The Parker class (Note: Also known as the improved Marksman class) was an improved version of the earlier Marksman-class flotilla leader with the forward two funnels of the Marksman class merged into one and the ships' bridge moved rearwards, allowing an improved gun layout.

The Parkers were 325 feet (99.1 m) long overall and 315 feet (96.0 m) between perpendiculars, with a beam of 31 feet 9 inches (9.7 m) and a draught of 12 feet (3.7 m). Displacement was between 1,660 long tons (1,687 t) and 1,673 long tons (1,700 t) normal (Note: Jane's Fighting Ships of World War I gives a normal displacement of 1,666 long tons (1,693 t) in 1919.) and about 1,900 long tons (1,930 t) full load. Four Yarrow boilers fed steam to three sets of Parsons steam turbines, rated at 36,000 shaft horsepower (27,000 kW) (Note: The machinery gave 37,865 shp (28,236 kW) during sea trials.) and giving a speed of 34 knots (63 km/h; 39 mph). Three funnels were fitted. 515 long tons (523 t) of oil fuel were carried, giving a range of 4,290 nautical miles (7,950 km; 4,940 mi) at 15 knots (28 km/h; 17 mph).

The ship's main gun armament consisted of four QF 4-inch (102 mm) Mk IV guns mounted on the ships centreline, with the forward two guns superfiring so that one could fire over the other, with one gun between the second and third funnel and one aft. Two 2-pounder (40 mm) "pom-pom" anti-aircraft guns were fitted, while torpedo armament consisted of two sets of twin 21-inch (533 mm) torpedo tubes. The standard anti-submarine armament for flotilla leaders such as Grenville from June 1916 onwards was two Type D depth charges on chutes, although the number of depth charges tended to increased as the war progressed and the importance of anti-submarine operations grew. The ship's complement was 116 officers and men.

Grenville, named for the Elizabethan sailor Richard Grenville, was laid down on 19 June 1915 and launched on 17 June 1916. She was commissioned on 10 October 1916.

== Service ==
After commissioning, Grenville joined the recently established 15th Destroyer Flotilla of the Grand Fleet at Scapa Flow as co-leader with sister ship Parker. In December 1916, Grenville was ordered to lead eight destroyers to temporarily reinforce the Harwich Force, to compensate for destroyers detached from Harwich to the Dover Patrol to guard against operations by German torpedo boats in the English Channel, leaving Scapa on 18 December and reaching Harwich on 20 December.

On 22 January 1917, the German Sixth Torpedo Boat Flotilla, consisting of 11 torpedo boats (equivalent in size and armament to British destroyers) set out from Helgoland to Flanders to reinforce the German torpedo boat forces based in the Belgian ports. Decoding of German radio signals by Room 40 warned the British of the German intentions and the Harwich Force was deployed to intercept the German ships on the night of 22/23 January. Grenville led a group of six destroyers patrolling off the entrance to the River Maas, (Note: Grenville, Radstock, Sorceress, Rigorous, Rob Roy, Meteor and Melpomene), with two more groups of destroyers off the Schouwen Bank while two groups of cruisers waited between the Hinder and the Maas. The German force ran into one of the cruiser divisions, with the destroyers V69 and G41 heavily damaged, but the Germans managed to break contact. Several of the British destroyers left their patrol positions on hearing the noise of the engagement with the hope of joining in, and while Grenville initially remained on station, the German ships managed to slip through. One German straggler, SMS S50 encountered a British destroyer patrol and sank the destroyer Simoom before escaping. On the morning of 23 January, while the ships were preparing to return to port, a German submarine fired a torpedo at Grenville. The torpedo missed, and also passed under Meteor without hitting.

On 29 January 1917, as a response to intelligence of a sortie of units of the German High Seas Fleet, (in fact the German light cruiser Graudenz with torpedo boats of II and IX Torpedo-Boat Flotilla sortied to the Hoofden), Grenville was ordered to lead 12 destroyers and patrol between Lowestoft and Harwich to guard against German raids. The British destroyers saw nothing, although several British submarines on patrol in the North Sea sighted German torpedo boats, and E29 unsuccessfully attacked four torpedo boats. In July 1917, the 15th Flotilla moved from Scapa to Rosyth. On 25 July, Grenville was one of five destroyers escorting a convoy of five empty oilers returning to the United States when the German submarine UC-41 torpedoed and sunk the oiler Oakleaf.

Grenville remained part of the 15th Flotilla at the end of the war, and on 21 November 1918, helped to escort the German High Seas Fleet to the Firth of Forth prior to its internment at Scapa Flow. In early 1919, the Grand Fleet was disbanded, with the Atlantic Fleet taking its place, with Grenville joining the newly reformed 4th Destroyer Flotilla, operating in Irish waters from April to June that year. After repairs at Rosyth and Devonport in November–December 1919, Grenville deployed with the 4th Flotilla to the Baltic as part of the British intervention in the Russian Civil War, from December 1919 to February 1920.

Grenville was placed into reserve on 3 March 1920, where she remained until recommissioning on 27 February 1924 to take part in manoeuvres, returning to reserve at Chatham in August that year. The ship underwent repair at Devonport in 1925, and in 1926 twice briefly recommissioned for trials before returning to reserve. She was sold for £3,905 to Edgar G Rees on 17 December 1931 and scrapped at Llanelli, Wales from 21 February 1932.

== Pennant numbers ==
Pennant number	From	To
G61	1916	March 1917
G85	March 1917	January 1918
G75	January 1918	April 1918
G95	April 1918	October 1919
F54	January 1921	1922
