= HMS Patrician =

Thornycroft M-class destroyer

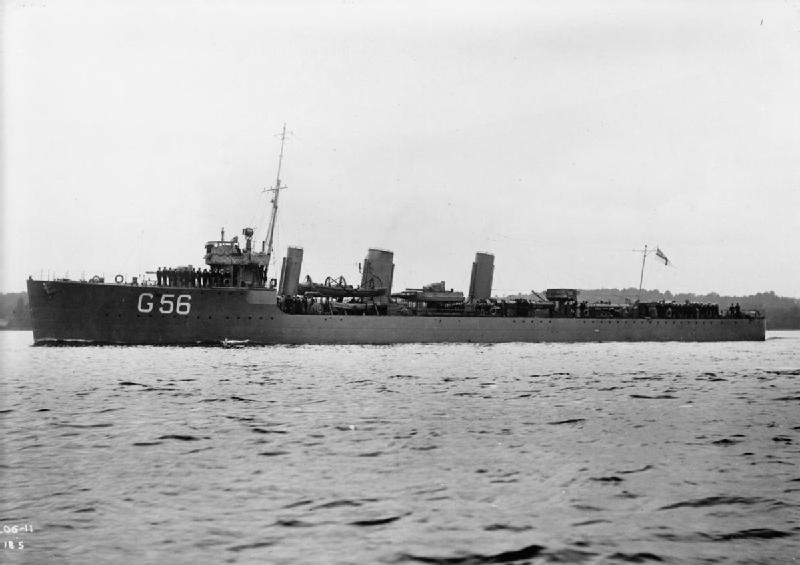
- HMS Patrician circa 1916–1918

History

United Kingdom
- Name: Patrician
- Builder: Thornycroft & Company, Southampton
- Laid down: June 1915
- Launched: 5 June 1916
- Out of service: September 1920
- Fate: Transferred to Canada in 1920

Canada
- Name: Patrician
- Acquired: September 1920
- Commissioned: 1 November 1920
- Decommissioned: 1 January 1928
- Fate: Sold 1929, broken up at Esquimalt

General characteristics
- Class & type: Thornycroft M-class destroyer
- Displacement: 985 long tons (1,001 t)
- Length: 274 ft (84 m) o/a
- Beam: 27 ft 3 in (8.31 m)
- Draught: 10 ft 6 in (3.20 m)
- Propulsion: Brown-Curtis steam turbines; 26,500 shp (19,800 kW); 3 shafts
- Speed: 35 knots (65 km/h; 40 mph)
- Range: 254 long tons (258 t) oil
- Complement: 80
- Armament: 3 × QF 4 in (102 mm) Mark IV guns, mounting P Mk.IX; 1 × single QF 2-pounder "pom-pom" Mk.II; 2 × twin 21 inch (533 mm) torpedo tubes

HMS Patrician was a Thornycroft M-class destroyer that served in the British Royal Navy during World War I. The destroyer entered service in 1916 and served with the Grand Fleet. Following the war, the destroyer was deemed surplus and she was transferred to the Royal Canadian Navy in 1920 and served there until 1928. She was sold for scrap in 1929.

== Design and description ==
Patrician was a Thornycroft M-class destroyer that displaced 985 long tons (1,001 t) and was 274 feet (84 m) long overall with a beam of 27 feet 3 inches (8.31 m) and a draught of 10 feet 6 inches (3.20 m). The ship was propelled by three shafts driven by Brown-Curtis turbines powered by three Yarrow boilers creating 26,500 shaft horsepower (19,800 kW). This gave the ship a maximum speed of 35 knots (65 km/h; 40 mph). The destroyer carried 254 long tons (258 t) of fuel oil.

The destroyer was armed with three quick-firing (QF) 4-inch (102 mm)/45 calibre Mark IV guns in single mounts. The No.2 4-inch gun was placed on a bandstand, unlike earlier M-class destroyers. For secondary armament, the destroyer was equipped with a single QF 2-pounder "pom-pom" Mk.II and four 21-inch (533 mm) torpedo tubes in two twin mounts. As a Thornycroft "special", Patrician resembled the standard Admiralty version of the class with the exception of her flat-sided funnels and higher freeboard.

== Service history ==
=== Royal Navy ===
Patrician was one of two Thornycroft M-class destroyers ordered as part of the February 1915 Fourth War Programme. The keel was laid down by Thornycroft & Company at their Southampton yard in June 1915. The destroyer was launched on 5 June 1916 and completed in August 1916.

Patrician saw service throughout World War I. After commissioning, she was assigned to the 13th Destroyer Flotilla of the Grand Fleet from 1916 to 1917. In October 1918, Patrician was a member of the 15th Destroyer Flotilla attached to the Grand Fleet.

Following the end of the war, the Grand Fleet was abolished, forming the Atlantic Fleet, with more modern destroyers (mainly the V and W classes and the S class) supporting the fleet, while older destroyers went to subsidiary tasks or were laid up. Patrician was sent to the Firth of Forth, joining the Local Defence Flotilla. By November 1919, she was laid up in reserve at HMNB Portsmouth.

=== Royal Canadian Navy ===
In 1920, the destroyer was deemed surplus by the Royal Navy. By this point Canada was looking to replace the aging cruisers operated by the Royal Canadian Navy. The Royal Navy offered a light cruiser and two destroyers to replace the old cruisers. Patrician was chosen and transferred to the Royal Canadian Navy along with her sister, HMS Patriot. Before coming to Canada, the two destroyers required three major alterations. They needed one additional electrical engine for manoeuvering in harbour, an oil fuel galley to avoid storing coal for cooking and an enclosed bridge for service in the northern Atlantic Ocean. The total cost for these changes in both ships was $14,000. This did not include cost of adding heating.

The arrival of the three new ships, the two destroyers and the light cruiser HMS Aurora, caused the first installation of oil fuel tanks in Halifax and Victoria harbours. While sailing from the United Kingdom to Canada, it was found that while Patrician performed to expectations, the lack of service in the other two ships while awaiting transfer had caused their performances to decline. The three ships arrived at Halifax in late 1920. On 21 January 1921, the three ships departed for a cruise carrying secret documents from the Admiralty to British consulates throughout Central and North America. While on the cruise, the squadron was ordered to Puntarenas, Costa Rica, where their presence was used to strengthen the Canadian government position in negotiations over oil concessions.

Following the cruise, Patrician was ordered to the west coast of Canada in 1922, where she was used primarily as a training ship, though did perform some fisheries patrols. On 12 December 1924, she was sent to patrol for and intercept a group of bank thieves who had robbed a bank in Canada and were attempting to escape by boat to the United States. The search was ultimately unsuccessful. By 1927, it was reported that Patrician and Patriot had reached the end of their useful life. The vessels were in need of extensive repair and were showing signs of wear. By the end of the year the King government decided to replace the aging destroyers with two on loan from the United Kingdom and two purpose-built destroyers. Patrician was put up for sale in 1929 and was broken up at Esquimalt, British Columbia that same year.
