= HMS Restless =

Destroyer of the Royal Navy

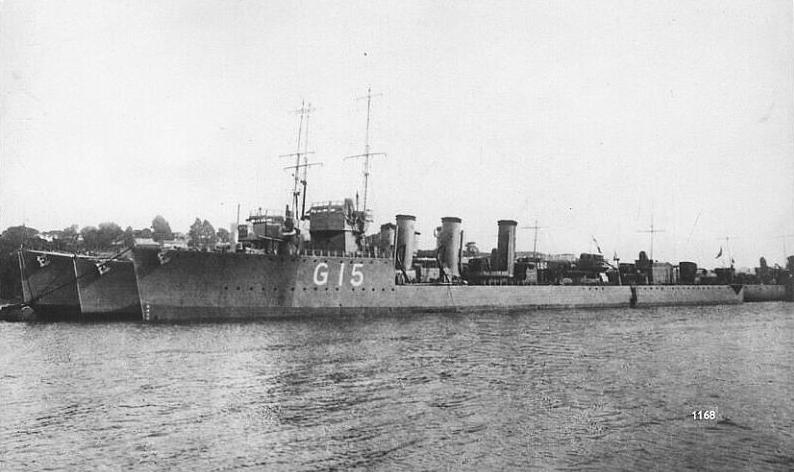
- R-class destroyers, sistership HMS Romola nearest

History

United Kingdom
- Name: HMS Restless
- Builder: John Brown & Company, Clydebank
- Yard number: 451
- Laid down: 22 September 1915
- Launched: 12 August 1916
- Commissioned: 21 October 1916
- Decommissioned: 23 November 1936
- Fate: Broken up

General characteristics
- Class & type: R-class destroyer
- Displacement: 975 long tons (991 t) normal; 1,173 long tons (1,192 t) deep load
- Length: 265 ft (80.8 m) p.p.
- Beam: 26 ft 9 in (8.15 m)
- Draught: 9 ft 10 in (3.00 m)
- Propulsion: 3 Yarrow boilers; 2 geared Brown-Curtis steam turbines, 27,000 shp (20,000 kW)
- Speed: 36 knots (41.4 mph; 66.7 km/h)
- Range: 3,440 nmi (6,370 km) at 15 kn (28 km/h)
- Complement: 82
- Armament: 3 × QF 4-inch (101.6 mm) Mark IV guns, mounting P Mk. IX; 1 × single 2-pounder (40-mm) "pom-pom" Mk. II anti-aircraft gun; 4 × 21 in (533 mm) torpedo tubes (2×2)

HMS Restless was an R-class destroyer which served with the Royal Navy during World War I. Launched on 12 August 1916, the ship operated as part of the Grand Fleet, operating as part of a destroyer flotilla protecting convoys in the North Sea. After the War, the destroyer served in the Mediterranean Sea and was sold to be broken up on 23 November 1936.

== Design and development ==
Restless was one of seventeen R-class destroyers ordered by the British Admiralty in July 1915 as part of the Sixth War Construction Programme. The destroyer was 265 feet (80.77 m) long between perpendiculars, with a beam of 26 feet 9 inches (8.15 m) and a draught of 9 feet 10 inches (3.00 m). Displacement was 975 long tons (991 t) normal and 1,173 long tons (1,192 t) deep load. Power was provided by three Yarrow boilers feeding two Brown-Curtis geared steam turbines rated at 27,000 shaft horsepower (20,000 kW) and driving two shafts, to give a design speed of 36 knots (67 km/h; 41 mph). Three funnels were fitted. A total of 296 long tons (301 t) of fuel oil was carried, giving a design range of 3,450 nautical miles (6,390 km; 3,970 mi) at 15 knots (28 km/h; 17 mph).

Armament consisted of three 4 in (100 mm) Mk IV QF guns on the ship's centreline, with one on the forecastle, one aft on a raised platform and one between the second and third funnels. A single 2-pounder (40 mm) pom-pom anti-aircraft gun was carried, while torpedo armament consisted of two twin mounts for 21 in (533 mm) torpedoes. The ship had a complement of 82 officers and ratings.

== Construction and career ==
Restless was laid down by John Brown & Company at Clydebank on the River Clyde on 22 September 1915 and launched on 12 August 1916, leaving the yard on 21 October that year. The destroyer was allocated the yard number 451. Total build time was 324 days, with 70 days spent at the yard in fit-out.

On commissioning, Restless joined the 15th Destroyer Flotilla of the Grand Fleet and served there until 1919. The Flotilla was involved in supporting the convoys that crossed the North Sea, including taking part in anti-submarine patrols between 15 and 24 June 1917. Although sixty-one sightings of submarines and twelve attacks were reported during that operation, no submarines were sunk. On 24 April 1918 the Flotilla was called to intercept the High Seas Fleet on what was to prove the last expedition by the German Navy of the War.

After the War, Restless was stationed in Gibraltar as part of the local defence flotilla. On 23 November 1936, the destroyer was given to Thos. W. Ward of Sheffield in exchange for RMS Majestic and was subsequently broken up at Briton Ferry.

== Pennant numbers ==
Pennant number	Date
G88	1917
G85	1918
