= HMS Partridge (1916) =

Destroyer of the Royal Navy

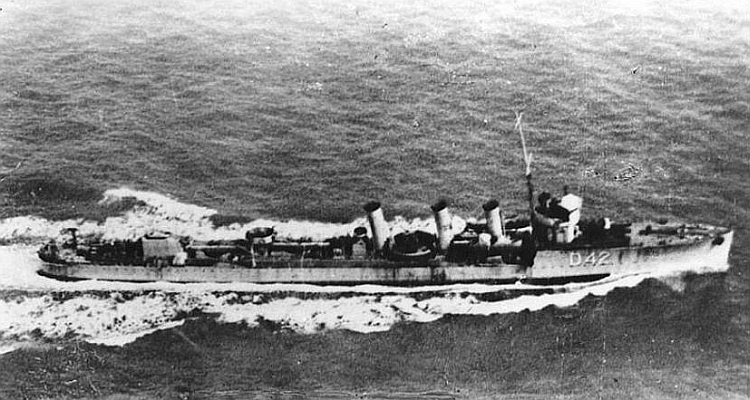

HMS Partridge was a Royal Navy Admiralty M-class destroyer constructed and then operational in the First World War, later being sunk by enemy action in 1917. The destroyer was the sixth Royal Navy vessel to carry the name Partridge.

== Design and construction ==
The Admiralty M class were improved and faster versions of the preceding Laforey-class destroyer. They displaced 971 long tons (987 t). The ships had an overall length of 273 feet 4 inches (83.3 m), a beam of 26 feet 8 inches (8.1 m) and a draught of 9 feet 8 inches (2.9 m). Partridge was powered by three Brown-Curtis direct-drive impulse steam turbines, each driving one propeller shaft, with geared cruising turbines, using steam provided by three Yarrow boilers. The turbines developed a total of 25,000 shaft horsepower (19,000 kW) and gave a maximum speed of 34 knots (63 km/h; 39 mph). The ships carried a maximum of 237 long tons (241 t) of fuel oil that gave them a range of 2,100 nautical miles (3,900 km; 2,400 mi) at 15 knots (28 km/h; 17 mph). The ships' complement was 76 officers and ratings.

The ships were armed with three single QF 4-inch (102 mm) Mark IV guns and two QF 2-pounder (40 mm) "pom-pom" anti-aircraft guns. The ships were also fitted with two above water twin mounts for 21-inch (533 mm) torpedoes.

The outbreak of the First World War in August 1914 resulted in the Admiralty placing a series of large orders for destroyers to the design of the existing M-class to speed production. Partridge was one of 16 Admiralty M-class destroyers ordered as part of the Fourth War Construction Programme in February 1915. She was laid down at Swan Hunter's Wallsend shipyard in July 1915, launched on 4 March 1916 and completed in June that year.

== Service ==
The vessel was assigned to the Fourteenth Destroyer Flotilla by July 1916. On 14 February 1917, Partridge, together with the destroyers Plover, Portia and Rob Roy, was ordered to patrol between Peterhead and Aberdeen to counter the German submarine UC-44, which had been attacking trawlers. UC-44 completed her patrol unharmed.

On 11 December 1917 the destroyer left from Lerwick in the Shetland Islands, along with HMS Pellew and several armed trawlers to escort six merchant ships to Bergen, in Norway. The convoy was spotted by a flotilla of German destroyers and they unsuccessfully fought an engagement with the attacking destroyers, with Partridge being hit repeatedly by shells and torpedoes. The destroyer subsequently sank in the North Sea on 12 December 1917. Reports indicate that 97 of the crew were killed and only 24 were rescued. Among the dead was Edward John Buley, who had survived the sinking of the RMS Titanic five years earlier. The wreck is believed to be off the Norwegian coast. One incident of reported heroism in the sinking, in which a Lieutenant Grey sacrificed a place in a life-raft for another officer resulted in the award of the Stanhope Gold Medal by the Royal Humane Society.

== Bibliography ==
- Colledge, J. J.; Warlow, Ben (2006) [1969]. Ships of the Royal Navy: The Complete Record of All Fighting Ships of the Royal Navy from the 15th Century to the Present (3rd Rev ed.). London: Chatham Publishing. ISBN 978-1-86176-281-8. OCLC 67375475.
- Dittmar, F.J.; Colledge, J.J. (1972). British Warships 1914–1919. Shepperton, UK: Ian Allan. ISBN 0-7110-0380-7.
- Friedman, Norman (2009). British Destroyers: From Earliest Days to the Second World War. Barnsley, UK: Seaforth Publishing. ISBN 978-1-84832-049-9.
- Gardiner, Robert & Gray, Randal, eds. (1985). Conway's All The World's Fighting Ships 1906–1921. London: Conway Maritime Press. ISBN 0-85177-245-5.
- Halpern, Paul G. (1995). A Naval History of World War I. London: UCL Press Limited. ISBN 1-85728-498-4.
- March, Edgar J. (1966). British Destroyers: A History of Development, 1892–1953; Drawn by Admiralty Permission From Official Records & Returns, Ships' Covers & Building Plans. London: Seeley Service. OCLC 164893555.
- McBride, Keith (1991). "British 'M' Class Destroyers of 1913–14". In Gardiner, Robert (ed.). Warship 1991. London: Conway Maritime Press. pp. 34–49. ISBN 0-85177-582-9.
- Monograph No. 34: Home Waters Part VIII: December 1916 to April 1917 (PDF). Naval Staff Monographs (Historical). Vol. XVIII. Naval Staff, Training and Staff Duties Division. 1933.
