= Thornycroft M-class destroyer =

1914 class of British destroyers

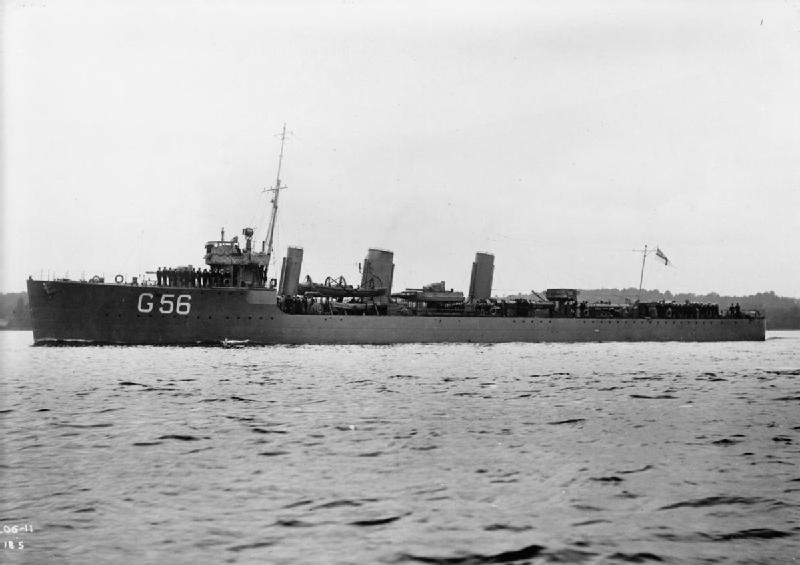
- HMS Patrician

Class overview
- Name: Thornycroft M class
- Builders: Thornycroft
- Operators: Royal Navy; Royal Canadian Navy
- Built: 1913–1916
- In commission: 1914–1929
- Completed: 6

General characteristics
- Type: Destroyer
- Displacement: 985 – 1,070 tons
- Length: 274 ft (83.5 m) o/a
- Beam: 27 ft 9 in (8.46 m) (Meteor & Mastiff); 27 ft 3 in (8.31 m) (Patrician, Patriot, Rapid & Ready)
- Draught: 10 ft 6 in (3.20 m)
- Propulsion: Parsons (Meteor & Mastiff) or Brown-Curtis (Patrician, Patriot, Rapid & Ready) steam turbines; 26,500 shp (19,800 kW); 2 shafts
- Speed: 35 knots (65 km/h; 40 mph)
- Range: 255 tons of oil
- Complement: 78
- Armament: 3 × QF 4-inch (102 mm) Mark IV guns, mounting P Mk.IX; 1 × single QF 2-pounder "pom-pom" Mk.II; 2 × twin 21 in (533 mm) torpedo tubes

The Thornycroft M or Mastiff class were a class of six British destroyers completed for the Royal Navy during 1914–16 for World War I service. They were quite different from the Admiralty-designed ships of the Admiralty M class, although based on a basic sketch layout provided by the British Admiralty from which J I Thornycroft developed their own design. Like the 'standard' Admiralty M class they had three funnels, but the centre funnel was thicker in the Thornycroft ships. The midships 4-inch (100 mm) gun was shipped between the second and third funnels. Patriot was fitted to carry a kite balloon.

== Ships ==
Two ships were ordered (contracted) on 1 February 1913, two more on 26 February 1915 and the last two on 15 May 1915.

- Meteor – laid down 8 May 1913, launched 24 July 1914, completed 15 September 1914. Sold for breaking up 9 May 1921.
- Mastiff – laid down 10 July 1913, launched 5 September 1914, completed 12 November 1914. Sold for breaking up 9 May 1921.
- Patrician – laid down 3 June 1915, launched 5 June 1916, completed 4 August 1916. Transferred to Royal Canadian Navy in September 1920, subsequently scrapped in 1929 at Esquimalt.
- Patriot – laid down 15 July 1915, launched 20 April 1916, completed 27 June 1916. Transferred to Royal Canadian Navy in September 1920, subsequently sold for breaking up in 1929 at Briton Ferry.
- Rapid – laid down 12 August 1915, launched 15 July 1916, completed 19 September 1916. Sold for breaking up 20 April 1927.
- Ready – laid down 2 September 1915, launched 26 August 1916, completed 31 October 1916. Sold for breaking up 13 July 1926.

Note Thornycroft also built six other M-class destroyers for the Royal Navy – Michael, Milbrook, Minion and Munster, all ordered on 20 September 1914, and Nepean and Nereus, both ordered on 20 November 1914; however these were to the Admiralty 'M' design and are included with the article on that large group of destroyers.

== Sources ==
Media related to Thornycroft M class destroyer at Wikimedia Commons

- Destroyers of the Royal Navy, 1893–1981, Maurice Cocker, 1983, Ian Allan ISBN 0-7110-1075-7
- Jane's Fighting Ships, 1919, Jane's Publishing.
- The Thornycroft List, 1981 (unpublished compilation of J.I.Thornycroft records).
