= RFA Bacchus (1915) =

1915 stores freighter and distilling ship of the Royal Fleet Auxiliary

History

United Kingdom
- Name: RFA Bacchus
- Builder: William Hamilton and Company, Port Glasgow
- Launched: 10 May 1915
- Commissioned: 1915
- Decommissioned: 1937
- Renamed: RFA Bacchus II, May 1936
- Fate: Sunk as target, 15 November 1938

General characteristics
- Displacement: 3,598 long tons (3,656 t)
- Length: 295 ft 1 in (89.94 m) p/p
- Beam: 44 ft 1 in (13.44 m)
- Draught: 20 ft 8 in (6.30 m)
- Propulsion: 2 × 3-cylinder triple expansion steam engines; Two shafts
- Speed: 10 knots (19 km/h)
- Complement: 52

RFA Bacchus was a stores freighter and distilling ship of the Royal Fleet Auxiliary. Built by William Hamilton and Company, of Port Glasgow for the Indo-China Steam Navigation Company and purchased by the Admiralty while on the stocks on 22 March 1915.

On 4 May 1928, Bacchus was in collision with the Greek cargo ship Ioannis Falafos in the English Channel 20 nautical miles (37 km) south of St. Alban's Head, Dorset. Ioannis Falafos sank in three minutes with the loss of ten of her 22 crew. The survivors were initially rescued by Bacchus but she was severely damaged at the bows and was abandoned as it was thought that she would sink too. The British cargo ship Manchester Commerce took all on board. Bacchus was later reboarded once it became apparent that she would remain afloat. She was towed into Portland Harbour stern-first by an Admiralty tug. Bacchus was subsequently repaired and returned to service.

She was renamed RFA Bacchus II in May 1936 in order to free the name for a new ship. She was sunk as target on 15 November 1938 over the Hurd Deep, 10 miles (16 km) off Alderney in the Channel Islands, by gunfire from the cruiser HMS Dunedin.
