= Rob Roy 23 =

1980s US recreational keelboat

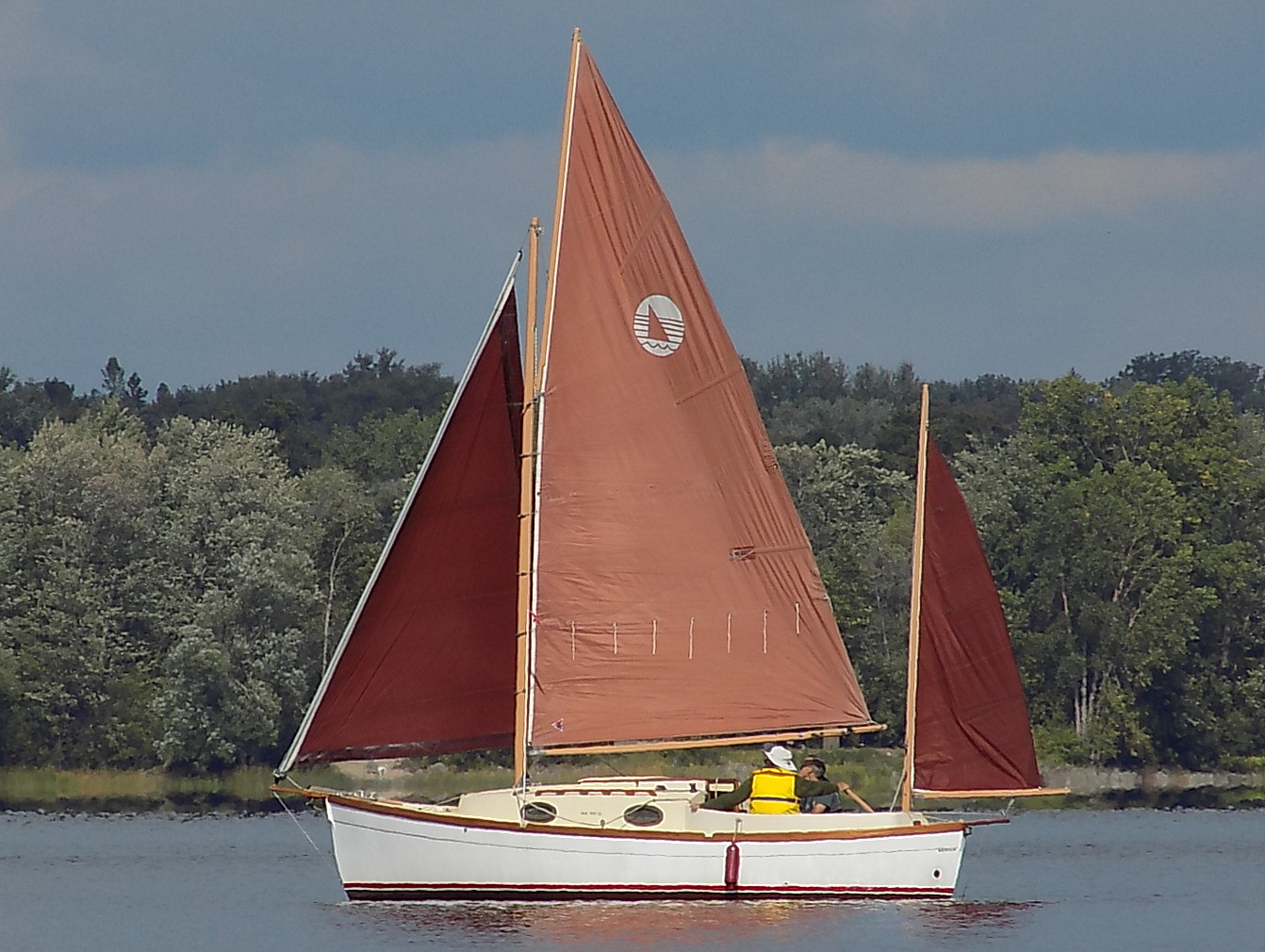

Development
- Designer: Edward S. Brewer
- Location: United States
- Year: 1980
- Builder: Marine Concepts
- Name: Rob Roy 23

Boat
- Displacement: 2,800 lb (1,270 kg)
- Draft: 4.67 ft (1.42 m)

Hull
- Type: Monohull
- Construction: Fiberglass
- LOA: 22.67 ft (6.91 m)
- LWL: 21.00 ft (6.40 m)
- Beam: 6.92 ft (2.11 m)

Hull appendages
- Keel: centerboard keel
- Ballast: 900 lb (408 kg)
- Rudder: internally-mounted spade-type rudder

Rig
- General: Fractional rigged yawl

Sails
- Total sail area: 255 sq ft (23.7 m^{2})

Racing
- PHRF: 201

The Rob Roy 23 is a recreational keelboat built by Marine Concepts in Tarpon Springs, Florida, United States. The design is a cabin version of the Sun Seeker 23 daysailer, which was also built by Marine Concepts.

== Design ==
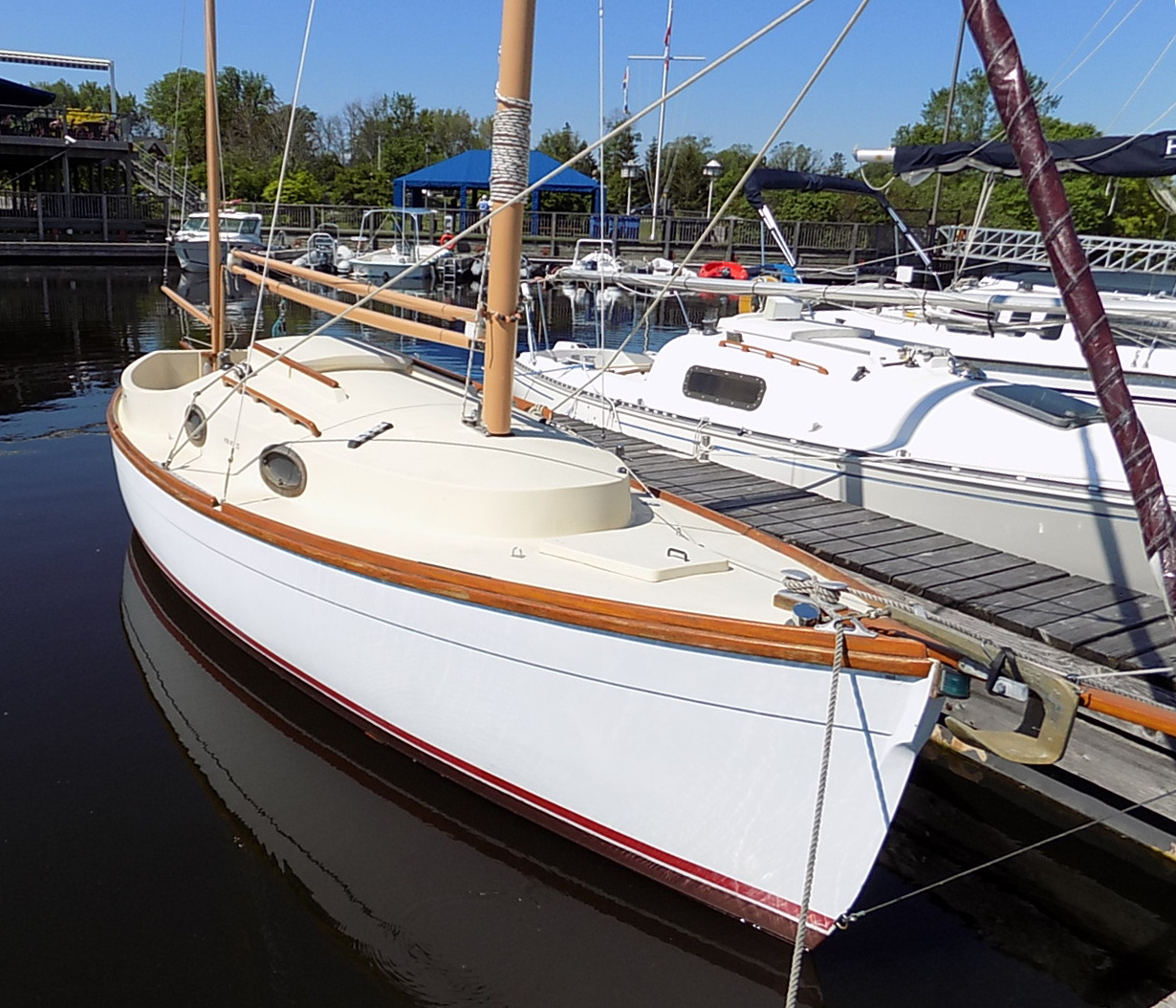
Rob Roy 23

The Rob Roy 23 is built predominantly of fiberglass, with wood trim. It is a fractional Gunter rigged yawl and has an internally-mounted spade-type rudder and an L-shaped centerboard keel. It displaces 2,800 lb (1,270 kg) and carries 900 lb (408 kg) of ballast.

The boat has a draft of 4.67 ft (1.42 m) with the centerboard down and 1.50 ft (0.46 m) with it retracted, allowing operation in shallow water or ground transportation on a trailer.

The boat is normally fitted with a small 3 to 6 hp (2 to 4 kW) well-mounted outboard motor for docking and maneuvering. The fuel tank holds 12 U.S. gallons (45 L; 10.0 imp gal) and the fresh water tank has a capacity of 14 U.S. gallons (53 L; 12 imp gal).

The design has sleeping accommodation for two or three people, depending on layout. It has two straight settee berths in the main cabin and the option of a third berth angled in the bow. The galley is located on both sides in the bow. The galley equipped with a two-burner stove to port and a sink to starboard. The head in the forward part of the bow. Cabin headroom is 48 in (122 cm).

The design has a PHRF racing average handicap of 201 and a hull speed of 6.1 kn (11.3 km/h).

== Reception ==
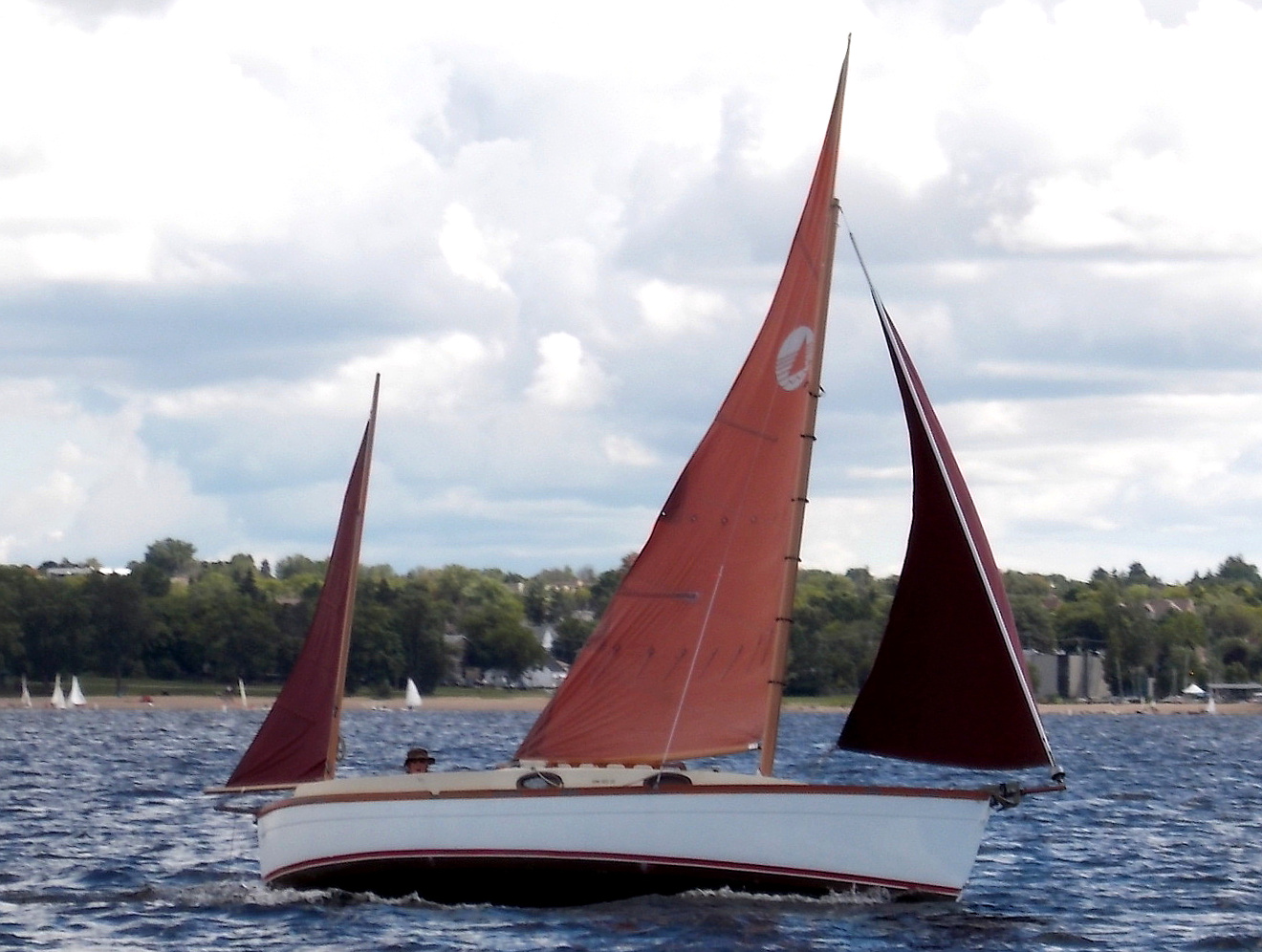
Rob Roy 23

In a 2010 review Steve Henkel wrote, "there's nothing like a yawl rig to give character to a small sailboat. Add a canoe stern, comfortable accommodations for two (or three if you opt for a single berth forward squeezed in next to the head), reasonably good construction and finishing, and you have the makings of a classic small yacht. Ted Brewer, whose life has been spent designing comfortable cruising boats, has succeeded here in his efforts to create just such a boat; and Marine Concepts, which left the business in 2006, did a good job of building her. Rob Roy had a relatively long production run, from 1983 to 2000, with a hiatus from 1994 to 1997. Best features: She's a salty-looking boat, with practical features such as a tabernacle for the main mast, an unstayed mizzen, an L-shaped centerboard that frees up cabin space by keeping the board trunk small and out of the way, and an in-cockpit engine well. And of course, as a yawl she has the advantage of easily shortening sail when it comes on to blow. Worst features: She is not very fast or weatherly versus her comp[etitor]s, partly a result of her divided rig and oddly shaped centerboard, though she does fine on a reach."

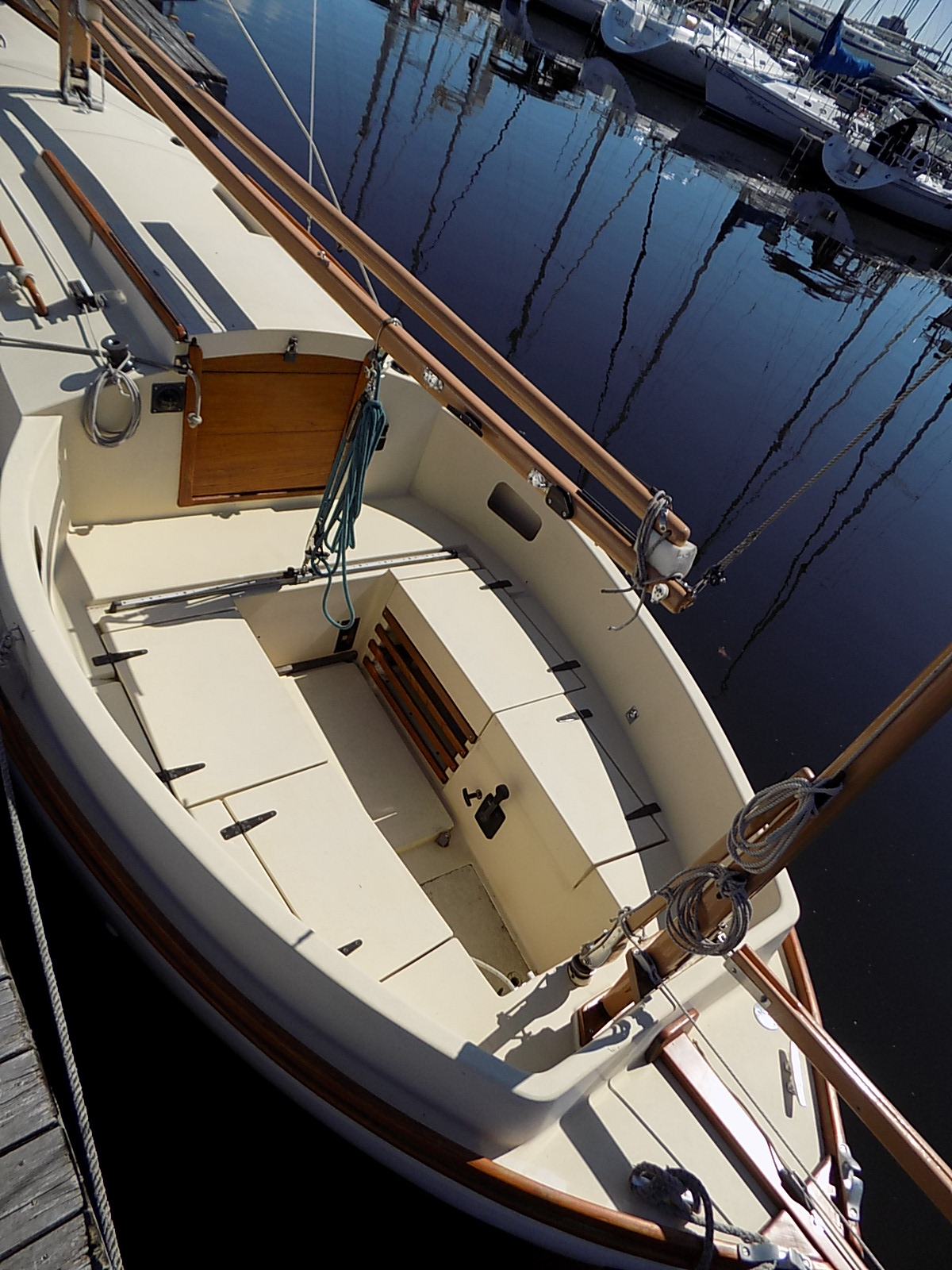
Rob Roy 23 cockpi
