= HMS M2 =

HMS M2 may refer to the following ships of the Royal Navy:

- HMS Havelock (M2) (1915), a monitor initially named M2
- HMS M2 (1918), the second M-class submarine

== See also ==
- HSwMS M2 (1937) (Swedish: HMS M2), a Swedish Royal Navy M-type minesweeper; see List of mine warfare vessels of the Swedish Navy
- HSwMS Älvsborg (M02) (1969) (Swedish: HMS M2), a Swedish Royal Navy minelayer
