= HMS Rocket (1916) =

Destroyer of the Royal Navy

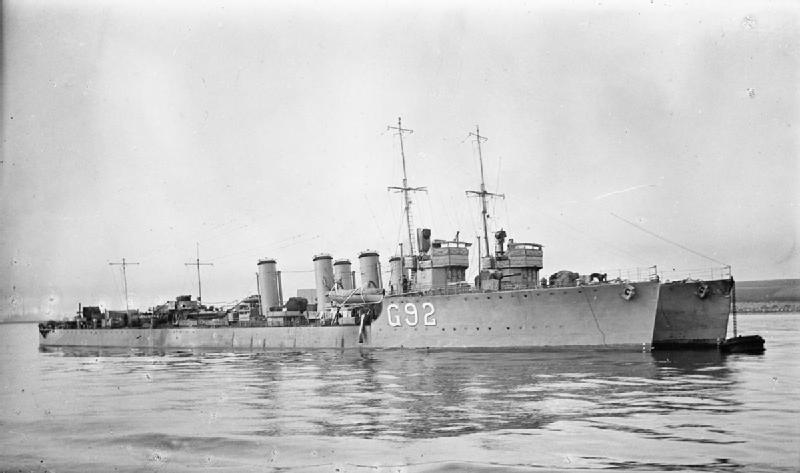
- Two R-class destroyers, sistership HMS Rob Roy nearest

History

United Kingdom
- Name: HMS Rocket
- Builder: Denny, Dumbarton
- Yard number: 1055
- Laid down: 28 September 1915
- Launched: 2 July 1916
- Commissioned: 7 October 1916
- Decommissioned: 16 December 1926
- Fate: Broken up

General characteristics
- Class & type: R-class destroyer
- Displacement: 975 long tons (991 t) (normal); 1,222.5 long tons (1,242 t) (deep load)
- Length: 265 ft (80.8 m) p.p.
- Beam: 26 ft 9 in (8.15 m)
- Draught: 8 ft 10 1/4 in (2.699 m)
- Propulsion: 3 Yarrow boilers; 2 geared Brown-Curtis steam turbines, 27,000 shp (20,000 kW)
- Speed: 36 knots (41.4 mph; 66.7 km/h)
- Range: 3,450 nmi (6,390 km) at 15 kn (28 km/h)
- Complement: 82
- Armament: 3 × single QF 4-inch (102 mm) Mark IV guns; 1 × single 2-pdr 40 mm (2 in) AA gun; 2 × twin 21 in (533 mm) torpedo tubes

HMS Rocket was an R-class destroyer which served with the Royal Navy during World War I. Launched on 2 July 1916 after being stuck on the slipway since 30 June, the ship joined the Grand Fleet, operating as part of a destroyer flotilla undertaking anti-submarine operations in the North Sea. Although the ship did not successfully engage any German submarines, there was an incident with the Royal Navy boat K7 on 16 June 1917, although that attack was aborted after the erstwhile target was identified as a friendly vessel. After the War, the destroyer served with the anti-submarine and torpedo schools at Portsmouth, and briefly during the Chanak Crisis of 1922, before being sold to be broken up on 16 December 1926.

== Design and development ==
Rocket was one of seventeen R-class destroyers delivered to the British Admiralty as part of the Sixth War Construction Programme. The order was one of three placed on 17 July 1915 with William Denny and Brothers at a cost £159,200 each. The destroyer was 265 feet (80.77 m) long between perpendiculars, with a beam of 26 feet 9 inches (8.15 m) and a draught of 8 feet 10 1/4 inches (2.70 m). Displacement was 975 long tons (991 t) normal and 1,222 1/2 long tons (1,242 t) deep load. Power was provided by three Yarrow boilers feeding two Brown-Curtis geared steam turbines rated at 27,000 shaft horsepower (20,000 kW) and driving two shafts, to give a design speed of 36 knots (67 km/h; 41 mph). Three funnels were fitted. A total of 296 long tons (301 t) of fuel oil were carried, giving a design range of 3,450 nautical miles (6,390 km; 3,970 mi) at 15 knots (28 km/h; 17 mph).

Armament consisted of three single 4-inch (102 mm) Mk IV guns on the ship's centreline, with one on the forecastle, one aft on a raised platform and one between the second and third funnels. A single 2-pounder (40 mm) pom-pom anti-aircraft gun was carried, while torpedo armament consisted of two twin mounts for 21 in (533 mm) torpedoes. The ship had a complement of 82 officers and ratings.

== Construction and career ==
Rocket was laid down by William Denny and Brothers at Dumbarton on the River Clyde on 28 September 1915 with the yard number 1055. Launching was to have taken place on 30 June 1916 but the destroyer got stuck on the slipway so was not launched until 2 July 1916 and had to leave for the dock for repairs, finally leaving the yard on 22 September. The ship entered service on 22 December that year.

On commissioning, Rocket joined the 15th Destroyer Flotilla of the Grand Fleet and served there until 1919. The Flotilla was involved in supporting the convoys that crossed the North Sea, including taking part in anti-submarine patrols between 15 and 24 June 1917. Although sixty-one sightings of submarines and twelve attacks were reported during that operation, no submarines were sunk. During these patrols, a potential friendly fire incident with the Royal Navy submarine K7 took place on 16 June. The swift action of Lieutenant-Commander G.H. Kellett, commander of the submarine, surfacing and signalling the destroyers, prevented the encounter becoming fatal. On 24 April 1918 the Flotilla was called to intercept the High Seas Fleet on what was to prove the last expedition by the German Navy of the War.

After the War, Rocket was allocated to the torpedo school at Portsmouth attached to Vernon. The vessel briefly served as part of a flotilla with sisterships Rigorous and Romola patrolling the Dardanelles during the Chanak Crisis of 1922. Subsequently, the ship returned to Portsmouth to join the anti-submarine school. However, in 1923, the Navy decided to scrap many of the older destroyers in preparation for the introduction of newer and larger vessels. Rocket was one of the destroyers chosen for retirement. On 16 December 1926, the destroyer was sold to Thos. W. Ward of Sheffield and broken up.

== Pennant numbers ==
Pennant number	Date
G82	January 1917
G88	January 1918
G43	January 1919
H76	January 1922
