= HMS Plover (1916) =

British M-Class destroyer, WW1

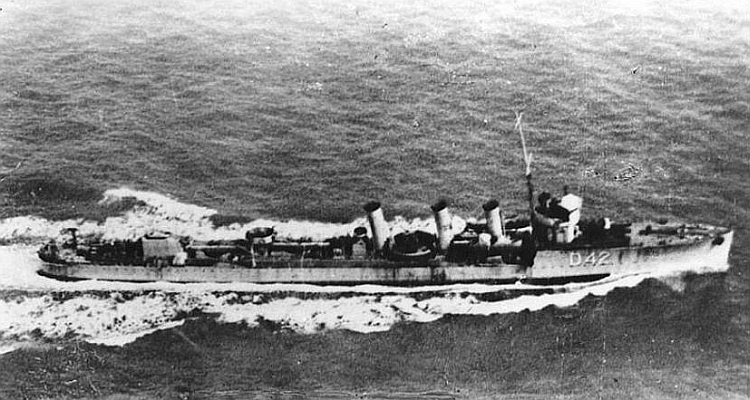
- Sister ship HMS Pasley

History

United Kingdom
- Name: HMS Plover
- Namesake: Plover
- Ordered: September 1914
- Builder: Hawthorn Leslie, Hebburn
- Laid down: 14 July 1915
- Launched: 3 March 1916
- Completed: 2 June 1916
- Out of service: 9 May 1921
- Fate: Sold to be broken up

General characteristics
- Class & type: Admiralty M-class destroyer
- Displacement: 994 long tons (1,010 t) normal; 1,028 long tons (1,044 t) full load
- Length: 265 ft (80.8 m)
- Beam: 26 ft 7 in (8.1 m)
- Draught: 8 ft 7 in (2.62 m)
- Propulsion: 3 Yarrow boilers; 2 Parsons steam turbines, 25,000 shp (19,000 kW)
- Speed: 34 knots (39.1 mph; 63.0 km/h)
- Range: 3,450 nmi (6,390 km) at 15 kn (28 km/h)
- Complement: 76
- Armament: 3 × QF 4-inch (102 mm) Mark IV guns (3×1); 1 × single 2-pounder (40-mm) "pom-pom" Mk. II anti-aircraft gun (1×1); 4 × 21 in (533 mm) torpedo tubes (2×2)

HMS Plover was a Admiralty M-class destroyer which served with the Royal Navy during the First World War. The M class were an improvement on the previous L-class, capable of higher speed. Launched on 3 March 1916 by Hawthorn Leslie on the River Tyne, the vessel served as part of the Grand Fleet. Plover was based at Scapa Flow and took part in sorties in response to German submarine activity. After an uneventful war, the destroyer was placed in reserve and decommissioned, being sold to be broken up on 9 May 1921.

== Design and development ==
Plover was one of sixteen Admiralty M-class destroyers ordered by the British Admiralty in May 1915 as part of the Fifth War Construction Programme. The M-class was an improved version of the earlier L-class, required to reach the higher speed in order to counter rumoured German fast destroyers. The vessels ordered in May 1915 differed from earlier members of the class in having a raking stem and are sometimes known as the Repeat M class.

The destroyer was 265 feet (80.77 m) long overall, with a beam of 26 feet 7 inches (8.10 m) and a draught of 8 feet 7 inches (2.62 m). displacement was 994 long tons (1,010 t) normal and 1,028 long tons (1,044 t) full load. Power was provided by three Yarrow boilers feeding two Parsons steam turbines rated at 25,000 shaft horsepower (19,000 kW) and driving two shafts, to give a design speed of 34 knots (63 km/h; 39 mph). Three funnels were fitted. 296 long tons (301 t) of oil were carried, giving a design range of 3,450 nautical miles (6,390 km; 3,970 mi) at 15 knots (28 km/h; 17 mph).

Armament consisted of three 4 in (102 mm) Mk IV QF guns on the ship's centreline, with one on the forecastle, one aft on a raised platform and one between the middle and aft funnels. A single 2-pounder (40 mm) pom-pom anti-aircraft gun was carried, while torpedo armament consisted of two twin mounts for 21 in (533 mm) torpedoes. A kite balloon and searchlight was fitted in 1918. The ship had a complement of 76 officers and ratings.

== Construction and career ==
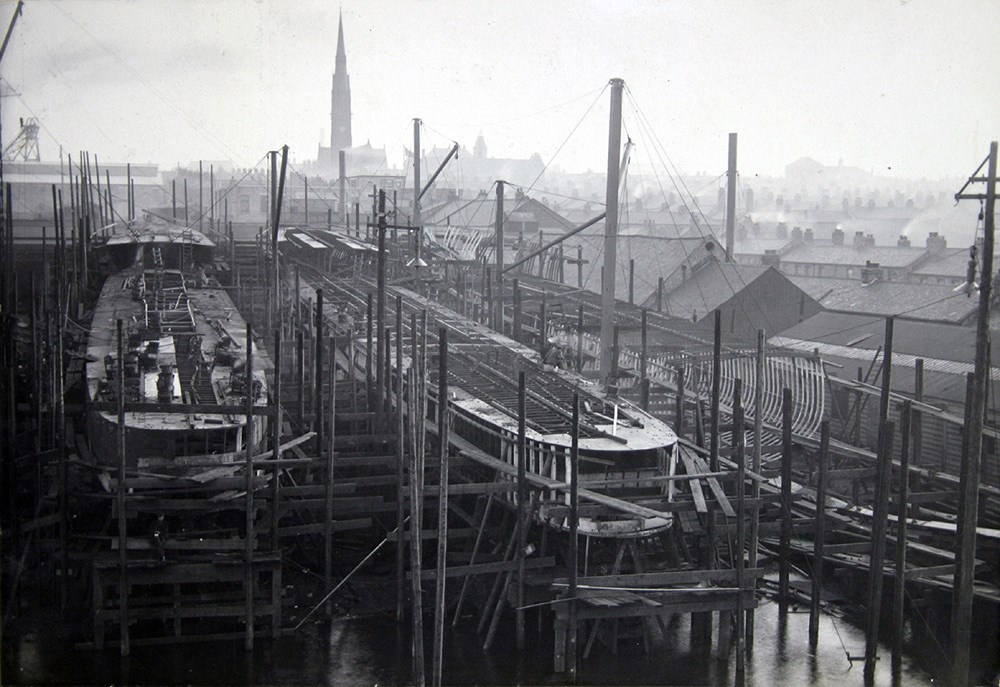
Plover under construction alongside Pigeon and Sarpedon

Plover was laid down by Hawthorn Leslie of Hebburn on the River Tyne on 14 July 1915, launched on 3 March the following year and completed on 2 June. The ship was the third of the name, named after the birds. The vessel was deployed as part of the Grand Fleet, joining the Fourteenth Destroyer Flotilla, remaining there until the end of the war. The flotilla was based at the Royal Navy base at Scapa Flow. The destroyer had a relatively uneventful war, occasionally taking part in sorties to search for submarines. On 14 February 1917, for example, Plover formed part of a flotilla of four destroyers that patrolled the area off the coast between Aberdeen and Peterhead, although in this instance no enemy vessels were found.

After the war, the Royal Navy returned to a peacetime level of mobilisation, and surplus vessels were culled. Plover was placed alongside 50 other destroyers in reserve at Portsmouth. On 9 May 1921, the vessel was sold to Thos. W. Ward of Hayle and broken up.

== Pennant numbers ==
Pennant number	Date
G65	September 1915
G87	January 1917
G29	January 1919
