= Robert Roy (cricketer) =

New Zealand cricketer (born 1948)

Personal information
- Full name: Robert Alexander Roy
- Born: 7 October 1948 (age 77); Gore, Southland, New Zealand
- Batting: Left-handed
- Bowling: Slow left-arm orthodox

Domestic team information
- Years: Team
- 1968/69: Southland
- 1970/71–1971/72: Otago
- 1979/80: Central Otago
- Source: CricInfo, 22 May 2016

Robert Alexander Roy (born 7 October 1948) is a New Zealand former cricketer. He played four first-class matches for Otago during the 1970–71 and 1971–72 seasons.

Roy was born at Gore in the Southland Region of New Zealand in 1948. He played age-group cricket for Otago and for Southland in the Hawke Cup before making his representative debut for Otago in December 1970. Primarily a slow left-arm orthodox bowler, on debut against Wellington Roy took one wicket and made scores of 22 and 30 runs in a Plunket Shield match ar Carisbrook. He went on to play two other Shield matches during the season, taking three wickets against Northern Districts in his second match.

The following season Roy played a single first-class match against a New Zealand under-23 side towards the end of the domestic season, his final top-level match. He played for Central Otago in the Hawke Cup during the 1979–80 season.
