= HMS Trenchant (1916) =

Destroyer of the Royal Navy

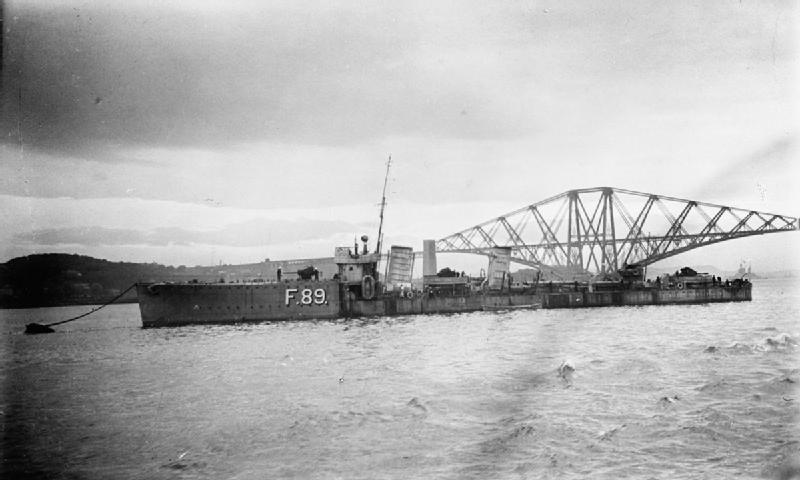
- Sister ship Tristram

History

United Kingdom
- Name: HMS Trenchant
- Builder: J. Samuel White, Cowes
- Launched: 23 December 1916
- Commissioned: 30 April 1917
- Decommissioned: 15 November 1928
- Fate: Broken up

General characteristics
- Class & type: Modified Admiralty R-class destroyer
- Displacement: 1,085 long tons (1,102 t)
- Length: 276 ft (84.1 m)
- Beam: 27 ft (8.2 m)
- Draught: 11 ft (3.4 m)
- Propulsion: 3 White-Forster boilers; 2 geared Brown-Curtis steam turbines, 27,000 shp (20,000 kW)
- Speed: 36 knots (41.4 mph; 66.7 km/h)
- Range: 3,450 nmi (6,390 km) at 15 kn (28 km/h)
- Complement: 82
- Armament: 3 × QF 4-inch (101.6 mm) Mark IV guns, mounting P Mk. IX; 1 × single 2-pounder (40-mm) "pom-pom" Mk. II anti-aircraft gun; 4 × 21 in (533 mm) torpedo tubes (2×2)

HMS Trenchant was a modified Admiralty R-class destroyer which served with the Royal Navy. The vessel was the first of the modified design. Launched in 1916, the ship operated with the Grand Fleet during the First World War. The vessel was involved in escorting convoys and attacking German submarines. After the war, Trenchant was attacked by Republican forces during the Irish War of Independence but suffered little damage. The vessel was retired and sold to be broken up on 15 November 1928. The subsequent S-class are sometimes called Modified Trenchant class.

== Design and development ==
Trenchant was one of ten Modified R-class destroyers ordered by the British Admiralty in March 1916 as part of the Eighth War Construction Programme. The vessel was the first of the new design, which differed from the previous R class in being larger, although they retained the same armament. The related S-class which followed are sometimes called the Modified Trenchant class.

Trenchant was 276 feet (84.12 m) long overall, with a beam of 27 feet (8.2 m) and a draught of 11 feet (3.35 m). Displacement was 1,085 long tons (1,102 t). Power was provided by three White-Forster boilers feeding two Brown-Curtis geared steam turbines rated at 27,000 shaft horsepower (20,000 kW) and driving two shafts, to give a design speed of 36 knots (67 km/h; 41 mph). Two funnels were fitted, two boilers exhausting through the forward funnel. A total of 296 long tons (301 t) of fuel oil was carried, giving a design range of 3,450 nautical miles (6,390 km; 3,970 mi) at 15 knots (28 km/h; 17 mph).

Armament consisted of three QF 4in Mk IV guns on the ship's centreline, with one on the forecastle, one on a raised platform aft and one between the funnels. A single 2-pounder (40 mm) pom-pom anti-aircraft gun was carried, while torpedo armament consisted of two twin rotating mounts for 21 in (533 mm) torpedoes. The ship had a complement of 82 officers and ratings.

== Construction and career ==
Trenchant was laid down by J. Samuel White at East Cowes on the Isle of Wight with the yard number 1481, and launched on 28 June the following year. The vessel was the first of the name, recalling the species of Marten, and was launched on 23 December 1916.

On commissioning, Trenchant joined the 15th Destroyer Flotilla of the Grand Fleet, and served there until 1919. The vessel was used for anti-submarine patrols. On 15 June 1917, the destroyer unsuccessfully attacked a German U-boat with a depth charge. A similar sweep on 24 June, in response to the torpedoing of SS Bolette by SM U-19, with sister ships Rob Roy and Rowena similarly yielded no results. A related role was of convoy escort. For example, on 14 August, Trenchant formed part of the escort for convoy HH13, which arrived without losing a ship. Occasionally, action involved working with larger fleets. For example, on 16 October, the destroyer accompanied the 2nd Light Cruiser Squadron to search for German minelayers. No minelayers were found.

When the Grand Fleet was disbanded, Trenchant was transferred to the 5th Destroyer Flotilla of the Home Fleet, under the Flag of King George V, and then acted as a tender to the depot ship Blake. The vessel was reduced to reduced complement on 15 February 1919. While undergoing a refit in Haulbowline on 3 June 1921, Trenchant was attacked by Republican forces during the Irish War of Independence but suffered little damage. The destroyer was retired sold to be broken up on 15 November 1928.

== Pennant numbers ==
Pennant number	Date
G96	1917
G78	1918

== Bibliography ==
- Colledge, J.J.; Warlow, Ben (2010). Ships of the Royal Navy: The Complete Record of All Fighting Ships of the Royal Navy. Haverhill: Casemate. ISBN 978-1-93514-907-1.
- Dittmar, F.J.; Colledge, J.J. (1972). British Warships 1914–1919. Shepperton: Ian Allan. ISBN 978-0-71100-380-4.
- Friedman, Norman (2009). British Destroyers: From Earliest Days to the First World War. Barnsley: Seaforth Publishing. ISBN 978-1-84832-049-9.
- Gardiner, Robert; Gray, Randal, eds. (1985). Conway's All the World's Fighting Ships 1906–1921. London: Conway Maritime Press. ISBN 978-0-85177-245-5.
- Manning, Thomas Davys; Walker, Charles Frederick (1959). British Warship Names. London: Putnam. OCLC 780274698.
- Monograph No. 34: Home Waters Part XIX: December 1916 to April1917. Naval Staff Monographs (Historical). Vol. XIX. Naval Staff, Training and Staff Duties Division. 1933.
- Newbolt, Henry (1931). Naval Operations: Volume V. History of the Great War. London: Longmans, Green and Co. OCLC 220475309.
- Parkes, Oscar; Prendergast, Maurice (1969). Jane's Fighting Ships 1919. Newton Abbott: David & Charles. OCLC 907574860.
- Williams, David L.; Sprake, Raymond F. (1993). White's of Cowes : "White's-built, well-built!". Peterborough: Silver Link. ISBN 978-1-85794-011-4.
