= Robert H. Roy =

American mechanical engineer (1906–2000)

Robert Hall Roy (November 21, 1906 – October 8, 2000) was an American mechanical engineer and the former Dean of Engineering Science at Johns Hopkins University. He was born in Baltimore, Maryland.

Roy enrolled in mechanical engineering at Johns Hopkins in 1925, where he played lacrosse and was a member of the school's national championship team. He was a defender on the U.S. national lacrosse team that competed in the 1928 Summer Olympics in Amsterdam, where lacrosse was a demonstration sport.

After returning from the Olympics, Roy joined Waverly Press, where he worked in engineering and later became a vice president. In 1939, he was invited to teach Industrial Organization and Management in the evening college of Johns Hopkins. After World War II, he was appointed an associate professor of Industrial Engineering in the Department of Mechanical Engineering, and then assistant dean.

Roy's testimony in 1952 helped nine African Americans gain admission to the A course at Baltimore Polytechnic Institute.

Roy was appointed Dean of Engineering in 1956, and retired in 1973. He was appointed Director of Chesapeake Research Consortium, which covered environmental concerns of state of Maryland. In 1970, he was appointed to the board of governors of Washington College. During his tenure at JHU, he received top awards in Industrial Engineering from the Institute of Industrial Engineers and served on many organizations for engineering education. The Institute of Industrial Engineers (Maryland Chapter) created a Robert H. Roy medal to be given annually to a student from Baltimore Polytechnic School. His former students and colleagues created a Robert H. Roy Fund in his honor in 1991 for graduate students.

Roy published a book, Administrative Process, which was used widely in many colleges. He also wrote Bragolections -- The career Adventures of a Poo-Bah—available at Johns Hopkins Library and a prized possession of many of his friends. Poo-Bah was a name given by his English teacher at Baltimore Polytechnic Institute.

Roy died in Towson, Maryland in 2000, at the age of 93.
