= HMS Rob Roy =

Destroyer of the Royal Navy

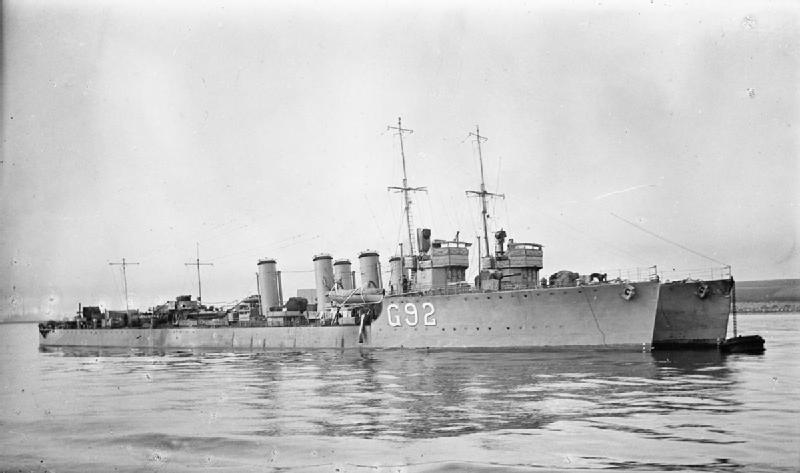
- HMS Rob Roy moored next to another R-class destroyer

History

United Kingdom
- Name: HMS Rob Roy
- Builder: Denny, Dumbarton
- Laid down: 15 October 1915
- Launched: 29 August 1916
- Completed: 15 December 1916
- Fate: Sold 13 July 1926

General characteristics
- Class & type: R-class destroyer
- Displacement: 975 long tons (991 t)
- Length: 276 ft (84.1 m)
- Beam: 26 ft 6 in (8.08 m)
- Draught: 9 ft 2 in (2.79 m)
- Propulsion: 3 boilers; 2 geared Brown Curtis steam turbines, 27,000 shp (20,000 kW)
- Speed: 36 knots (41.4 mph; 66.7 km/h)
- Range: 3,440 nmi (6,370 km) at 15 kn (28 km/h)
- Complement: 82
- Armament: 3 × QF 4-inch (101.6 mm) Mark IV guns; 1 × single 2-pounder (40-mm) "pom-pom" Mk. II anti-aircraft gun; 4 × 21 in (533 mm) torpedo tubes (2×2)

HMS Rob Roy was a Royal Navy R-class destroyer constructed and then operational in the First World War. The ship served in the Grand Fleet as part of the Fifteenth Destroyer Flotilla.

== Construction ==
Rob Roy was one of two Admiralty R-class destroyers ordered from the Scottish shipbuilder William Denny and Brothers by the British Admiralty in July 1915 as part of the Sixth War Construction Programme. (Note: In total, 17 standard Admiralty R-class destroyers were ordered together with three 'specials' built to Thornycroft's own design and four to Yarrow's design.) The ship was laid down at Denny's Dumbarton shipyard as yard number 1056 on 15 October 1915 and was launched on 29 August 1916. She was completed on 15 December 1916.

Starfish was 276 feet (84.12 m) long overall, with a beam of 26 feet 6 inches (8.08 m) and a draught of 9 feet (2.74 m). Displacement was 975 long tons (991 t) normal and 1,075 long tons (1,092 t) deep load. Three Yarrow boilers fed steam to two sets of Brown-Curtis geared steam turbines rated at 27,000 shaft horsepower (20,000 kW) and driving two shafts, giving a design speed of 36 knots (67 km/h; 41 mph). Three funnels were fitted. 296 tons of oil were carried, giving a design range of 3,450 nautical miles (6,390 km; 3,970 mi) at 15 knots (28 km/h; 17 mph). Armament consisted of three QF 4in Mk IV guns on the ship's centreline, with one on the forecastle, one aft on a raised bandstand and one between the second and third funnels. There was a single 2-pounder (40 mm) pom-pom anti-aircraft gun, while torpedo armament consisted of four 21 inch (533 mm) torpedoes in two twin mounts. The ship had a complement of 82 officers and men.

== Service ==
On commissioning, Rob Roy joined the Fifteenth Destroyer Flotilla of the Grand Fleet. On 18 January 1917 Rob Roy was one of six destroyers that were sent with the destroyer leader Grenville to temporarily reinforce the Harwich Force. On the night of 23/24 January 1917, the Harwich Force was ordered to intercept a German destroyer flotilla that was being transferred from Germany to Zeebrugge. Commodore Reginald Tyrwhitt, commander of the Harwich Force, split his forces into several groups to increase his chances of intercepting the German force. Rob Roy was part of a group of destroyers patrolling off the River Maas, with two more groups of destroyers off the Schouwen Bank while two groups of cruisers waited between the Hinder and the Maas. The German force ran into one of the cruiser divisions, with the destroyers V69 and G41 heavily damaged, but the Germans managed to break contact. Several of the British destroyers, including Rob Roy's group, left their patrol positions on hearing the noise of the engagement with the hope of joining in, allowing the German ships to slip through. One German straggler, SMS S50, encountered a British destroyer patrol and sank the destroyer Simoom before escaping.

On 14 February Rob Roy, which had returned to the Grand Fleet, was ordered to patrol between Peterhead and Aberdeen as a result of attacks on shipping by the German submarine UC-44, but UC-44 returned to base unhindered. From 15 June 1917 the destroyers and submarines of the Grand Fleet took part in Operation BB, a large scale operation against German submarines, with 53 destroyers and leaders together with 17 submarines deployed on offensive patrols on the transit route for the Germans from the North Sea and around the Orkney and Shetland Islands to the Western Approaches. The Fifteenth Destroyer Flotilla, including Rob Roy, was assigned to patrol in an area to the east of Shetland and Fair Isle. Rob Roy sighted a submarine on 21 June, and on 24 June, after the destroyer Rowena sighted a surfaced submarine, Rob Roy, together with Rowena and Trenchant, carried out an unsuccessful hunt for the submarine. Overall, 61 sightings were made of German submarines until the operation ended on 24 June, of which 12 resulted in attacks on the submarines, but no submarines were sunk or damaged.

In August 1917 Rob Roy, along with sister ships Restless, Tirade and Trenchant, was detached to the Northern Division of the Coast of Ireland Station, based at Buncrana. She was employed on convoy escort duties, and on 6 August was part of the escort for the homeward-bound Convoy HH.11 when the merchant ship Argalia was torpedoed and sunk by the German submarine U-94. East-bound convoys were led across the Atlantic by an ocean escort, a cruiser or armed merchantman, rendezvousing with an escort of destroyers and sloops for passage through the dangerous Western approaches. On 11 August Rob Roy left Buncrana as part of a force of eight sloops and destroyers, meeting up with Convoy HH.13 on 14 August and escorting the convoy without loss until it dispersed. She returned to the Fifteenth Flotilla from her detachment in October 1917.

Rob Roy remained part of the Fifteenth Destroyer Flotilla at the end of the First World War on 11 November 1918.

She was sold for scrap on 13 July 1926.

== See also ==
- Rob Roy

== Bibliography ==
- Dittmar, F.J.; Colledge, J.J. (1972). British Warships 1914–1919. Shepperton, UK: Ian Allan. ISBN 0-7110-0380-7.
- Friedman, Norman (2009). British Destroyers: From Earliest Days to the First World War. Barnsley, UK: Seaforth Publishing. ISBN 978-1-84832-049-9.
- Gardiner, Robert; Gray, Randal, eds. (1985). Conway's All the World's Fighting Ships 1906–1921. London: Conway Maritime Press. ISBN 0-85177-245-5.
- Karau, Mark K. (2014). The Naval Flank of the Western Front: The German MarineKorps Flandern 1914–1918. Barnsley, UK: Seaforth Publishing. ISBN 978-1-84832-231-8.
- Monograph No. 34: Home Waters—Part VIII: December 1916 to April 1917 (PDF). Naval Staff Monographs (Historical). Vol. XVIII. The Naval Staff, Training and Staff Duties Division. 1933.
- Monograph No. 35: Home Waters—Part IX: May, 1917–July, 1917 (PDF). Naval Staff Monographs (Historical). Vol. XIX. The Naval Staff, Training and Staff Duties Division. 1939.
- Newbolt, Henry (1928). History of the Great War: Naval Operations: Vol. IV. London: Longmans Green. OCLC 220475138.
