= HMS Rowena =

Destroyer of the Royal Navy

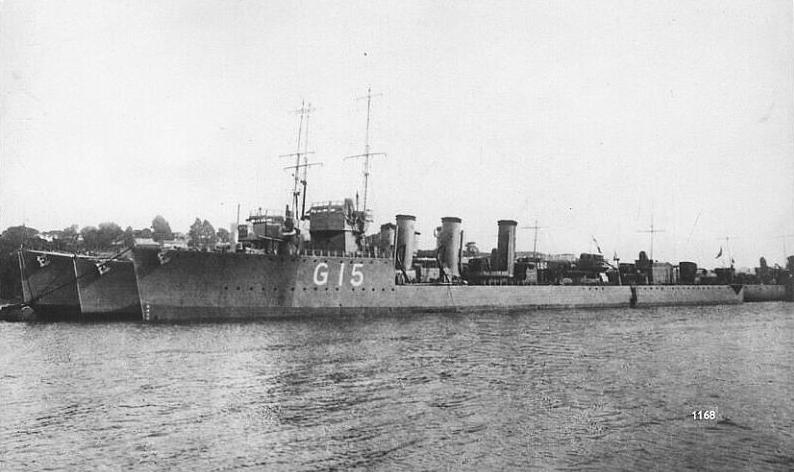
- Sistership HMS Romola and two other R-class destroyers

History

United Kingdom
- Name: HMS Rowena
- Builder: John Brown & Company, Clydebank
- Yard number: 450
- Laid down: 25 August 1915
- Launched: 1 July 1916
- Commissioned: 29 September 1916
- Decommissioned: 27 January 1937
- Fate: Broken up

General characteristics
- Class & type: R-class destroyer
- Displacement: 975 long tons (991 t) normal; 1,173 long tons (1,192 t) deep load
- Length: 265 ft (80.8 m) p.p.
- Beam: 26 ft 9 in (8.15 m)
- Draught: 9 ft 10 in (3.00 m)
- Propulsion: 3 Yarrow boilers; 2 geared Brown-Curtis steam turbines, 27,000 shp (20,000 kW)
- Speed: 36 knots (41.4 mph; 66.7 km/h)
- Range: 3,440 nmi (6,370 km) at 15 kn (28 km/h)
- Complement: 82
- Armament: 3 × QF 4-inch (101.6 mm) Mark IV guns, mounting P Mk. IX; 1 × single 2-pounder (40-mm) "pom-pom" Mk. II anti-aircraft gun; 4 × 21 in (533 mm) torpedo tubes (2×2)

HMS Rowena was an R-class destroyer which served with the Royal Navy during World War I. Launched on 1 July 1916, the ship operated as part of the Grand Fleet as part of a destroyer flotilla hunting for German vessels that were attacking convoys in the North Sea. Although there were many reported sightings, no submarines were sunk. After the conflict, the vessel was transferred to the Navy’s establishment at Portland to help in the development of anti-submarine warfare, which ultimately helped in the Battle of the Atlantic. Rowena did not, however, see the fruit of this labour. After twenty years of service, the destroyer was retired and sold to be broken up on 27 January 1937.

== Design and development ==
Rowena was the second R-class destroyer ordered by the British Admiralty in July 1915 as part of the Sixth War Construction Programme. A development of the preceding M-class, the design differed primarily in utilising geared turbines to improve fuel consumption.

The destroyer was 265 feet (80.77 m) long between perpendiculars, with a beam of 26 feet 9 inches (8.15 m) and a draught of 9 feet 10 inches (3.00 m). Displacement was 975 long tons (991 t) normal and 1,173 long tons (1,192 t) deep load. Power was provided by three Yarrow boilers feeding two Brown-Curtis geared steam turbines rated at 27,000 shaft horsepower (20,000 kW) and driving two shafts, to give a design speed of 36 knots (67 km/h; 41 mph). Three funnels were fitted. A total of 296 long tons (301 t) of fuel oil was carried, giving a design range of 3,450 nautical miles (6,390 km; 3,970 mi) at 15 knots (28 km/h; 17 mph).

Armament consisted of three 4 in (100 mm) Mk IV QF guns on the ship's centreline, with one on the forecastle, one aft on a raised platform and one between the second and third funnels. A single 2-pounder (40 mm) pom-pom anti-aircraft gun was carried, while torpedo armament consisted of two twin rotating mounts for 21 in (533 mm) torpedoes. The ship had a complement of 82 officers and ratings.

== Construction and career ==
Rowena was laid down by John Brown & Company at Clydebank on the River Clyde on 25 August 1915 and launched on 1 July 1916, leaving the yard on 29 September that year. The destroyer was allocated the yard number 450. The build took 310 days and fitting out 90 days.

On commissioning, Rowena joined the 15th Destroyer Flotilla of the Grand Fleet, and served there until 1919. The Flotilla was involved in supporting the convoys that crossed the North Sea, including running anti-submarine patrols between 15 and 24 June 1917. Although sixty-one sightings of submarines and twelve attacks were reported during that operation, no submarines were sunk. On 24 April 1918 the Flotilla was called to intercept the High Seas Fleet on what was to prove the last major expedition of the war by the German Navy. The ships returned without making contact.

In May 1919, the Rowena sailed from Ostend to the Admiralty Pier in Dover, to repatriate the remains of Edith Cavell - the British nurse executed by the German Army in 1915.

After the war, Rowena was sent to Gibraltar with her sister ship Romola, arriving on 8 May 1920. The vessel joined the Anti-Submarine Flotilla in Portland on 1 July 1926. For the next ten years, Rowena was used to refine anti-submarine weapons and techniques such as ASDIC. ASDIC went on to prove invaluable in the Battle of the Atlantic. On 27 January 1937, the destroyer was given to Thos. W. Ward of Sheffield in exchange for RMS Majestic, and was subsequently broken up at Milford Haven.

== Pennant numbers ==
Pennant number	Date
G81	January 1917
G90	January 1918
F45	November 1919
D84	
H85	
