= 15th Destroyer Flotilla =

- Active: (1916–1919), (1939–1945)
- Country: United Kingdom
- Branch: Royal Navy
- Size: Flotilla

Commanders
- First: Captain Arthur B. S. Dutton

The 15th Destroyer Flotilla, or Fifteenth Destroyer Flotilla, was a naval formation of the British Royal Navy from August 1916 to March 1919 and again from September 1939 to May 1945.

== First World War ==
The flotilla was first established in August 1916 and was attached to the Grand Fleet till March 1918. It was then transferred to the Battle Cruiser Force until it was disbanded in March 1919.

== Second World War ==
At the outset of the war the flotilla was reformed under the Commander-in-Chief, Rosyth from September to October 1939. It was then transferred to the Western Approaches Command at Plymouth until January 1941. Reassigned once again to Commander-in-Chief, Plymouth where it remained until May 1945 before it was dispersed.

== Table of assignments ==
| Assigned to | Dates | Notes |
|---|---|---|
| Grand Fleet | April 1916 to March 1918 | |
| Battle Cruiser Force | March 1918 to March 1919 | disbanded |
| Rosyth Command | September to October 1939 | reformed |
| Western Approaches Command | October 1939 to January 1941 | at Plymouth |
| Plymouth Command | January 1941 to May 1945 | disbanded |

== Captains (D) 15th Destroyer Flotilla ==
Incomplete list of post holders included:

| | Rank | Name | Term | Notes |
|---|---|---|---|---|
Captain (D) afloat 15th Destroyer Flotilla
| 1 | Captain | Arthur B. S. Dutton | 28 August 1916 – November, 1917 | later V.Adm. |
| 2 | Captain | Rafe G. Rowley-Conwy | November, 1917 – 1 March 1919 | later R.Adm. |
| 3 | Captain | Ralph Kerr | 31 July 1939 – 18 January 1941 | |

== Sources ==
- Anderson, Roger Charles; Carr Laughton, Leonard George; Perrin, William Gordon (2000). "15th Destroyer Flotilla which was part of Western Approaches Command". The Mariner's Mirror. Society for Nautical Research. 86: 321.
- Evans, A.S. (2010). Destroyer down : an account of HM destroyer losses, 1939–1945 (1. publ. ed.). Barnsley: Pen & Sword Maritime. ISBN 9781848842700.
- Harley, Simon; Lovell, Tony. (2018) "Fifteenth (Royal Navy) – The Dreadnought Project". www.dreadnoughtproject.org. Harley and Lovell, 29 May 2018. Retrieved 9 July 2018.
- Hawkins, Ian (2003). Destroyer: An Anthology of First-hand Accounts of the War at Sea, 1939–1945. London, England: Conway Maritime Press. ISBN 9780851779478.
- Watson, Dr Graham. (2015) "Royal Navy Organisation and Ship Deployment, World War One 1914–1918". www.naval-history.net. Gordon Smith.
- Watson, Dr Graham. (2015) "Royal Navy Organisation in World War 2, 1939–1945". www.naval-history.net. Gordon Smith.
