= HMS Patriot (1916) =

Destroyer of the Royal Navy

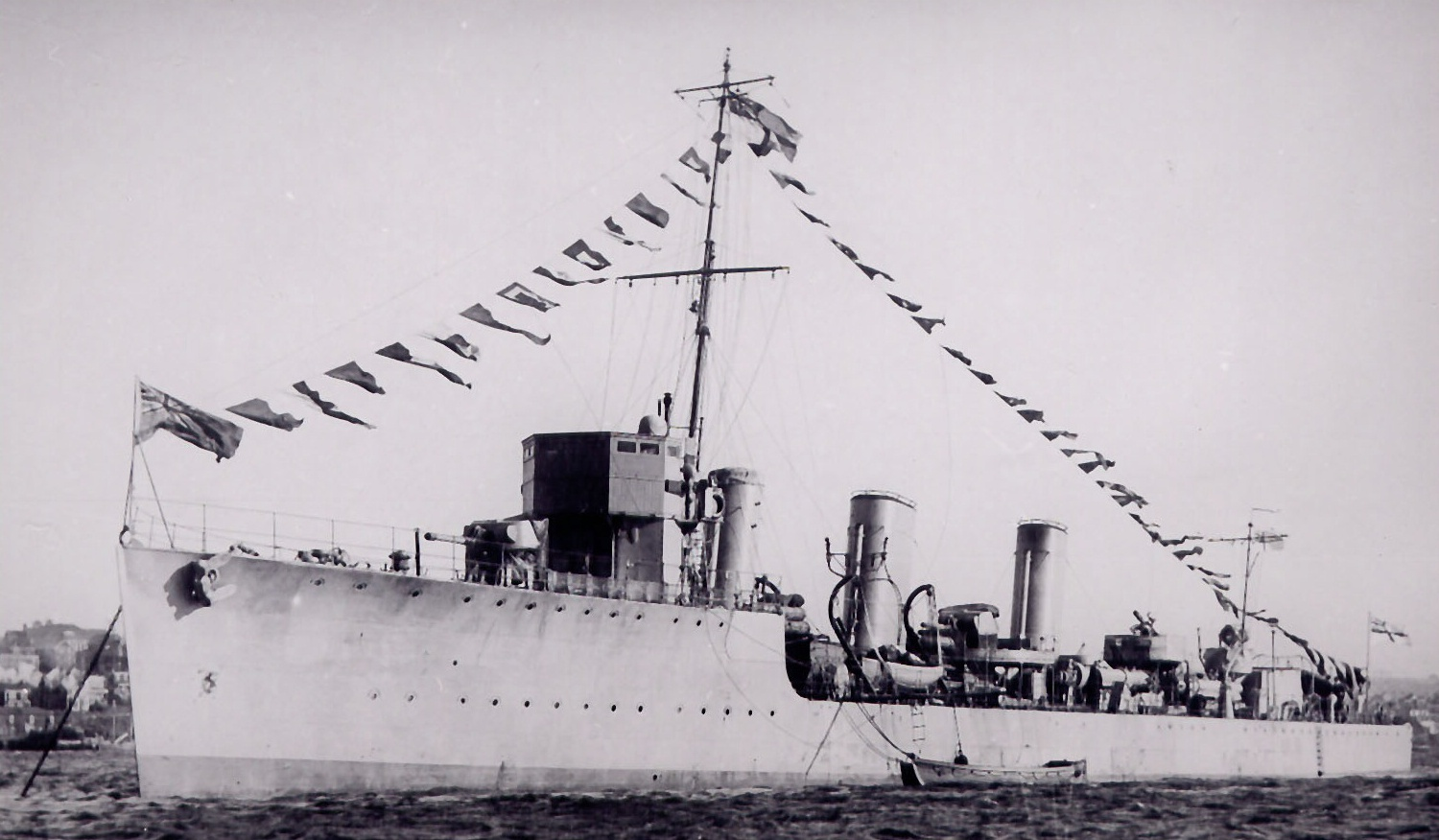
- Patriot circa. 1922

History

United Kingdom
- Name: Patriot
- Builder: Thornycroft & Company, Southampton
- Laid down: July 1915
- Launched: 20 April 1916
- Commissioned: June 1916
- Fate: Transferred to Canada in September 1920

Canada
- Name: Patriot
- Acquired: September 1920
- Commissioned: 1 November 1920
- Decommissioned: December 1927
- Fate: Sold for scrap in 1929

General characteristics
- Class & type: Thornycroft M-class destroyer
- Displacement: 985 long tons (1,001 t)
- Length: 274 ft (84 m) o/a
- Beam: 27 ft 3 in (8.31 m)
- Draught: 10 ft 6 in (3.20 m)
- Propulsion: Brown-Curtis steam turbines; 26,500 shp (19,800 kW); 3 shafts
- Speed: 35 knots (65 km/h; 40 mph)
- Range: 254 long tons (258 t) oil
- Complement: 80
- Armament: 3 × QF 4 in (102 mm) Mark IV guns, mounting P Mk.IX; 1 × single QF 2-pounder "pom-pom" Mk.II; 2 × twin 21 in (533 mm) torpedo tubes

HMS Patriot was a Thornycroft M-class destroyer that served in the British Royal Navy. The destroyer entered service in 1915 during the First World War and saw service with the Grand Fleet. Following the war, the destroyer was declared surplus and in 1920, the ship was transferred to the Royal Canadian Navy. Recommissioned as HMCS Patriot, the destroyer was used primarily as a training ship. Patriot was taken out of service in 1927, sold for scrap in 1929 and broken up.

== Design and description ==
Patriot was a Thornycroft M-class destroyer that displaced 985 long tons (1,001 t) and was 274 feet (84 m) long overall with a beam of 27 feet 3 inches (8.31 m) and a draught of 10 feet 6 inches (3.20 m). The ship was propelled by three shafts driven by Brown-Curtis turbines powered by three Yarrow boilers creating 26,500 shaft horsepower (19,800 kW). This gave the ship a maximum speed of 35 knots (65 km/h; 40 mph). The destroyer carried 254 long tons (258 t) of fuel oil.

The destroyer was armed with three quick-firing (QF) 4-inch (102 mm)/45 calibre Mark IV guns in single mounts. The No.2 4-inch gun was placed on a bandstand, unlike earlier M-class destroyers. For secondary armament, the destroyer was equipped with a single QF 2-pounder "pom-pom" Mk.II and four 21-inch (533 mm) torpedo tubes in two twin mounts. As a Thornycroft "special", Patriot resembled the standard Admiralty version of the class with the exception of her flat-sided funnels and higher freeboard.

== Service history ==
=== Royal Navy ===
Patriot was one of two Thornycroft M-class destroyers ordered in February 1915 as part of the Fourth War Construction Programme, along with 15 of the standard Admiralty design. She was laid down at Thornycroft & Company's Southampton shipyard in July 1915. The ship was launched on 20 April 1916 and completed in June 1916.

Patriot saw extensive service for the remainder of the First World War. On commissioning, Patriot joined the recently formed 14th Destroyer Flotilla, part of the Grand Fleet. In early July 1917, Patriot took part with another five destroyers (the leader Anzac, together with Norman, Maenad, Morning Star and Moon) in a mission against German submarines transiting the North Sea. The other five destroyers carried Kite balloons to aid the spotting and tracking of enemy submarines. The patrol made several sightings of a submarine, but did not manage to bring it to action before a shortage of hydrogen for the balloons on 8 July forced the flotilla to return to Scapa Flow. On 11 July, Patriot set out as part of another sweep by kite balloon equipped destroyers against German submarines. On 12 July, the observer aboard Patriot's balloon spotted a submarine on the surface. When the submarine submerged as Patriot approached and engaged with gunfire, the balloon directed Patriot in a depth charge attack against the submarine, which resulted in a small amount of oil coming to the surface, followed about an hour later by an apparent underwater explosion and a large slick of oil, which was believed to mark the sinking of the German submarine U-69. (Note: U-69 set out on patrol from Emden on 9 July and did not return, with the final radio contact on 11 July. The official history of U-boat operations suggests that U-69 was attacking shipping in the Irish Sea until at least 23 July.) In October 1917, Patriot formed part of a large-scale operation, involving 30 cruisers and 54 destroyers deployed in eight groups across the North Sea in an attempt to stop a suspected sortie by German naval forces. Despite these countermeasures, the two German light cruisers Bremse and Brummer, managed to evade the patrols and attacked the regular convoy between Norway and Britain, sinking nine merchant ships and two destroyers, Mary Rose and Strongbow before returning safely to Germany.

She maintained continuous operations both as a convoy escort, and in harbour protection. Patriot remained part of the 14th Destroyer Flotilla at the end of the war. Following the end of the war, the Grand Fleet was abolished, forming the Atlantic Fleet, with more modern destroyers (mainly the V and W classes and the S class) supporting the fleet, while older destroyers went to subsidiary tasks or were laid up. Patriot was sent to the Firth of Forth, joining the Local Defence Flotilla. By November 1919, she was laid up in reserve at HMNB Portsmouth.

=== Royal Canadian Navy ===
In March 1920, the Canadian government accepted the British offer of a cruiser and two destroyers. The three ships were offered by the Royal Navy to replace the aged cruisers Rainbow and Niobe. Patriot, along with her sister Patrician were chosen for transfer in September 1920, needing some modernization which included enclosing the bridge. Patriot, Patrician and the cruiser Aurora were commissioned into the Royal Canadian Navy on 1 November 1920 at Devonport and departed for Halifax, Nova Scotia one month later.

Patriot saw immediate service patrolling the waters off Canada's Atlantic coast. The destroyer performed training duties and patrols for the next five years while based out of Halifax. On 10 May 1921, Patriot went aground, for which the commanding officer and navigation officer were later court martialled. Aurora, Patrician and Patriot performed a training cruise to the West Indies in spring/summer 1921. During a visit to Puntarenas, Costa Rica, the Canadian vessels supported negotiations by the Royal Bank of Canada in a dispute over oil with the Costa Rican government. In September 1921, Patriot assisted Alexander Graham Bell's hydrofoil research by towing his high speed experimental hydrofoil HD-4. This experiment was conducted on the waters of Baddeck Bay in the Bras d'Or Lake estuary near the village of Baddeck, Nova Scotia.

Patriot remained as the only major warship of the Royal Canadian Navy in Halifax following budget cuts in 1922. She was used to train the newly formed Royal Canadian Naval Volunteer Reserve. Roughly once a year, Patriot sailed to the West Indies to take part in naval exercises with the Royal Navy. By 1927, the Royal Canadian Navy began looking for replacements for Patriot and Patrician. By the end of the year, the Canadian government had purchased two new destroyers from the United Kingdom. Patriot was paid off in December 1927 and sold for scrap and broken up at Briton Ferry, Wales in 1929.

== Commanding officers ==
=== With Royal Canadian Navy ===
- LT C.T. Beard (RCN) 1/11/1920 – 2/9/1922
- LT George C. Jones (RCN) 3/9/1922 – 23/8/1923 (Note: A future Chief of Naval Staff, and the first graduate of the Royal Naval College of Canada to command a ship in the Royal Canadian Navy)
- LT H.E. Reid (RCN) 24/8/1923 – 6/10/1926
- LT C.R.H. Taylor (RCN) 7/10/1925 – 4/4/1926
- LCDR C.R.H. Taylor (RCN) 5/4/1926 – 23/10/1927
