= HMS Sabrina (1916) =

British Yarrow Later M-Class destroyer

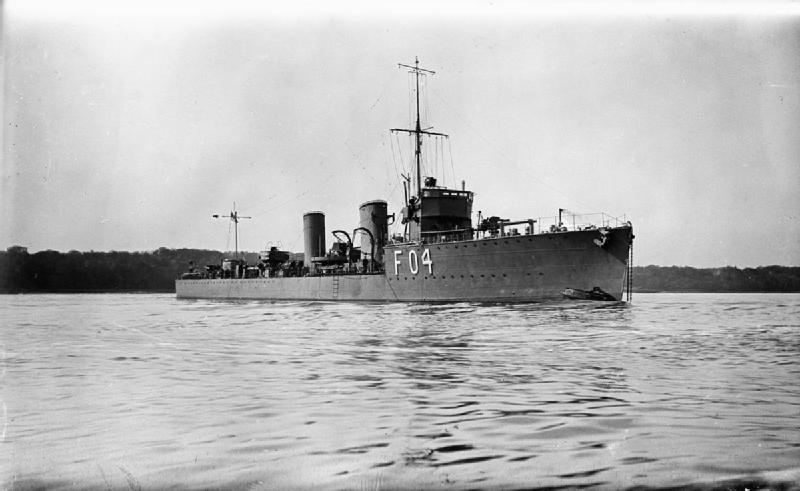
- The related Nerissa

History

United Kingdom
- Name: Sabrina
- Ordered: July 1915
- Builder: Yarrow Shipbuilders, Glasgow
- Laid down: November 1915
- Launched: 24 July 1916
- Completed: September 1916
- Out of service: 5 November 1926
- Fate: Sold to be broken up

General characteristics
- Class & type: Yarrow Later M-class destroyer
- Displacement: 930 long tons (940 t) (normal)
- Length: 273 ft 6 in (83.4 m) (o/a)
- Beam: 25 ft 7.5 in (7.8 m)
- Draught: 9 ft (2.7 m)
- Installed power: 3 Yarrow boilers, 27,000 shp (20,000 kW)
- Propulsion: Parsons steam turbines, 2 shafts
- Speed: 36 knots (67 km/h; 41 mph)
- Range: 1,860 nmi (3,440 km; 2,140 mi) at 20 kn (37 km/h; 23 mph)
- Complement: 82
- Armament: 3 × single QF 4-inch (102 mm) guns; 1 × single 2-pdr 40 mm (1.6 in) "pom-pom" AA gun; 2 × twin 21 in (533 mm) torpedo tubes

HMS Sabrina was the first Yarrow Later M class, or Yarrow R class, destroyer and served in the Royal Navy during the First World War. The Later M class was an improvement on those of the preceding Yarrow M class, with a narrower beam. Launched in 1916, Sabrina joined the Fifteenth Destroyer Flotilla of the Grand Fleet. The vessel was a participant in anti-submarine patrols as part of the flotilla, but did not engage any enemy warships. The Admiralty increasingly used more successful convoys rather than relying on destroyers finding the enemy on patrol. After the Armistice that ended the war, the destroyer was initially placed in reserve and participated in a naval exercise in 1920, before being sold to be broken up in 1926.

== Design and development ==
As the First World War progressed, the Royal Navy required more, and more modern, warships. In July 1915, within the Sixth War Programme, the British Admiralty ordered four vessels from Yarrow Shipbuilders as part of a wider order of R-class destroyers. The R class was generally similar to the preceding M class, but differed, primarily, in having geared steam turbines. The Yarrow-built ships differed in retaining the direct drive turbines of the M class and are therefore often called the Yarrow Later M class. They were similar to the preceding Yarrow M class but distinguished by their greater tonnage, narrower beam and sloping sterns. Sabrina was the lead ship of the Yarrow Later M class, which was also known as the Sabrina group.

The destroyer had a length of 273 ft 6 in (83.4 m) overall, with a beam of 25 ft 7.5 in (7.8 m) and draught of 9 ft (2.7 m). Displacement was 930 long tons (940 t) normal. Power was provided by three Yarrow boilers feeding Parsons direct-drive steam turbines rated at 27,000 shaft horsepower (20,000 kW). The turbines drove two shafts and exhausted through two funnels. Design speed was 36 knots (67 km/h; 41 mph). In trials, the destroyer achieved 36.97 kn (68.47 km/h; 42.54 mph) at a displacement of 786 long tons (799 t). Between 215 and 260 long tons (218 and 264 t) of oil was carried. Design range was 1,860 nautical miles (3,440 km; 2,140 mi) at 20 knots (37 km/h; 23 mph). The ship had a complement of 82 officers and ratings.

Sabrina had a main armament consisting of three single QF 4-inch (102 mm) Mk IV guns on the centreline, with one on the forecastle, one aft and one between the middle and aft funnels. One single 2-pdr 40 mm (1.6 in) "pom-pom" anti-aircraft gun was carried. Torpedo armament consisted of two twin torpedo tubes for 21 in (533 mm) torpedoes located aft of the funnels. The destroyer was also fitted with racks and storage for depth charges. Initially, only two depth charges were carried but the number increased in service and by 1918, the vessel was carrying between 30 and 50 depth charges.

== Construction and career ==
Sabrina was laid down by Yarrow at their shipyard in Scotstoun, Glasgow, in November 1915, launched on 24 July 1916 and completed during September the same year. The ship was the fifth of the name in service with the Royal Navy. The vessel was deployed as part of the Grand Fleet, joining the Fifteenth Destroyer Flotilla. On 22 November, the flotilla took part in exercises north of the Shetland Islands under the dreadnought Iron Duke that also involved the majority of the First and Third Battle Squadrons.

Between 15 and 24 June 1917, the flotilla took part in anti-submarine patrols east of the Shetland Islands. Sabrina claimed to have spotted a submarine on the surface on 24 June but was unable to mount a successful attack. More successful was the use of convoys. After a convoy of 13 ships had been attacked by the German submarine U-19, Sabrina, along with fellow-destroyer Trenchant, managed to corral the dispersed ships, which then avoided any more losses. Overall, out of the 117 ships that sailed the route to and from Scandinavia during the operation, only four were sunk. The Admiralty increasingly redeployed the destroyers of the Grand Fleet to escorting. Nonetheless, on 15 October, Sabrina formed part of a large-scale operation, involving 30 cruisers and 54 destroyers deployed in eight groups across the North Sea in an attempt to stop a suspected sortie by German naval forces. Despite these measures, the German light cruisers Bremse and Brummer managed to attack the regular convoy between Norway and Britain two days later, sinking two destroyers, Mary Rose and Strongbow, and nine merchant ships before returning safely to Germany.

After the Armistice of 11 November 1918 that ended the war, the Royal Navy returned to a peacetime level of strength and both the number of ships and the amount of personnel in service needed to be reduced to save money. Sabrina' was placed in reserve at the Nore. On 5 July 1920, the vessel participated in a exercise for the reserve led by the flotilla leader Abdiel. In July 1923, the Navy decided to scrap many of the older destroyers in preparation for the introduction of newer and larger vessels. On 22 September 1925, Sabrina was one of 22 destroyers that were chosen to be scrapped. On 5 November 1926, the warship was retired and sold to Cashmore to be broken up at Newport.

== Pennant numbers ==
Pennant number	Date
G79	January 1917
G92	January 1918
F15	January 1919
H47	January 1922
