= HMS Sceptre (1917) =

R-class destroyer of the Royal Navy

History

United Kingdom
- Name: HMS Sceptre
- Builder: Alexander Stephen and Sons
- Yard number: 478
- Laid down: 10 November 1915
- Launched: 18 April 1917
- Completed: 26 May 1917
- Fate: Sold for scrapping 16 December 1926

General characteristics
- Class & type: R-class destroyer
- Displacement: 1,072 long tons (1,089 t) normal
- Length: 276 ft 1 in (84.15 m)
- Beam: 26 ft 9 in (8.15 m)
- Draught: 13 ft 5 1/2 in (4.102 m)
- Propulsion: 3 boilers; 2 geared Brown Curtis steam turbines; 27,000 shp (20,000 kW)
- Speed: 36 knots (41.4 mph; 66.7 km/h)
- Range: 3,450 nmi (6,390 km) at 15 kn (28 km/h)
- Complement: 82
- Armament: 3 × QF 4-inch (101.6 mm) Mark IV guns; 1 × single 2-pounder (40-mm) "pom-pom" Mk. II anti-aircraft gun; 4 × 21 in (533 mm) torpedo tubes (2×2)

HMS Sceptre was an R-class destroyer of the Royal Navy, built by Alexander Stephen and Sons, at Linthouse (in Glasgow) and launched on 18 April 1917. In total 51 ships were in this class and saw service in World War I, entering service from 1916 to 1917 and suffering comparatively light losses. Sceptre saw action as part of the Harwich Force, operating mainly in the North Sea. She survived the war and was sold for disposal in 1926.

== Design and construction ==
The R-class was a further development of the M-class destroyer, which had been the last class of destroyers ordered for the Royal Navy before the start of the First World War, and had therefore been built in large numbers during the early years of the war. The R-class differed by having geared rather than direct drive steam turbines, giving greater fuel efficiency while also carrying more fuel, having a higher forecastle for better seakeeping and a larger and more robust bridge structure.

The standard Admiralty R-class ships were 276 feet 1 inch (84.15 m) long overall and 265 feet 0 inches (80.77 m) between perpendiculars, with a beam of 26 feet 9 inches (8.15 m) and a draught of 13 feet 5 1/2 inches (4.102 m). Displacement was 1,072 long tons (1,089 t) normal and 1,220 long tons (1,240 t) deep load. Three Yarrow water-tube boilers fed steam to Brown-Curtis geared steam turbines which drove two propeller shafts. The machinery was rated at 27,000 shaft horsepower (20,000 kW) giving a speed of 36 knots (41 mph; 67 km/h). Up to 296 tons of oil fuel were carried, giving a design range of 3,450 nmi (3,970 mi; 6,390 km) at 15 kn (17 mph; 28 km/h).

The ships were armed with three 4-inch (102 mm) QF Mk IV guns, together with one 2-pounder pom-pom anti-aircraft autocannon. Two twin 21-inch (533mm) torpedo tubes were fitted. The ships had a crew of 82.

Sceptre was one of two Admiralty R-class destroyers ordered from the Scottish shipbuilder Alexander Stephen and Sons by the British Admiralty in May–July 1915 as part of the Sixth War Construction Programme. (Note: In total, 17 standard Admiralty R-class destroyers were ordered together with three 'specials' built to Thornycroft's own design and four to Yarrow's design.) Sceptre was laid down at Stephen's Linthouse, Glasgow shipyard as yard number 478 on 10 November 1915. She was launched on 18 April 1917 and completed on 26 May 1917.

== Service ==
On commissioning, Sceptre joined the 10th Destroyer Flotilla, attached to the Harwich Force. In October 1917, Sceptre formed part of a large-scale operation, involving 30 cruisers and 54 destroyers deployed in eight groups across the North Sea in an attempt to stop a suspected sortie by German naval forces in the North Sea. Despite these countermeasures, the two German light cruisers Bremse and Brummer, managed to evade the patrols, which were deployed expecting German action further to the south and attacked the regular convoy between Norway and Britain, sinking nine merchant ships and two destroyers, Mary Rose and Strongbow before returning safely to Germany. On 4 October 1918, Sceptre, along with the destroyers Montrose, Starfish, and Sylph, sank the German armed vessels Bremerhaven and Ober Burgermeister Adickes. Sceptre remained part of the 10th Destroyer Flotilla at the end of the war.

Sceptre was still part of the 10th Flotilla in February 1919, but by March had transferred to the 5th Destroyer Flotilla. Sceptre's status changed to having only a reduced complement on 15 October 1919. In December 1919, Sceptre was listed as a part of the local defence flotilla at Devonport with a "Home Fleet complement". (Note: As opposed to being in full commission or having a "reserve complement" or a care and maintenance party.) Sceptre was sold to the shipbreaker Ward on 16 December 1926 for scrapping at their Briton Ferry yard.

== Pennant numbers ==
Pennant number	Dates
F79	1917–January 1918
F60	January 1918–

== Bibliography ==
- Dittmar, F.J.; Colledge, J.J. (1972). British Warships 1914–1919. Shepperton: Ian Allan. ISBN 978-0-7110-0380-4.
- Friedman, Norman (2009). British Destroyers: From Earliest Days to the Second World War. Barnsley, UK: Seaforth Publishing. ISBN 978-1-84832-049-9.
- Gardiner, Robert; Gray, Randal, eds. (1985). Conway's All The World's Fighting Ships 1906–1921. London: Conway Maritime Press. ISBN 0-85177-245-5.
- Halpern, Paul G. (1994). A Naval History of World War I. London: UCL Press. ISBN 1-85728-498-4.
- Manning, T. D. (1961). The British Destroyer. London: Putnam.
- Massie, Robert K. (2007). Castles of Steel: Britain, Germany and the Winning of the War at Sea. London: Vintage Books. ISBN 978-0-099-52378-9.
- Newbolt, Henry (1931). Naval Operations: Vol. V. History of the Great War. London: Longmans, Green & Co.
