= HMS Sibyl =

Seven ships of the Royal Navy have borne the name HMS Sibyl or HMS Sybille, named for the Greek mythological figures, the Sibyls (Greek: Σίβυλλα):

- HMS Sibyl (1779) was a 28-gun sixth rate launched in 1779. She was renamed HMS Garland in 1795 and was wrecked in 1798.
- HMS Sybille (1794) was a 44-gun fifth rate, previously the French frigate Sibylle. She was captured in 1794, reduced to harbour service in 1831 and was sold in 1833.
- HMS Sybille (1847) was a 36-gun fifth rate launched in 1847 and broken up in 1866.
- HMS Sybille (1890) was an Apollo-class cruiser launched in 1890 and wrecked in 1901.
- HMS Sybille (1917) was an M-class destroyer launched in 1913 and sold in 1926.
- HMS Sibyl (P217) was an S-class submarine launched in 1942 and broken up in 1948.
- HMS Sibyl was to have been a C-class destroyer. She was renamed HMS Cavendish before her launch in 1944.

== See also ==
- French ship Sibylle
