= HMS Truculent (1917) =

British Yarrow Later M-Class destroyer

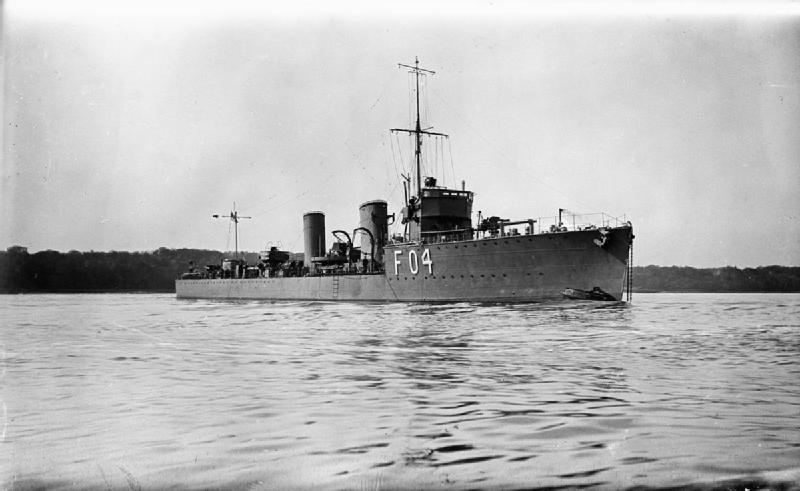
- The related Nerissa

History

United Kingdom
- Name: Truculent
- Ordered: March 1916
- Builder: Yarrow Shipbuilders, Glasgow
- Laid down: March 1916
- Launched: 24 March 1917
- Completed: May 1917
- Out of service: 29 April 1927
- Fate: Sold to be broken up

General characteristics
- Class & type: Yarrow Later M-class destroyer
- Displacement: 930 long tons (940 t) (normal)
- Length: 273 ft 6 in (83.4 m) (o/a)
- Beam: 25 ft 7.5 in (7.8 m)
- Draught: 9 ft (2.7 m)
- Installed power: 3 Yarrow boilers, 27,800 shp (20,700 kW)
- Propulsion: Parsons steam turbines, 2 shafts
- Speed: 36 knots (67 km/h; 41 mph)
- Range: 1,860 nmi (3,440 km; 2,140 mi) at 20 kn (37 km/h; 23 mph)
- Complement: 82
- Armament: 3 × single QF 4-inch (102 mm) guns; 1 × single 2-pdr 40 mm (1.6 in) "pom-pom" AA gun; 2 × twin 21 in (533 mm) torpedo tubes

HMS Truculent was the a Yarrow Later M-class destroyer, or Yarrow R-class destroyer that served in the Royal Navy during the First World War. The Later M class was an improvement on those of the preceding Yarrow M class, with a narrower beam. Launched in 1917, Truculent joined the Tenth Destroyer Flotilla of the Harwich Force. The flotilla escorted convoys across the North Sea. The destroyer also escorted the monitors Erebus and Terror in their bombardment of Ostend in 1917 and of Zeebrugge in 1918, both times without casualties. After the Armistice that ended the war, the destroyer was briefly sent to Hamburg in 1919 before being placed in reserve, eventually being sold to be broken up in 1927.

== Design and development ==
As the First World War progressed, the Royal Navy required more, and more modern, warships. In March 1916, within the Eighth War Programme, the British Admiralty ordered three vessels from Yarrow Shipbuilders as part of a wider order of R-class destroyers. The R class was generally similar to the preceding M class, but differed in, primarily, in having geared steam turbines. The Yarrow-built ships differed in retaining the direct drive turbines of the M class and are therefore often called the Yarrow Later M class. They were similar to the preceding Yarrow M class but distinguished by their greater tonnage, narrower beam and sloping sterns. Truculent was the first of the three to be launched.

Truculent had a length of 273 ft 6 in (83.4 m) overall, with a beam of 25 ft 7.5 in (7.8 m) and draught of 9 ft (2.7 m). Displacement was 930 long tons (940 t) normal. Power was provided by three Yarrow boilers feeding Parsons direct-drive steam turbines rated at 27,000 shaft horsepower (20,000 kW). The turbines drove two shafts and exhausted through two funnels. Design speed was 36 knots (67 km/h; 41 mph). In trials, the destroyer achieved 39,117 kn (72,445 km/h; 45,015 mph) at a displacement of 780 long tons (790 t). Between 215 and 260 long tons (218 and 264 t) of oil was carried. Design range was 1,860 nautical miles (3,440 km; 2,140 mi) at 20 knots (37 km/h; 23 mph). The ship had a complement of 82 officers and ratings.

Truculent had a main armament consisting of three single QF 4-inch (102 mm) Mk IV guns on the centreline, with one on the forecastle, one aft and one between the middle and aft funnels. Torpedo armament consisted of two twin torpedo tubes for 21 in (533 mm) torpedoes located aft of the funnels. A 2-pounder 40 mm (1.6 in) "pom-pom" anti-aircraft gun was carried. The destroyer was also fitted with racks and storage for depth charges. Initially, only two depth charges were carried but the number increased in service and by 1918, the vessel was carrying between 30 and 50 depth charges.

== Construction and career ==
Truculent was laid down by Yarrow at their shipyard in Scotstoun, Glasgow, in March 1916, launched on 24 March 1917 and completed in May that year. The ship was the first of the name in service with the navy. The vessel was deployed as part of the Harwich Force, joining the Tenth Destroyer Flotilla. The flotilla was involved in supporting the convoys that crossed the North Sea.

On 4 June 1917, the destroyer formed part of the escort for the monitors Erebus and Terror in their bombardment of Ostend. Out of the 115 shells fired, 20 hit the dockyard or nearby. This was to be the last such attack for many months. Between 16 and 17 October, the destroyer was called upon to be part of a large force of 84 warships sent out to search for a German fleet based around a minelayer, although Truculent saw no action. After an aborted attempt on 11 April 1918, the vessel escorted Erebus and Terror on an attack on Zeebrugge on 18 April. The plan included the sinking of blockships to impede the flow of German submarines leaving the port. Although the operation did not meet the expectations of the Admiralty and the port remained open, the bombardment was achieved without interference by enemy warships or the loss of any British vessels. On 1 October, as part of the Harwich Force, the ship was sent to intercept retreating German forces, but did not find any. This was one of the final voyages undertaken by the Harwich Force during the war.

On 2 February 1919, Truculent sailed into the Elbe and, on 4 February, arrived in Hamburg. The city was in a state of turmoil as food supplies were being held by the Hamburg Workers and Soldiers Council. The council was a radical element that had arisen partly in response to food shortages in the city. Election on 16 March brought some calm, but ultimately the lack of food led to riots in June that year, Meanwhile, as the Royal Navy returned to a peacetime level of strength following the Armistice of 11 November 1918 that ended the war, both the number of ships and the amount of personnel in service needed to be reduced to save money. On 10 May 1919 Truculent was placed in reserve at Portsmouth. In July 1923, the Navy decided to scrap many of the older destroyers in preparation for the introduction of newer and larger vessels. On 22 September 1925, Truculent was one of 22 destroyers that were chosen to be scrapped. On 29 April 1927, the warship was retired and sold to Cashmore to be broken up at Newport.

== Pennant numbers ==
Pennant number	Date
F70	January 1917
F82	January 1918
F12	January 1919
H45	January 1922
