= HMS Sybille (1917) =

British Yarrow Later M-Class destroyer

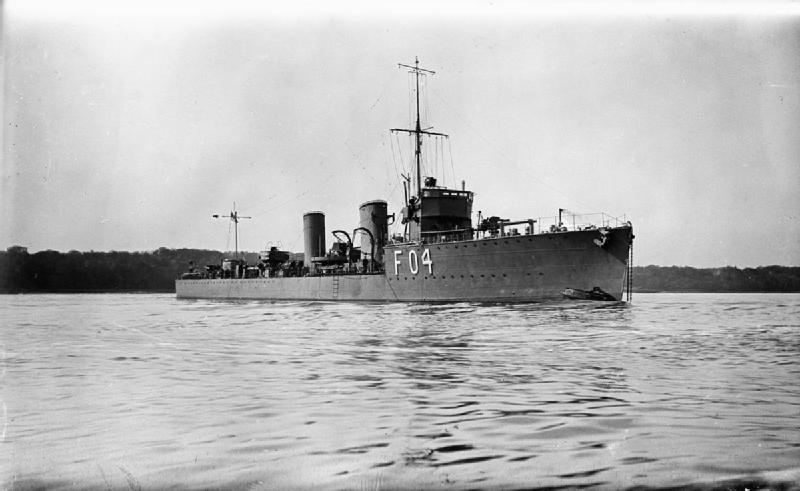
- The related Nerissa

History

United Kingdom
- Name: Sybille
- Namesake: Sibylle
- Ordered: July 1915
- Builder: Yarrow Shipbuilders, Glasgow
- Laid down: August 1915
- Launched: 5 February 1916
- Completed: February 1917
- Out of service: 5 November 1926
- Fate: Sold to be broken up

General characteristics
- Class & type: Yarrow Later M-class destroyer
- Displacement: 930 long tons (940 t) (normal)
- Length: 273 ft 6 in (83.4 m) (o/a)
- Beam: 25 ft 7.5 in (7.8 m)
- Draught: 9 ft (2.7 m)
- Installed power: 3 Yarrow boilers, 27,800 shp (20,700 kW)
- Propulsion: Parsons steam turbines, 2 shafts
- Speed: 36 knots (67 km/h; 41 mph)
- Range: 1,860 nmi (3,440 km; 2,140 mi) at 20 kn (37 km/h; 23 mph)
- Complement: 82
- Armament: 3 × single QF 4-inch (102 mm) guns; 1 × single 2-pdr 40 mm (1.6 in) "pom-pom" AA gun; 2 × twin 21 in (533 mm) torpedo tubes

HMS Sybille was a Yarrow Later M-class, or Yarrow R-class, destroyer that served in the Royal Navy during the First World War. The Later M class was an improvement on those of the preceding Yarrow M class, with a narrower beam. Launched in 1917, Sybille joined the Tenth Destroyer Flotilla of the Harwich Force. The flotilla was tasked with escorting convoys across the North Sea. The destroyer also escorted the monitors Erebus and Terror in their bombardment of Ostend in 1917 and took part in a sortie in 1917 led by the destroyer leader Montrose. After the Armistice that ended the war in 1918, the destroyer was placed in reserve. After participating in a naval review in 1924, Sybille was sold to be broken up in 1926.

== Design and development ==
As the First World War progressed, the Royal Navy required more, and more modern, warships. In July 1915, within the Sixth War Programme, the British Admiralty ordered four vessels from Yarrow Shipbuilders as part of a wider order of R-class destroyers. The R class was generally similar to the preceding M class, but differed in, primarily, in having geared steam turbines. The Yarrow-built ships differed in retaining the direct drive turbines of the M class and are therefore often called the Yarrow Later M-class. They were similar to the preceding Yarrow M class but distinguished by their greater tonnage, narrower beam and sloping sterns. Sybille was the last of the class to be launched.

Sybille had a length of 273 ft 6 in (83.4 m) overall, with a beam of 25 ft 7.5 in (7.8 m) and draught of 9 ft (2.7 m). Displacement was 930 long tons (940 t) normal. Power was provided by three Yarrow boilers feeding Parsons direct-drive steam turbines rated at 27,000 shaft horsepower (20,000 kW). The turbines drove two shafts and exhausted through two funnels. Design speed was 36 knots (67 km/h; 41 mph). In trials, the destroyer achieved 39,117 kn (72,445 km/h; 45,015 mph) at a displacement of 780 long tons (790 t).} Between 215 and 260 long tons (218 and 264 t) of oil was carried. Design range was 1,860 nautical miles (3,440 km; 2,140 mi) at 20 knots (37 km/h; 23 mph). The ship had a complement of 82 officers and ratings.

Sybille had a main armament consisting of three single QF 4-inch (102 mm) Mk IV guns on the centreline, with one on the forecastle, one aft and one between the middle and aft funnels. Torpedo armament consisted of two twin torpedo tubes for 21 in (533 mm) torpedoes located aft of the funnels. A single 2-pdr 40 mm (1.6 in) "pom-pom" anti-aircraft gun was carried. The destroyer was also fitted with racks and storage for depth charges. Initially, only two depth charges were carried but the number increased in service and by 1918, the vessel was carrying between 30 and 50 depth charges.

== Construction and career ==
Sybille was laid down by Yarrow at their shipyard in Scotstoun, Glasgow, in August 1915, launched on 5 February 1917 and completed during the same month. The ship was the fifth of the name in service with the Royal Navy, named after Sibylle, the French form of a name for a female oracle in classical antiquity. The vessel was deployed as part of the Harwich Force, joining the Tenth Destroyer Flotilla. The flotilla was involved in supporting the convoys that crossed the North Sea.

On 4 June 1917, the destroyer formed part of the escort for the monitors Erebus and Terror in their bombardment of Ostend. Out of the 115 shells fired, 20 hit the dockyard or nearby. This was to be the last such attack for many months. Between 16 and 17 October 1917, the destroyer was called upon to be part of a large force of 84 warships sent out to search for a German fleet based around a minelayer, although Sybille saw no action. On 1 October 1918, the ship took part in a flotilla led by the destroyer leader Montrose that sailed to intercept retreating German forces, but did not find any. This was one of the final voyages undertaken by the Harwich Force during the war.

After the Armistice of 11 November 1918 that ended the war, the Royal Navy returned to a peacetime level of strength and both the number of ships and the amount of personnel in service needed to be reduced to save money. On 1 April 1919 Sybille' was placed in reserve at the Nore. In July 1923, the Navy decided to scrap many of the older destroyers in preparation for the introduction of newer and larger vessels. In a brief respite, on 26 July 1924, the vessel participated as part of a flotilla of reserve destroyers in a naval review in front of George V. Soon afterwards, the warship was retired and, on 5 November 1926, sold to Cashmore to be broken up at Newport.

== Pennant numbers ==
Pennant number	Date
F77	January 1917
F67	January 1918
F16	January 1919
H48	January 1922
