= HMS Tyrant =

British Yarrow Later M-Class destroyer

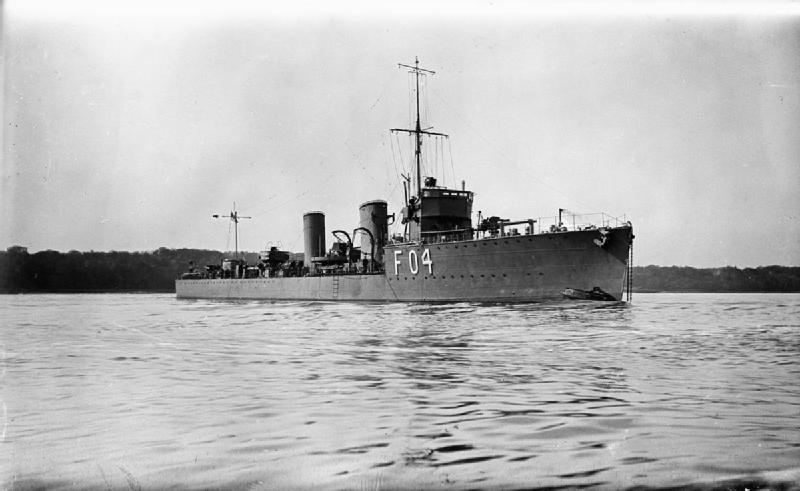
- The related Nerissa

History

United Kingdom
- Name: Tyrant
- Ordered: March 1916
- Builder: Yarrow Shipbuilders, Glasgow
- Laid down: March 1916
- Launched: 19 May 1917
- Completed: July 1917
- Out of service: 15 January 1939
- Fate: Sold to be broken up

General characteristics
- Class & type: Yarrow Later M-class destroyer
- Displacement: 930 long tons (940 t) (normal)
- Length: 273 ft 6 in (83.4 m) (o/a)
- Beam: 25 ft 7.5 in (7.8 m)
- Draught: 9 ft (2.7 m)
- Installed power: 3 Yarrow boilers, 27,800 shp (20,700 kW)
- Propulsion: Parsons steam turbines, 2 shafts
- Speed: 36 knots (67 km/h; 41 mph)
- Range: 1,860 nmi (3,440 km; 2,140 mi) at 20 kn (37 km/h; 23 mph)
- Complement: 82
- Armament: 3 × single QF 4-inch (102 mm) guns; 1 × single 2-pdr 40 mm (1.6 in) "pom-pom" AA gun; 2 × twin 21 in (533 mm) torpedo tubes

HMS Tyrant was the a Yarrow Later M-class destroyer, or Yarrow R-class, destroyer that served in the Royal Navy during the First World War. The Later M class was an improvement on those of the preceding Yarrow M class, with a narrower beam. Launched in 1917, Tyrant joined the Eleventh Destroyer Flotilla of the Grand Fleet. In 1918, the flotilla took part in one of the final sorties of the war. After the Armistice that ended the war, the ship was briefly placed in reserve before being allocated to the stone frigate Fisgard in 1925. Ten years later, Tyrant participated in a fleet review to celebrate the Silver Jubilee of George V. Subsequently, the destroyer was allocated to be tender to the destroyer Saladin before being sold to be broken up in 1939.

== Design and development ==
As the First World War progressed, the Royal Navy required more, and more modern, warships. In March 1916, within the Eighth War Programme, the British Admiralty ordered three vessels from Yarrow Shipbuilders as part of a wider order of R-class destroyers. The R class was generally similar to the preceding M class, but differed, primarily, in having geared steam turbines. The Yarrow-built ships differed in retaining the direct drive turbines of the M class and are therefore often called the Yarrow Later M class. They were similar to the preceding Yarrow M class but distinguished by their greater tonnage, narrower beam and sloping sterns. Tyrant was the second of the three to be launched.

Tyrant had a length of 273 ft 6 in (83.4 m) overall, with a beam of 25 ft 7.5 in (7.8 m) and draught of 9 ft (2.7 m). Displacement was 930 long tons (940 t) normal. Power was provided by three Yarrow boilers feeding Parsons direct-drive steam turbines rated at 27,000 shaft horsepower (20,000 kW). The turbines drove two shafts and exhausted through two funnels. Design speed was 36 knots (67 km/h; 41 mph). In trials, the destroyer achieved 39,117 kn (72,445 km/h; 45,015 mph) at a displacement of 780 long tons (790 t). Between 215 and 260 long tons (218 and 264 t) of oil was carried. Design range was 1,860 nautical miles (3,440 km; 2,140 mi) at 20 knots (37 km/h; 23 mph). The ship had a complement of 82 officers and ratings.

Tyrant had a main armament consisting of three single QF 4-inch (102 mm) Mk IV guns on the centreline, with one on the forecastle, one aft and one between the middle and aft funnels. Torpedo armament consisted of two twin torpedo tubes for 21 in (533 mm) torpedoes located aft of the funnels. A single 2-pdr 40 mm (1.6 in) "pom-pom" anti-aircraft gun was carried. The destroyer was also fitted with racks and storage for depth charges. Initially, only two depth charges were carried but the number increased in service and by 1918, the vessel was carrying between 30 and 50 depth charges.

== Construction and career ==
Tyrant was laid down by Yarrow at their shipyard in Scotstoun, Glasgow, in March 1916, launched on 19 May 1917 and completed in July that year. The ship was the first, and so far only, vessel of the name in service with the Royal Navy. deployed as part of the Grand Fleet, joining the Eleventh Destroyer Flotilla based a Scapa Flow. The flotilla took part in the Royal Navy's engagement with one of the final sorties of the German High Seas Fleet during the First World War, on 24 April 1918, although the two fleets did not actually meet and the destroyer returned unharmed. At the end of the war, the destroyer was part of the Fourteenth Destroyer Flotilla.

After the Armistice of 11 November 1918 that ended the war, the Royal Navy returned to a peacetime level of strength and both the number of ships and personnel were culled to save money. The destroyer was transferred to reserve at Portsmouth. It was announced that Tyrant would replace the destroyer Rival as tender to the stone frigate Fisgard on 11 September 1925.

On 16 July 1935, Tyrant was one of over 100 ships of the Royal Navy in a fleet review to celebrate the Silver Jubilee of George V. On 1 April the following year, the destroyer was allocated as a tender to Saladin. However, as newer, larger and more powerful vessels were introduced into the Royal Navy, older destroyers were retired. On 15 January 1939, the warship was retired and sold to Cashmore to be broken up at Newport.

== Pennant numbers ==
Pennant number	Date
F90	April 1917
G07	January 1918
G49	June 1918
F14	January 1919
H46	January 1922
G4A	September 1922
