= Yarrow Later M-class destroyer =

British navy ships

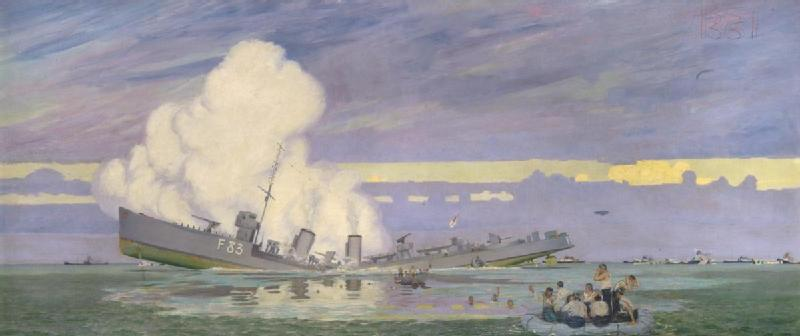
- A painting of the sinking of HMS Ulleswater by Charles Pears

Class overview
- Operators: Royal Navy
- Preceded by: Yarrow M class
- Built: 1915–1917
- In commission: 1916–1939
- Completed: 7
- Lost: 3

General characteristics
- Type: Destroyer
- Displacement: 897 long tons (911 t) light; 930 long tons (945 t) normal
- Length: 273 ft 6 in (83.36 m)
- Beam: 25 ft 7.5 in (7.81 m)
- Draught: 9 ft 1 in (2.77 m)
- Propulsion: 3 × Yarrow-type boilers; Parsons direct-drive steam turbines; 27,000 hp (20,134 kW); 2 shafts; 200–256 tons oil
- Speed: 36 knots (41 mph; 67 km/h)
- Complement: 82
- Armament: 3 × QF 4-inch (101.6 mm) Mark IV guns, mounting P Mk.IX; 1 × single QF 2 pdr "pom-pom" Mk.II; 2 × twin 21 in (533 mm) torpedo tubes

The Yarrow Later M class were a class of seven destroyers built for the Royal Navy that saw service during World War I. They were sometimes described as the Yarrow R class of destroyers, although they lacked the geared steam turbines of their sisters. The design was based on the preceding and successful Yarrow M class with minor alterations; notably reduced beam to compensate for increased displacement and a sloping stern. They were armed with three single QF 4-inch (102 mm) guns and four torpedo tubes for 21 in (533 mm) torpedoes. Three of the class were sunk during the war in enemy action, two by German U-boats and one by the German light cruisers Bremse and Brummer. Of the four that survived, two were sold to be broken up on the same day in 1926, one the following year and the last in 1939.

== Design and development ==
As the First World War progressed, the Royal Navy required more, and more modern, warships. In July 1915 and March 1916, the British Admiralty ordered seven vessels from Yarrow Shipbuilders as part of a wider order of R-class destroyers. The R class was generally similar to the preceding M class, but differed in, primarily, in having geared steam turbines. The Yarrow-built ships differed in retaining the direct drive turbines of the M class and are therefore often called the Yarrow Later M class as well as the Yarrow R class. They were similar to the preceding Yarrow M class but distinguished by their greater tonnage, narrower beam and sloping sterns.

The destroyers had a length of 273 ft 6 in (83.4 m) overall, with a beam of 25 ft 7.5 in (7.8 m) and draught of 9 ft (2.7 m). Displacement was 897 long tons (911 t) light and 930 long tons (940 t) normal. Power was provided by three Yarrow boilers feeding Parsons direct-drive steam turbines rated at 27,000 shaft horsepower (20,000 kW). The turbines drove two shafts and exhausted through two funnels. Design speed was 36 knots (67 km/h; 41 mph). The destroyers carried between 200 and 250 tonnes (200 and 250 long tons; 220 and 280 short tons) of fuel oil that gave a design range of 1,860 nautical miles (3,440 km; 2,140 mi) at 20 knots (37 km/h; 23 mph). They had a complement of 82 officers and ratings.

The ships had a main armament consisting of three single QF 4-inch (102 mm) Mk IV guns on the centreline, with one on the forecastle, one aft and one between the middle and aft funnels. Torpedo armament consisted of two twin torpedo tubes for 21 in (533 mm) torpedoes located aft of the funnels. A 2-pounder 40 mm (1.6 in) "pom-pom" anti-aircraft gun was carried. The destroyers were also fitted with racks and storage for depth charges. Initially, only two depth charges were carried but the number increased in service and by 1918, the vessels still in service were carrying between 30 and 50 depth charges.

== Ships ==
Four vessels were ordered in July 1915:

- Sabrina – Laid down August 1915, launched 24 July 1916, completed September 1916. Sold for breaking up 5 November 1926.
- Strongbow – Launched 30 September 1916 and completed late 1916. Sunk by gunfire from German light cruisers Bremse and Brummer off Norway, 17 October 1917.
- Surprise – Launched 25 November 1916 and completed 1916, torpedoed and sunk by German U-boat off Maas light ship on night of 22 December/23 December 1917.
- Sybille – Laid down August 1915, launched 5 February 1917, completed February 1917. Sold for breaking up 5 November 1926.

Three vessels were ordered in March 1916:

- Truculent – Laid down March 1916, launched 24 March 1917, completed May 1917. Sold for breaking up 29 April 1927.
- Tyrant – Laid down March 1916, launched 19 May 1917, completed July 1917. Sold for breaking up 15 January 1939.
- Ulleswater – Launched 4 August 1917 and completed 1917, torpedoed and sunk by German U-boat UC-17 off Dutch coast 15 August 1918.

== Bibliography ==
- Cocker, Maurice (1981). Destroyers of the Royal Navy, 1893–1981. London: Ian Allan. ISBN 978-0-71101-075-8.
- Colledge, James Joseph; Warlow, Ben (2006). Ships of the Royal Navy: The Complete Record of All Fighting Ships of the Royal Navy. London: Chatham Press. ISBN 978-1-93514-907-1.
- Friedman, Norman (2009). British Destroyers: From Earliest Days to the Second World War. Barnsley: Seaforth Publishing. ISBN 978-1-84832-049-9.
- Kemp, Paul (1999). The Admiralty Regrets: British Warship Losses of the 20th Century. Stroud: Sutton. ISBN 978-0-75091-567-0.
- March, Edgar J. (1966). British Destroyers: A History of Development, 1892–1953; Drawn by Admiralty Permission From Official Records & Returns, Ships' Covers & Building Plans. London: Seeley Service. OCLC 164893555.
- Parkes, Oscar; Prendergast, Maurice (1969). Jane's Fighting Ships 1919. Newton Abbott: David & Charles. OCLC 907574860.
- Preston, Antony (1985). "Great Britain and Empire Forces". In Gardiner, Robert; Gray, Randal (eds.). Conway's All the World's Fighting Ships 1906–1921. London: Conway Maritime Press. pp. 1–104. ISBN 978-0-85177-245-5.
