= HMS Ulleswater (1917) =

1917 Yarrow R-class destroyer

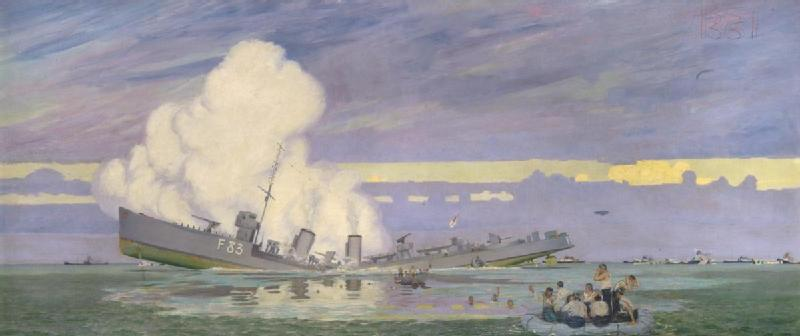
- A painting of the sinking of HMS Ulleswater by Charles Pears

History

United Kingdom
- Name: HMS Ulleswater
- Ordered: 1916
- Builder: Yarrow Shipbuilders, Glasgow
- Laid down: 1916
- Launched: 4 August 1917
- Fate: Sunk on 15 August 1918

General characteristics
- Class & type: Yarrow M-class destroyer
- Displacement: 930 long tons (940 t)
- Length: 273 ft 6 in (83.36 m)
- Beam: 25 ft 7 1/2 in (7.81 m)
- Draught: 9 ft (2.7 m)
- Propulsion: 3 boilers; 2 Parsons direct drive steam turbines, 27,000 shp (20,000 kW)
- Speed: 36 knots (41.4 mph; 66.7 km/h)
- Complement: 82
- Armament: 3 × QF 4-inch (102 mm) Mark IV guns; 1 × single 2-pounder (40-mm) "pom-pom" Mk. II anti-aircraft gun; 4 × 21 in (533 mm) torpedo tubes (2×2)

HMS Ulleswater (or Ullswater) was a Yarrow Later M-class destroyer which fought in the First World War as part of the Royal Navy.

She was ordered and laid down in 1916 at Yarrow Shipbuilders, being completed and launched on 4 August 1917.

In April 1918, the ship was assigned to 'Outer Patrol off Zeebrugge' during the Zeebrugge Raid.

On 15 August 1918, she was sunk by German submarine U-71 or UC-17 in the North Sea. Five sailors were reported to have died.

There is a painting of the sinking by the war artist Charles Pears in the Imperial War Museum.
