= French ship Sibylle =

Eleven ships of the French Navy have borne the name Sibylle:

== Ships named Sybille ==
- Sibylle (1666), a six-gun frigate
- Sibylle (1676), a 6-gun corvette
- Sibylle (1689), a 6-gun corvette
- Sibylle (1704), a 12-gun frigate
- Sibylle (1729), a barque
- Sibylle (1777), a 32-gun frigate, lead ship of her class
- Sibylle (1791), a 38-gun Hébé-class frigate
- Sibylle (1801), a 40-gun frigate
- Sibylle (1847), a 50-gun frigate
- Sibylle (Q175), a Diane-class submarine
- Sibylle (S617), a British S-class submarine loaned in 1952 and lost eleven weeks later

== See also ==
- HMS Sibyl
