= HMS Moon (1915) =

Destroyer of the Royal Navy

HMS Moon was an Yarrow M-class destroyer which served in the Royal Navy during the First World War. The M class was an improvement on those of the preceding L class, capable of higher speed. Launched in 1915, the vessel served as part of the Grand Fleet during the First World War and was sold to be broken up in 1921.
