= HMS Mary Rose (1915) =

Admiralty M-class destroyer

History

United Kingdom
- Name: HMS Mary Rose
- Builder: Swan Hunter
- Launched: 8 October 1915
- Fate: Sunk, 17 October 1917

General characteristics
- Class & type: Admiralty M-class destroyer
- Displacement: 994 long tons (1,010 t) (normal); 1,014 long tons (1,030 t) (full load)
- Length: 265 ft (81 m) (p.p.)
- Beam: 26 ft 8 in (8.13 m)
- Draught: 8 ft 11 in (2.72 m)
- Installed power: 3 Yarrow boilers, 25,000 shp (19,000 kW)
- Propulsion: Brown-Curtiss steam turbines, 3 shafts
- Speed: 34 knots (63 km/h; 39 mph)
- Range: 2,530 nautical miles (4,690 km; 2,910 mi) at 15 knots (28 km/h; 17 mph)
- Complement: 80
- Armament: 3 × single QF 4 in (102 mm) Mark IV guns; 2 × single QF 2 pdr "pom-pom" gun; 2 × twin 21 inch (533 mm) torpedo tubes

HMS Mary Rose was an Admiralty M-class destroyer that served in the Royal Navy during the First World War. The M class was an improvement on those of the preceding L class, capable of higher speed. The destroyer was armed with three single QF 4 in (102 mm) guns and four tubes for 21 in (533 mm) torpedoes. Launched in October 1915, the destroyer served with the Twelfth Destroyer Flotilla of the Grand Fleet. Mary Rose was sunk on 17 October 1917 by the German light cruisers SMS Brummer and SMS Bremse in an action approximately 70 miles (110 km) east of Lerwick while escorting a convoy of twelve merchant ships from Norway.

== Design and development ==
Mary Rose was one of the sixteen Admiralty M-class destroyers ordered by the British Admiralty in September 1914 as part of the First War Programme. The M class was an improved version of the earlier L class, required to reach a higher speed in order to counter rumoured new German fast destroyers. The remit was to have a maximum speed of 36 knots (67 km/h; 41 mph) and, although ultimately the destroyers fell short of that ambition in service, the extra performance that was achieved was valued by the navy. It transpired that the rumoured German warships did not exist.

The destroyer had a length of 265 ft (80.8 m) between perpendiculars and 273 ft 4 in (83.3 m) overall, with a beam of 26 ft 8 in (8.1 m) and draught of 8 ft 11 in (2.7 m). Displacement was 994 long tons (1,010 t) normal and 1,014 long tons (1,030 t) at full load. Power was provided by three Yarrow boilers feeding Brown-Curtiss steam turbines rated at 25,000 shaft horsepower (19,000 kW), driving three shafts and exhausting through three funnels. Mary Rose produced 25,940 shp (19,340 kW) during trials. Design speed was 34 knots (63 km/h; 39 mph). A total of 228 long tons (232 t) of oil was carried, which gave a design range of 2,530 nautical miles (4,690 km; 2,910 mi) at 15 knots (28 km/h; 17 mph). The ship had a complement of 80 officers and ratings.

Mary Rose had a main armament consisting of three single QF 4 in (102 mm) Mk IV guns on the centreline, with one on the forecastle, one aft on a raised platform and one between the middle and aft funnels. Torpedo armament consisted of two twin torpedo tubes for 21 in (533 mm) torpedoes located aft of the funnels. Two single 1-pounder 37 mm (1.5 in) "pom-pom" anti-aircraft guns were carried. The anti-aircraft guns were later replaced by single 2-pdr 40 mm (1.6 in) "pom-pom" guns and the destroyer was fitted with racks and storage for two depth charges.

== Construction and career ==
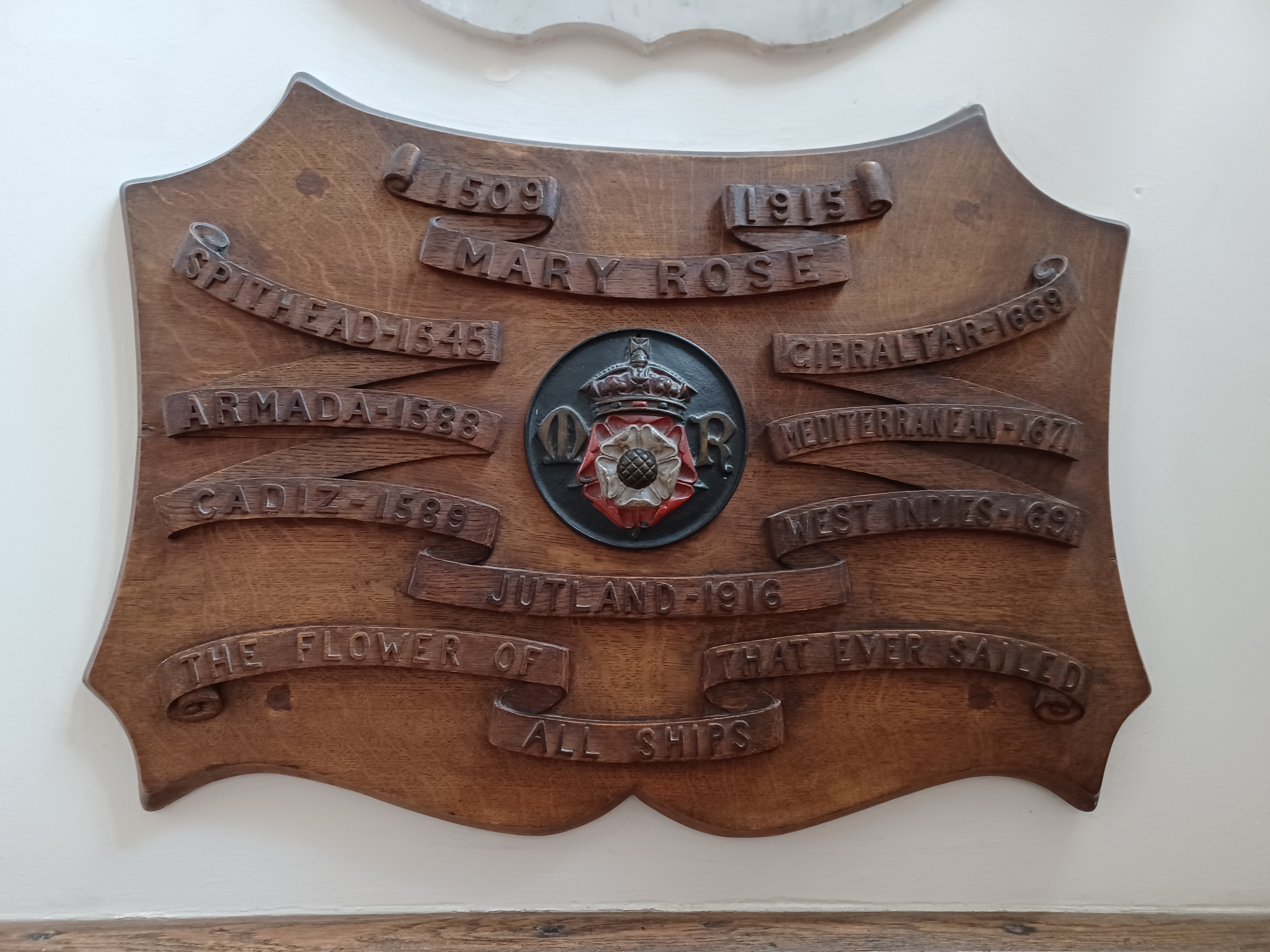
Plaque to Mary Rose in Plymouth Cathedral

Laid down by Swan Hunter & Wigham Richardson at their shipyard in Wallsend, Mary Rose was launched on 8 October 1915. The vessel was deployed as part of the Grand Fleet, joining the Twelfth Destroyer Flotilla. The destroyer was one of eight based at Lerwick that operated an escort service for convoys between Norway and the Shetland Islands. On 16 October 1917, along with fellow destroyer Strongbow and the armed trawlers Elise and P. Fannon, left Lerwick to meet with an incoming convoy that had sailed from Norway on 16 October. At dawn on the following day, the captain of the Mary Rose, Lieutenant-Commander Fox, observed two warships approaching. Their profiles and dark-grey colour led him to assume they were British light cruisers, and recognition signals were duly transmitted. The approaching ships were in fact the German light cruisers SMS Brummer and SMS Bremse, despatched as part of a plan by Admiral Reinhard Scheer to supplement U-boats with high speed surface raiders. The convoy was then 70 miles (110 km) east of Lerwick.

The German ships closed to 2,700 metres (3,000 yd) before opening fire, quickly sinking the convoy's second escort, Strongbow. Mary Rose was hit in the engine room shortly afterwards, and disabled. Sub-Lieutenant Marsh, RNVR, maintained fire with the one gun left operational, while the only two surviving members of the torpedo crew, French and Bailey, were able to fire the last remaining torpedo, but to no avail. With further salvoes wrecking the superstructure, Fox ordered Master Gunner Handcock to scuttle the ship. The ship's boats reduced to matchwood, only a handful of men survived by clinging to a raft; Fox and the First Lieutenant went down with the ship. Several hours later, the survivors boarded a lifeboat from one of the merchant ships and were able to reach Norway. A total of 83 were killed.

The escorts sunk, Brummer and Bremse proceeded to sink nine of the merchant ships; only three survived. One of the crew, Ordinary Seaman Alfred Holden, died in Norway and is buried in Fredrikstad Military Cemetery. In response to the new threat of surface raiders, later convoys were accorded heavier escorts, which ensured there was no repetition of the disaster.

== Bibliography ==
- Colledge, J. J.; Warlow, Ben (2006) [1969]. Ships of the Royal Navy: The Complete Record of All Fighting Ships of the Royal Navy from the 15th Century to the Present (3rd Rev ed.). London: Chatham Publishing. ISBN 978-1-86176-281-8. OCLC 67375475.
- Friedman, Norman (2009). British Destroyers: From Earliest Days to the Second World War. Barnsley: Seaforth Publishing. ISBN 978-1-84832-049-9.
- Halpern, Paul G. (1995). A Naval History of World War I. London: UCL Press. ISBN 978-1-85728-498-0.
- Kemp, Paul (1999). The Admiralty Regrets: British Warship Losses of the 20th Century. Stroud: Sutton. ISBN 978-0-75091-567-0.
- March, Edgar J. (1966). British Destroyers: A History of Development, 1892–1953; Drawn by Admiralty Permission From Official Records & Returns, Ships' Covers & Building Plans. London: Seeley Service. OCLC 164893555.
- McBride, Keith (1991). "British 'M' Class Destroyers of 1913–14". In Gardiner, Robert (ed.). Warship 1991. London: Conway Maritime Press. pp. 34–49. ISBN 978-0-85177-582-1.
- Newbolt, Henry (1931). Naval Operations: Volume V. History of the Great War. London: Longmans, Green and Co. OCLC 220475309.
- Parkes, Oscar & Prendergast, Maurice (1969). Jane's Fighting Ships 1919. Newton Abbott: David & Charles. OCLC 907574860.
- Preston, Antony (1985). "Great Britain and Empire Forces". In Gardiner, Robert & Gray, Randal (eds.). Conway's All the World's Fighting Ships 1906–1921. London: Conway Maritime Press. pp. 1–104. ISBN 978-0-85177-245-5.
