= Yarrow M-class destroyer =

1914 class of British destroyers

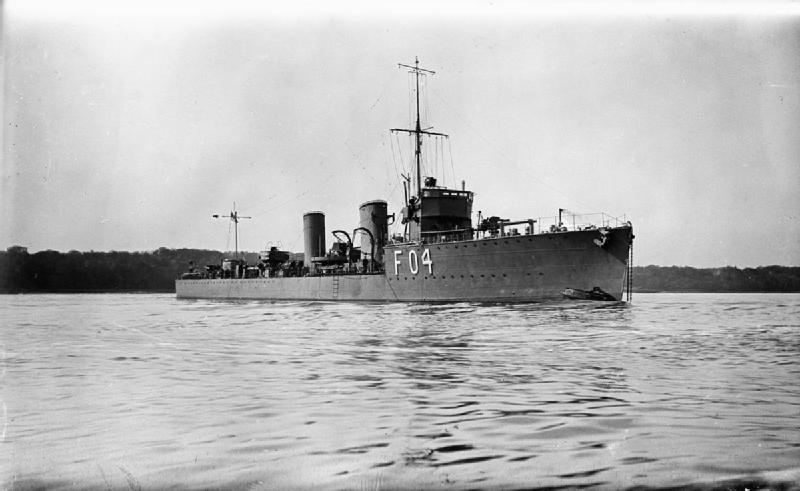
- HMS Nerissa

Class overview
- Operators: Royal Navy
- Built: 1912–1916
- In commission: 1914–1926
- Completed: 10

General characteristics
- Type: Destroyer
- Displacement: Miranda, Minos, Manley : 850 long tons (864 t) standard; 990 long tons (1,006 t) full load; Moon, Morning Star, Mounsey, Musketeer, Nerissa, Relentless & Rival : 930 long tons (945 t) standard
- Length: Miranda, Minos, Manley : 269 ft 6 in (82.14 m); Moon, Morning Star, Mounsey, Musketeer, Nerissa, Relentless & Rival : 273 ft 6 in (83.36 m)
- Beam: 25 ft 7.5 in (7.81 m)
- Draught: 10 ft 6 in (3.20 m)
- Propulsion: 3 × Yarrow-type boilers; Brown-Curtis steam turbines; 2 shafts; 230 tons oil; Miranda, Minos, Manley: 23,000 hp (17,151 kW); Moon, Morning Star, Mounsey, Musketeer, Nerissa, Relentless & Rival : 27,000 hp (20,134 kW)
- Speed: 36 knots (67 km/h; 41 mph)
- Complement: 79
- Armament: 3 × QF 4-inch (102 mm) Mark IV guns, mounting P Mk.IX; 1 × single QF 2 pdr "pom-pom" Mk.II; 2 × twin 21 in (533 mm) torpedo tubes

The Yarrow M class was a class of ten destroyers built for the Royal Navy that saw service during World War I. They were generally similar to the standard Admiralty M-class destroyer, but were instead designed by the builder, Yarrow & Company. Generally, they had two instead of three shafts, as well as two funnels and a straight stern, with the bridge set well back from the forecastle. The first trio were two knots faster than the Admiralty M type, despite less installed power and one less shaft; the installed power was increased for the later vessels. Jane's Fighting Ships describes the class as "very successful boats", and all ten vessels survived throughout the war to be broken up during the 1920s. Moon, Mounsey and Musketeer were each fitted to carry a kite balloon.

== Pre-war ships purchased 1913 ==
Three vessels already building by Yarrow were purchased in March 1913 as part of the pre-war 1913–14 programme.

- Miranda – Begun October 1912, launched 27 May 1914, and completed August 1914. Sold for breaking up 26 October 1921.
- Minos – Begun October 1912, launched 6 August 1914, and completed October 1914. Sold for breaking up 31 August 1920.
- Manly – Begun October 1912, launched 12 October 1914, and completed November 1914. Sold for breaking up 26 October 1921.

== Ships ordered under the War Emergency Programme ==
Four vessels were ordered in September 1914.

- Moon – Begun September 1914, launched 23 April 1915, and completed June 1915. Sold for breaking up 9 May 1921.
- Morning Star – Begun September 1914, launched 26 June 1915, and completed August 1915. Sold for breaking up 1 December 1921.
- Mounsey – Begun September 1914, launched 11 September 1915, and completed November 1915. Sold for breaking up 8 November 1921.
- Musketeer – Begun September 1914, launched 12 November 1915, and completed December 1915. Sold for breaking up 25 November 1921.

One vessel was ordered in early November 1914.

- Nerissa – Begun November 1914, launched 9 February 1916, and completed March 1916. Sold for breaking up 15 November 1921.

Two vessels were ordered in May 1915.

- Relentless – Begun May 1915, launched 15 April 1916, and completed May 1916. Sold for breaking up 5 November 1926.
- Rival – Begun May 1915, launched 14 June 1916, and completed September 1916. Sold for breaking up 13 July 1926.

Seven destroyers to an amended Yarrow design were ordered in August 1915 and later (see Yarrow Later M-class destroyer).

== Bibliography ==
- Destroyers of the Royal Navy, 1893–1981, Maurice Cocker, 1983, Ian Allan ISBN 0-7110-1075-7
- Jane's Fighting Ships, 1919, Jane's Publishing
- Ships of the Royal Navy, J.J.Colledge
- British Destroyers, 1892–1953, Edgar J. March
- The Metal Fighting Ships, 1860–1970, E.H.H. Archibald
