= HMS Strongbow (1916) =

Destroyer of the Royal Navy

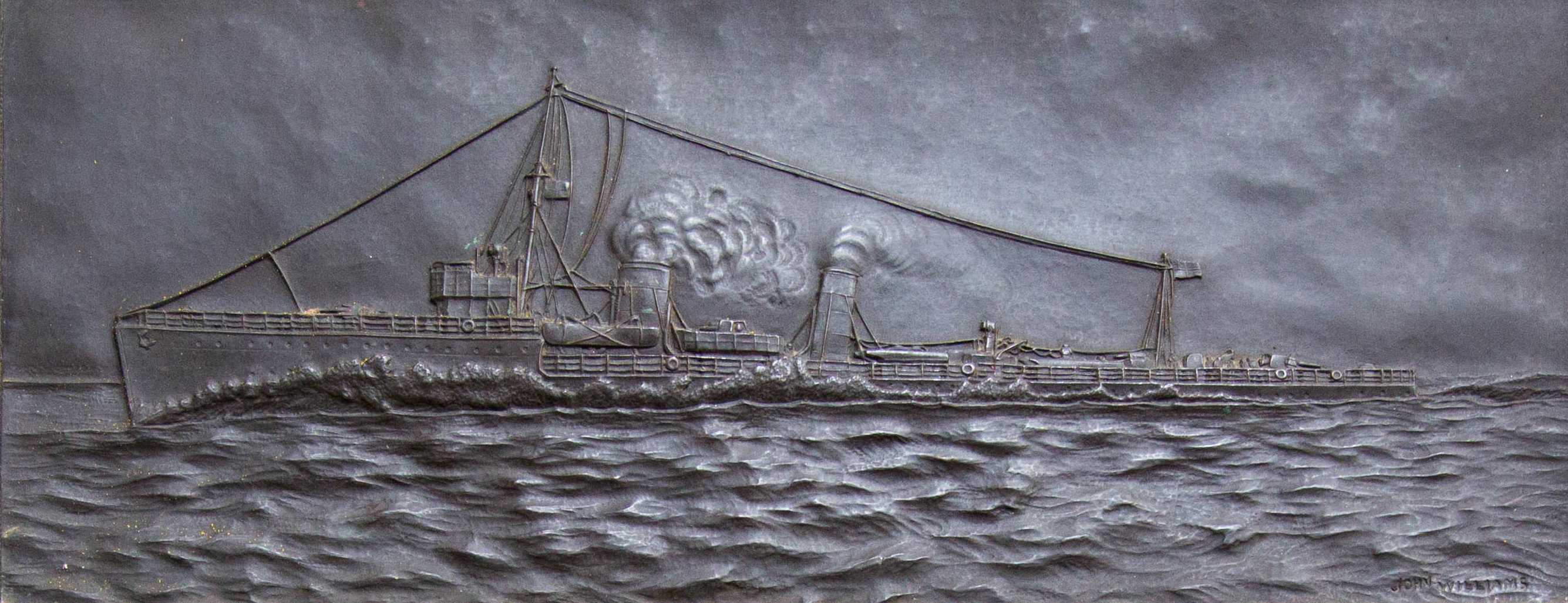
- Strongbow

History

United Kingdom
- Name: HMS Strongbow
- Builder: Yarrow Shipbuilders, Glasgow
- Launched: 30 September 1916
- Fate: Sunk 17 October 1917

General characteristics
- Class & type: Yarrow M-class destroyer
- Displacement: 930 long tons (940 t)
- Length: 273 ft 6 in (83.36 m)
- Beam: 25 ft 7 1/2 in (7.81 m)
- Draught: 9 ft (2.7 m)
- Propulsion: 3 boilers; 2 Parsons direct drive steam turbines, 27,000 shp (20,000 kW)
- Speed: 36 knots (41.4 mph; 66.7 km/h)
- Complement: 82
- Armament: 3 × QF 4-inch (102 mm) Mark IV guns; 1 × single 2-pounder (40-mm) "pom-pom" Mk. II anti-aircraft gun; 4 × 21 in (533 mm) torpedo tubes (2×2)

HMS Strongbow was a Yarrow Later M-class destroyer built for the British Royal Navy during the First World War. The ship was launched in September 1916 and entered service in November that year. Stongbow was sunk on 17 October 1917 by the German light cruisers SMS Bremse and Brummer in the North Sea, when escorting a convoy of merchant ships from Norway.

== Construction and design ==
HMS Strongbow was ordered from Yarrow Shipbuilders in July 1915 as part of the Sixth War Programme of shipbuilding for the Royal Navy. Strongbow was built as one of the Yarrow Later M class to Yarrow's own design rather than to the Admiralty's own design for the M-class destroyer. Yarrow's design used direct-drive steam turbines rather than the geared turbines of the Admiralty design, and had two funnels rather than three. As such, they more closely resembled Yarrow R-class Specials, and are referred to as Yarrow R-class ships in some sources.

Strongbow's hull was 273 feet 6 inches (83.36 m) long overall, with a beam of 25 feet 7 1/2 inches (7.81 m) and a draught of 9 feet (2.74 m). Displacement was 930 long tons (940 t). Three Yarrow boilers fed Parsons turbines, driving two propeller shafts and generating 27,000 shaft horsepower (20,000 kW). This gave a speed of 36 knots (67 km/h; 41 mph). Armament consisted of three QF Mark IV 4 inch (102 mm) guns, with a single 2-pounder (40-mm) "pom-pom" anti-aircraft gun and four 21 inch (533 mm) torpedo tubes. The ship had a crew of 82 officers and men.

Strongbow was launched from Yarrow's Glasgow shipyard on 30 September 1916 and was completed in November that year.

== Service ==
Following commissioning, Strongbow joined the Twelfth Destroyer Flotilla of the Grand Fleet, with the pennant number G.44. Strongbow was one of eight destroyers detached to Lerwick in the Shetland Islands, with the duty of escorting the regular convoys from Scandinavia to the United Kingdom.

On 16 October 1917, Strongbow joined a westbound convoy of 12 merchant ships from Norway. The escort consisted of Strongbow, the destroyer Mary Rose and two naval trawlers. In the morning of 17 October, the convoy was attacked by two German light cruisers, the Bremse and Brummer, about 70 nautical miles (130 km; 81 mi) east of Lerwick. Strongbow sighted two unknown ships at 06:00, in poor visibility, and believing them to be Royal Navy cruisers, challenged them with recognition signals. Strongbow, receiving inadequate responses, had not yet cleared for action when the two German cruisers opened fire at a range of about 3,000 yards (2,700 m). Strongbow quickly received heavy damage and was immobilised, and after ensuring that all confidential papers had been destroyed, the captain ordered the surviving crew to abandon ship. Mary Rose, which had been ahead of the convoy, and only realised that the convoy was under attack when her crew heard gunfire, was also quickly sunk, as were nine of the merchant vessels. Neither destroyer managed to make a radio report of the attack, and the two German cruisers escaped unscathed. Forty-six of Strongbow's crew were killed in the attack.
