= Convoys in World War I =

Naval Campaign

Allied convoy system
- Part of the naval theatre of World War I
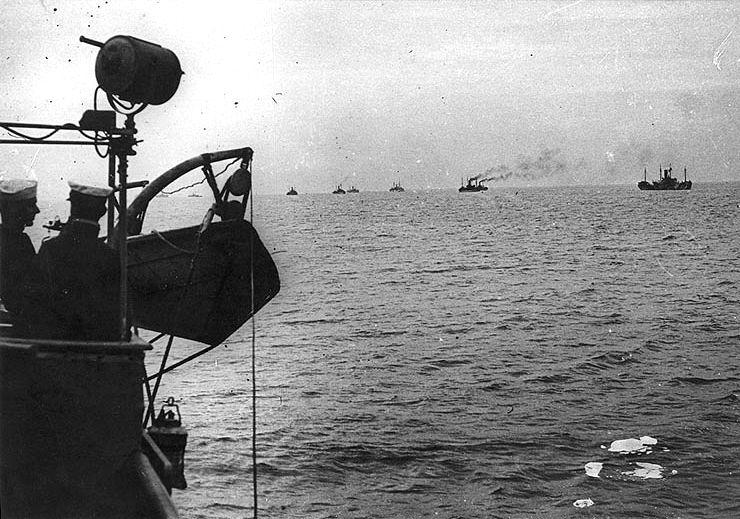
- A transatlantic convoy approaching Brest on 1 November 1918. Photograph taken from aboard USS Rambler.
| Date | 1914 – 1918 |
| Location | Atlantic Ocean, North Sea, Mediterranean Sea, Black Sea |
| Result | Allied victory |

Belligerents
| Royal Navy (Canada) Royal Canadian Navy; United States Navy; French Navy; Brazilian Navy; Regia Marina | Imperial German Navy; Austro-Hungarian Navy |

The convoy—a group of merchantmen or troopships traveling together with a naval escort—was revived during World War I (1914–18), after having been discarded at the start of the Age of Steam. Although convoys were used by the Royal Navy in 1914 to escort troopships from the Dominions, and in 1915 by both it and the French Navy to cover their own troop movements for overseas service, they were not systematically employed by any belligerent navy until 1916. The Royal Navy was the major user and developer of the modern convoy system, (Note: By "convoy system" is meant the systematic employment of convoys for all shipping or all shipping of a certain kind, such as transatlantic shipping, with naval escorts working on set schedules and routes.) and regular transoceanic convoying began in June 1917 with the assistance of the US and other Allied navies. They made heavy use of aircraft for escorts, especially in coastal waters, an obvious departure from the convoy practices of the Age of Sail.

As historian Paul E. Fontenoy put it, "[t]he convoy system defeated the German submarine campaign." From June 1917 on, the Germans were unable to meet their set objective of sinking 600,000 long tons (610,000 t) of enemy shipping per month. In 1918, they were rarely able to sink more than 300,000 long tons (300,000 t). Between May 1917 and the end of the war on 11 November 1918, only 154 of 16,539 vessels convoyed across the Atlantic had been sunk, of which 16 were lost through the natural perils of sea travel and a further 36 because they were stragglers.

== Development ==
=== Origins ===
The first large convoy of the war was the Australian and New Zealand Army Corps (ANZAC) convoy. On 18 October 1914, the Japanese battlecruiser Ibuki left the port of Wellington, New Zealand, with 10 troopships. They joined 28 Australian ships and the Australian light cruisers HMAS Sydney and Melbourne at Albany, Western Australia. The Japanese also sent the cruiser Chikuma to patrol the Indian Ocean during the convoy's crossing to Aden. During the crossing, HMAS Sydney was caught up in the Battle of Cocos (9 November), but the Japanese-escorted convoy reached Aden on 25 November. The Japanese continued to escort ANZAC convoys throughout the war. The convoys of Dominion troops were, weather permitting, escorted into port by airships.

With the advent of commerce raiding by the submarines of the Royal Navy, the Imperial Russian Navy, and the Kaiserliche Marine (Imperial German Navy), it was neutral Sweden, at the insistence of Germany, that first used a convoy system in early November 1915 to protect its own merchant shipping after the British and the Russians attacked its iron ore shipments to Germany. The German merchant fleet proposed a similar expedient, but the navy refused. However, in April 1916, Admiral Prince Heinrich of Prussia—commander-in-chief in the Baltic theater—approved regular scheduled escorts for German ships to Sweden. Losses to enemy submarines were drastically cut from the level of the previous year, and only five freighters were lost before the war's end. In June 1916, the Baltic Fleet attacked a German convoy in the Bråviken, destroying the Q-ship Schiff H and some Swedish merchantmen, before mistakes by the commander of the Destroyer Division—Aleksandr Vasiliyevich Kolchak—allowed the majority of the convoy to escape back to Norrköping.

=== Revival ===
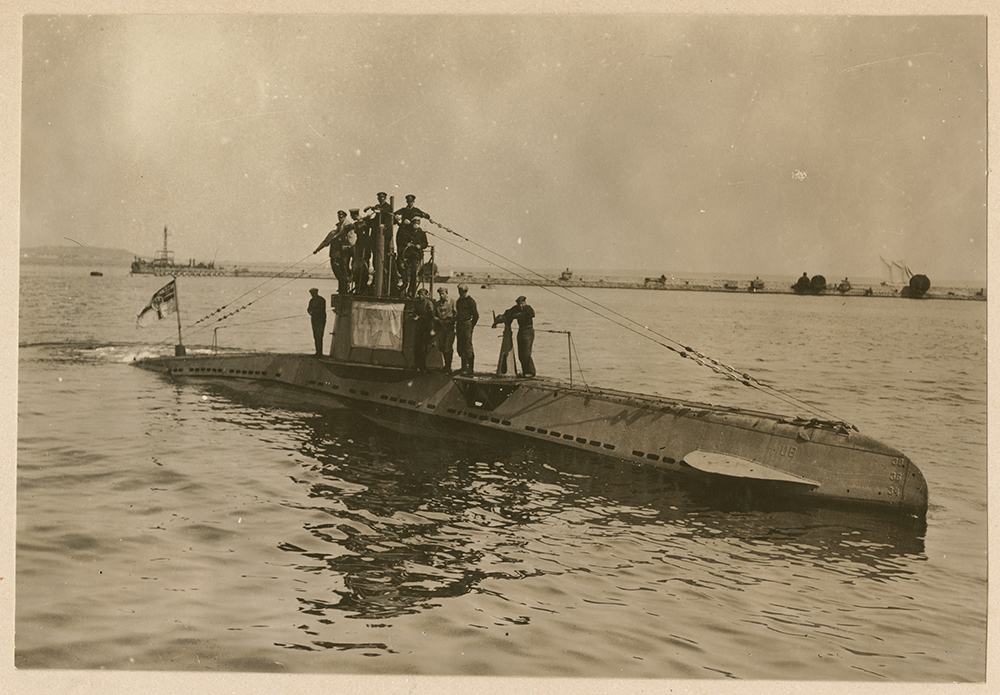
German U-boat crew, 1918

To cover trade with the neutral Netherlands, the British instituted their first regular convoy on 26 July 1916, from the Hook of Holland to Harwich, a route attacked by the German U-boats based in Flanders. Only one straggler was lost before the Germans announced unrestricted submarine warfare on 1 February 1917, and only six after that before the war's end despite 1,861 sailings. The Holland convoys were sometimes referred to as the "Beef Trip" on account of the large proportion of food transported. They were escorted by destroyers of the Harwich Force and later in the war, by AD Flying Boats from Felixstowe.

The first convoys to sail after the German announcement were requested by the French Navy, desirous of defending British coal shipments. The Royal Navy's first coal convoy crossed the Channel on 10 February. These convoys were more weakly escorted, and contained a mixture of steam ships and sailing ships, as well as escorting aircraft based on the coast. In all, only 53 ships were lost in 39,352 sailings. When shippers from Norway (the "neutral ally") requested convoys in 1916 after a year of very serious losses but refused to accept the routes chosen by the Admiralty, they were declined. After the German proclamation, the Norwegians accepted British demands and informal convoying began in late January or February 1917, but regular convoys did not begin until 29 April. That same day, the first coastal convoy left Lerwick in the Shetland Islands, the destination of the Norwegian convoys, for the Humber. This was to become a regular route. The Norwegian and coastal convoys included airships based in Scotland (and in the latter case also Yorkshire).

Although the British War Cabinet proposed convoys in March 1917, the Admiralty still refused. It was not until 860,334 long tons (874,140 t) of shipping were lost to U-boats in April (and British Isles grain reserves had dropped to six-week's supply that the Admiralty approved convoying all shipments coming through the north and south Atlantic. Rear Admiral Alexander Duff, head of the Antisubmarine Division, suggested it on 26 April, and the First Sea Lord, Admiral John Jellicoe, approved it the next day. Escorts were to be composed of obsolete cruisers, armed merchant cruisers and pre-dreadnought battleships for the oceanic portion of the routes, while in the more dangerous waters around Britain they were composed of destroyers. Observation balloons, especially kytoons, were used to help spot submarines beneath the surface, the aircraft carrier not then being developed. During discussions in March, it was determined that 75 destroyers were needed, but only 43 were available. The first experimental convoy of merchant vessels left Gibraltar on 10 May 1917 and arrived at the Downs on 22 May, having been accompanied by the last leg of its journey by a flying boat from the Scillies.

=== Maturation ===
The first transatlantic convoy left Hampton Roads on 24 May escorted by the armored cruiser HMS Roxburgh, met up with eight destroyers from Devonport on 6 June, and brought all its ships save one straggler that was torpedoed, into their respective ports by 10 June. The first regular convoy left Hampton Roads on 15 June, the next left Sydney, Nova Scotia on 22 June, and another left New York for the first time on 6 July. The Sydney convoy had to be diverted to Halifax during winter months. The first regular convoy from the south Atlantic commenced on 31 July. Fast convoys embarked from Sierra Leone—a British protectorate—while slow ones left from Dakar in French West Africa. Gibraltar convoys became regular starting on 26 July.

Losses in convoy dropped to ten percent of those suffered by independent ships. Confidence in the convoy system grew rapidly in the summer of 1917, especially as it was realised that the ratio of merchant vessels to warship could be higher than previously thought. While the first convoys comprised 12 ships, by June they contained 20, which was increased to 26 in September and 36 in October. The U.S. Navy's liaison to Britain—Rear Admiral William Sims—and its ambassador—Walter H. Page—were both strong supporters of convoying and opponents of Germany's unrestricted submarine warfare. Shortly after the U.S. entered the war, Sims brought over 30 destroyers to the waters around Britain to make up the Royal Navy's deficit.

The success of the convoys forced the German U-boats in the Atlantic to divert their attention from inbound shipping to outbound. In response, the first outbound convoy left for Hampton Roads on 11 August 1917. It was followed by matching outbound convoys for each regular route. These were escorted by destroyers as they left Britain and were taken over by the typical cruiser flotillas as they entered the open ocean.

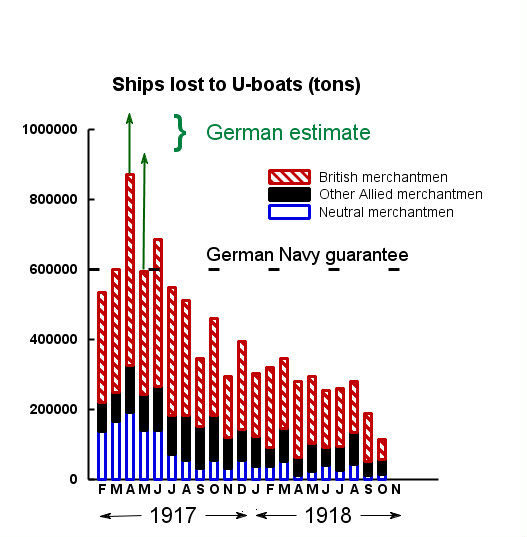
Tonnage of British and neutral shipping lost in 1917 and 1918, showing failure of unrestricted U-boat warfare. The German admiralty's target was only reached in the first few months, although it grossly overestimated its successes.

The Germans again responded by changing strategy and concentrating on the Mediterranean theater, where the extremely limited use of convoys had been approved at the Corfu Conference (28 April–1 May 1916). The Mediterranean proved a more difficult zone for convoying than the Atlantic, because its routes were more complex and the entire sea was considered a danger zone (like British home waters). There the escorts were not provided only by Britain. The French Navy, U.S. Navy, Imperial Japanese Navy, Regia Marina (Royal Italian Navy) and Brazilian Navy all contributed. The first routes to receive convoy protection were the coal route from Egypt to Italy via Bizerte, French Tunisia, and that between southern metropolitan France and French Algeria. The U.S. took responsibility for the ingoing routes to Gibraltar, and increasingly for most of the eastern Mediterranean. The commander-in-chief of the Royal Navy in the Mediterranean, Somerset Calthorpe, began introducing the convoy system for the route from Port Said to Britain in mid-October 1917. Calthorpe remained short of escorts and was unable to cover all Mediterranean trade, but his request to divert warships from convoy duty to the less effective Otranto Barrage was denied by the Admiralty.

With the gradual success of the Mediterranean convoys, the Germans began to concentrate on attacking shipping in Britain's coastal waters, as convoyed vessels dispersed to their individual ports. Coastal convoy routes were only added gradually due to the limited availability of escorts, but by the end of the war almost all sea traffic in the war zones was convoyed. The coastal convoys relied heavily on air support. After June 1918, almost all convoys were escorted in part by land-based airplanes and airships, as well as sea planes. The organisation of these convoys had also been delegated by the Admiralty to local commanders.

== Admiralty resistance and objections ==
The main objection of the Admiralty to providing escorts for merchant shipping (as opposed to troop transits) was that it did not have sufficient forces. In large part, this was based on miscalculation. The Admiralty's estimates of the number of vessels requiring escort and the number of escorts required per convoy—it mistakenly assumed a 1:1 ratio between escorts and merchant vessels—were both wrong. The former error was exposed by Commander R. G. H. Henderson of the Antisubmarine Division and Norman Leslie of the Ministry of Shipping, who showed that the Admiralty was relying on customs statistics that counted each arrival and departure, concluding that 2,400 vessels a week, translating into 300 ships a day, required an escort. In fact, there were only 140 ships per week, or 20 per day, on transoceanic voyages. But the manageability of the task was not the Admiralty's only objection.

It alleged that convoys presented larger and easier targets to U-boats, and harder object to defend by the Navy, raising the danger of the submarine threat rather than lowering it. It cited the difficulty of coordinating a rendezvous, which would lead to vulnerability while the merchant ships were in the process of assembling, and a greater risk of mines. The Admiralty also showed a distrust of the merchant skippers: they could not manoeuvre in company, especially considering that the ships would have various top speeds, nor could they be expected to keep station. At a conference in February 1917, some merchant captains raised the same concerns. Finally, the Admiralty suggested that a large number of merchantmen arriving simultaneously would be too much tonnage for the ports to handle, but this, too, was based in part on the miscalculation.

In light of the cult of the offensive, the convoy was also dismissed as "defensive". In fact, it reduced the number of available targets for U-boats, forcing them to attack well-defended positions and usually giving them only a single chance, since the escorting warships would respond with a counterattack. It also "narrowed to the least possible limits [the area in which the submarine is to be hunted]", according to the Anti-Submarine Report of the Royal Navy Air Service (RNAS) of December 1917. In that month, the First Lord of the Admiralty—Eric Geddes—removed Admiral Jellicoe from his post of First Sea Lord because of the latter's opposition to the convoy system, which Prime Minister David Lloyd George had appointed Geddes to implement.

== Organisation ==
=== Types of convoy ===
According to John Abbatiello, there were four categories of convoy used during World War I. The first category consists of the short-distance convoys, such as those between Britain and its European allies, and between Britain and neutral countries. The commercial convoys between England and the Netherlands or Norway are examples, as are the coal convoys between England and France. The second category consists of the escorts of warships, usually troopships, such as those from the Dominions in the early stages of the war. These formed the earliest convoys, but "probably the most overlooked category". The British Grand Fleet itself could be included in this category, since it was always escorted by a destroyer screen in the North Sea and frequently by long-range Coastal and North Sea-class airships. The third category is the so-called "ocean convoys" that safeguarded transoceanic commerce. They traversed the Atlantic from the U.S. or Canada in the north, or from British or French colonial Africa or Gibraltar in the south. The fourth category is the "coastal convoys", those protecting trade and ship movements along the coast of Britain and within British home waters. Most coastal and internal sea traffic was not convoyed until mid-1918. These convoys involved the heavy use of aircraft.

=== Structure of command ===
With the success of the convoy system, the Royal Navy created a new Convoy Section and a Mercantile Movements Division at the Admiralty to work with the Ministry of Shipping and the Naval Intelligence Division to organise convoys, routings and schedules. Before this, the Norwegian convoys, coal convoys and Beef Trip convoys had often been arranged by local commanders. The Admiralty arranged the rendezvous, decided which ships would be escorted and in what order they would sail, but it left the composition of the escort itself to the Commander-in-Chief, Plymouth. The wing captain of the Southwest Air Group also received notification of the Admiralty's convoys, and provided air cover as they approached their ports. The Enemy Submarine and Direction Finding Section and the code-breakers of Room 40 cooperated to give the convoy planners knowledge of U-boat movements.

With the advent of coastal convoys, escort composition and technique fell into the hands of the district commanders-in-chief.

=== Use of aircraft ===
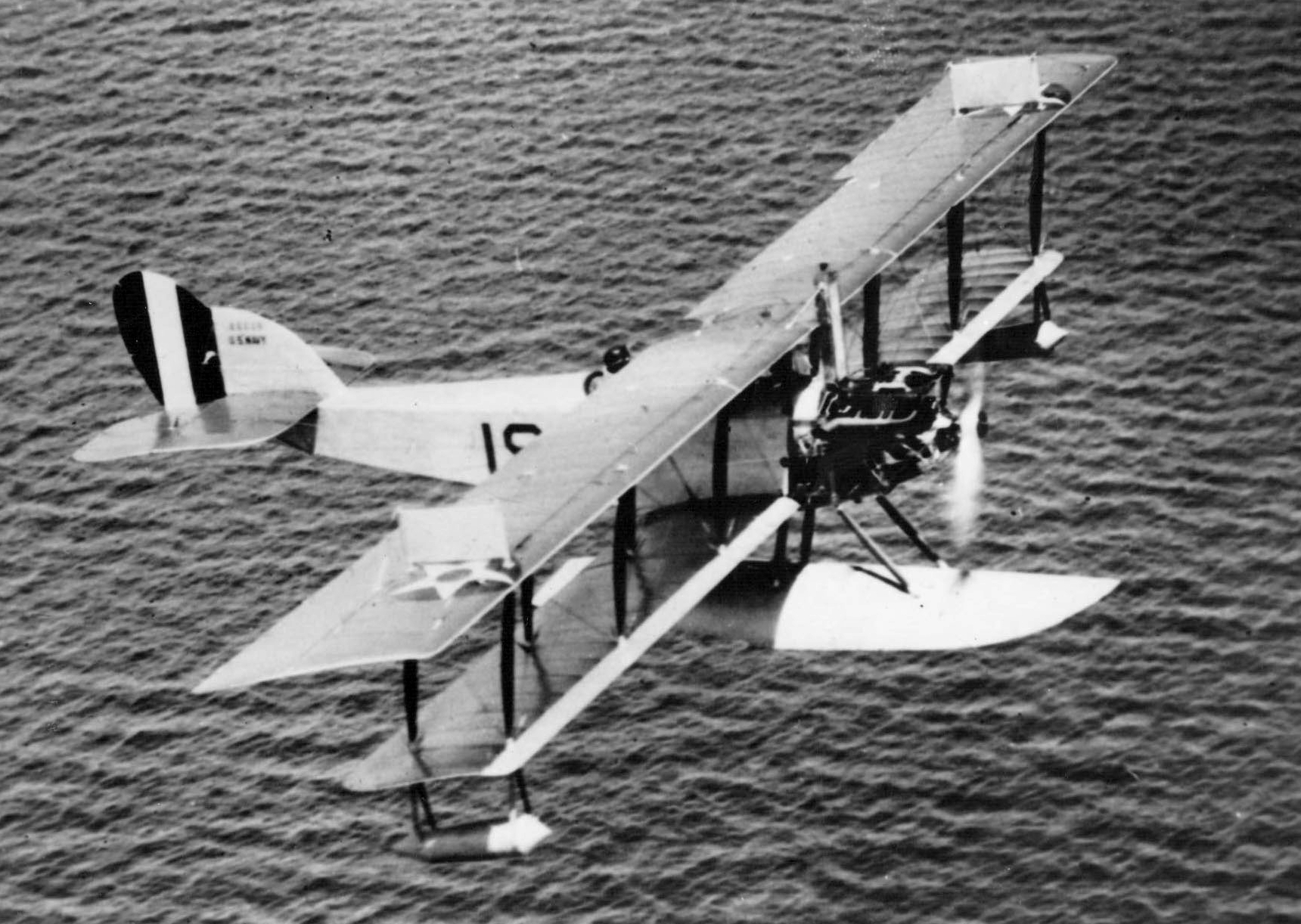
Aircraft played an important role in assisting Allied convoys against enemy activity

In April 1918, the airship NS-3 escorted a convoy for 55 hours, including patrols at night both with and without moonlight. In complete darkness the airship had to stay behind the ships and follow their stern lights. The only value in such patrols was in maximising useful daylight hours by having the airships already aloft at dawn. In July, the Antisubmarine Division and the Air Department of the Admiralty considered and rejected the use of searchlights during night, believing the airships would render themselves vulnerable to surfaced U-boats. Testing of searchlights on aircraft revealed that the bomb payload needed to be much reduced to accommodate searchlight systems. Parachute flares offered better illumination (and were less illuminating of the airships′ positions), but they weighed in at 80 pounds (36 kg) each, making them too costly to drop unless the rough position of the enemy was already known. The Admiralty restricted the use of lights on airships for recognition, emergencies and under orders from senior naval officers only.

Of the 257 ships sunk by submarines from World War I convoys, only five were lost while aircraft assisted the surface escort. On 26 December 1917, as an airship was escorting three merchantmen out of Falmouth for their rendezvous with a convoy, they were attacked three times in the space of 90 minutes, torpedoing and sinking two of the vessels and narrowly missing the third before escaping. The airship had been 7 mi (6.1 nmi; 11 km) away at the time of the incident, which was one of the last of its kind. In 1918, U-boats attacked convoys escorted by both surface ships and aircraft only six times, sinking three ships in total out of thousands. Because of the decentralised nature of the convoy system, the RNAS had no say in the composition or use of air escorts. The northeast of England led the way in the use of aircraft for short- and long-range escort duty, but shore-based aerial "hunting patrols" were widely considered a superior use of air resources. Subsequent historians have not agreed, although they have tended to overstress the actual use made of aircraft in convoy escort duty. An Admiralty staff study in 1957 concluded that the convoy was the best defence against enemy attacks on shipping, and dismissed shore-based patrols while commending the use of air support in convoying.
