= SMS Bremse =

Light cruiser of the German Imperial Navy

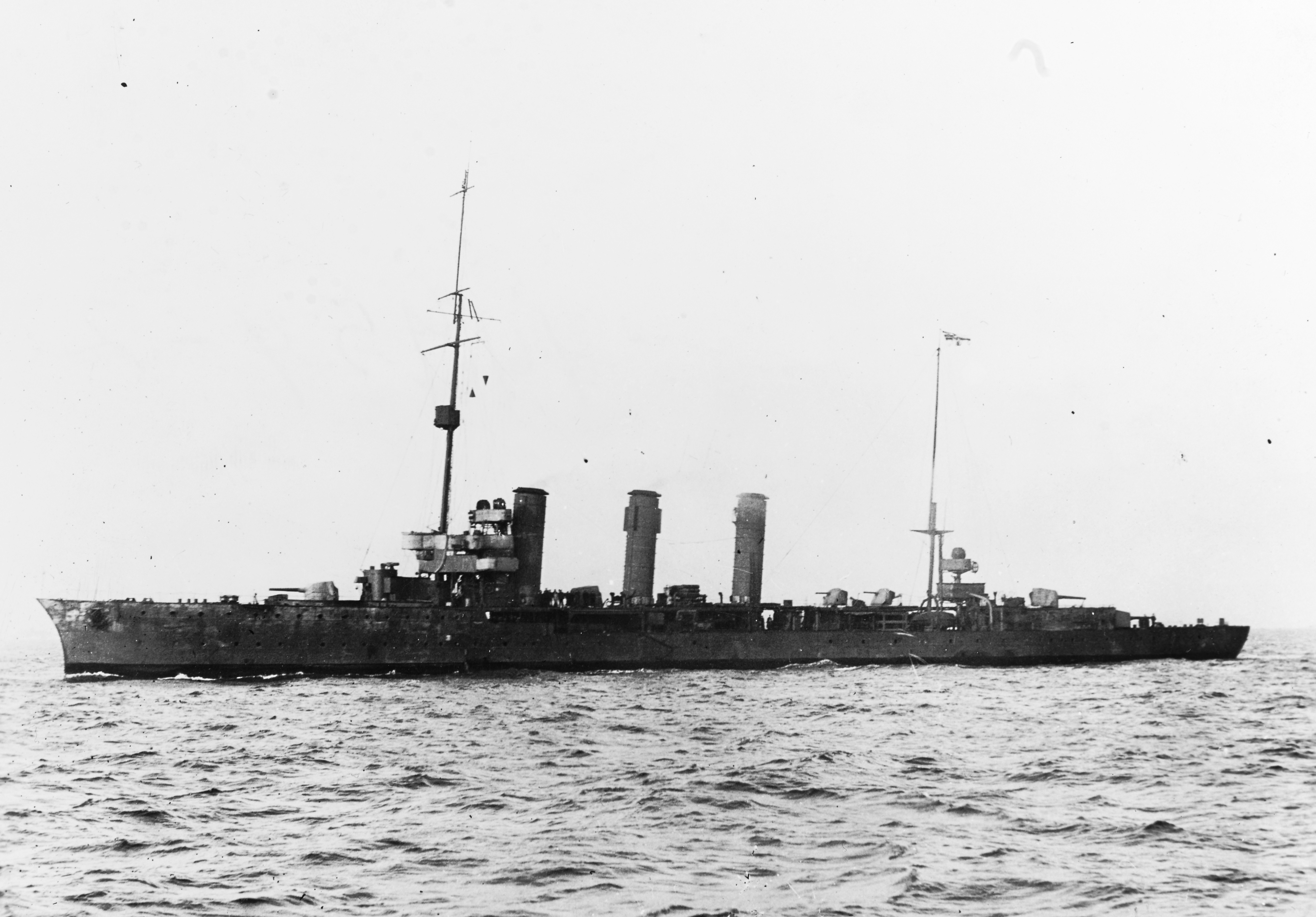
- One of the Brummer-class cruisers, probably on the way to Scapa Flow

History

German Empire
- Name: SMS Bremse
- Builder: AG Vulcan Stettin, Stettin
- Laid down: 27 April 1915
- Launched: 11 March 1916
- Commissioned: 1 July 1916
- Fate: Scuttled in Scapa Flow on 21 June 1919

General characteristics
- Class & type: Brummer-class cruiser
- Displacement: Normal: 4,385 t (4,316 long tons); Full load: 5,856 t (5,764 long tons)
- Length: 140.4 m (460 ft 8 in)
- Beam: 13.2 m (43 ft 4 in)
- Draft: 6 m (19 ft 8 in)
- Installed power: 6 × water-tube boilers; 33,000 shp (25,000 kW)
- Propulsion: 2 × screw propellers; 2 × steam turbines
- Speed: 28 knots (52 km/h; 32 mph)
- Range: 5,800 nmi (10,700 km; 6,700 mi) at 12 kn (22 km/h; 14 mph)
- Complement: 16 officers; 293 enlisted men
- Armament: 4 × 15 cm (5.9 in) SK L/45 guns; 2 × 8.8 cm (3.5 in) SK L/45 AA guns; 2 × 50 cm (19.7 in) torpedo tubes; 400 mines
- Armor: Belt: 40 mm (1.6 in); Deck: 15 mm (0.59 in); Conning tower: 100 mm (3.9 in)

SMS Bremse was a Brummer-class minelaying light cruiser of the German Kaiserliche Marine (Imperial Navy). She was laid down by AG Vulcan Stettin on 27 April 1915 and launched on 11 March 1916 at Stettin, Germany, the second of the two-ship class after her sister, SMS Brummer. She served during the First World War, operating most of the time in company with her sister. The two ships took part in an ambush on a convoy in the North Sea, where they sank two destroyers in a surprise attack, before hunting down and sinking nine merchantmen, after which they returned to port unscathed.

The Kaiserliche Marine considered sending the two ships to attack convoys in the Atlantic Ocean, but the difficulties associated with refueling at sea convinced the Germans to abandon the plan. Bremse was one of the ships interned at Scapa Flow under the terms of the armistice in November 1918. On 21 June 1919, the commander of the interned fleet, Rear Admiral Ludwig von Reuter, ordered the scuttling of the fleet. She was salvaged in 1929 by teams working for Ernest Cox, though they had to contend with large quantities of oil and the risks of fires and explosions. Having been brought back to the surface after a decade underwater, she was then scrapped.

== Design ==
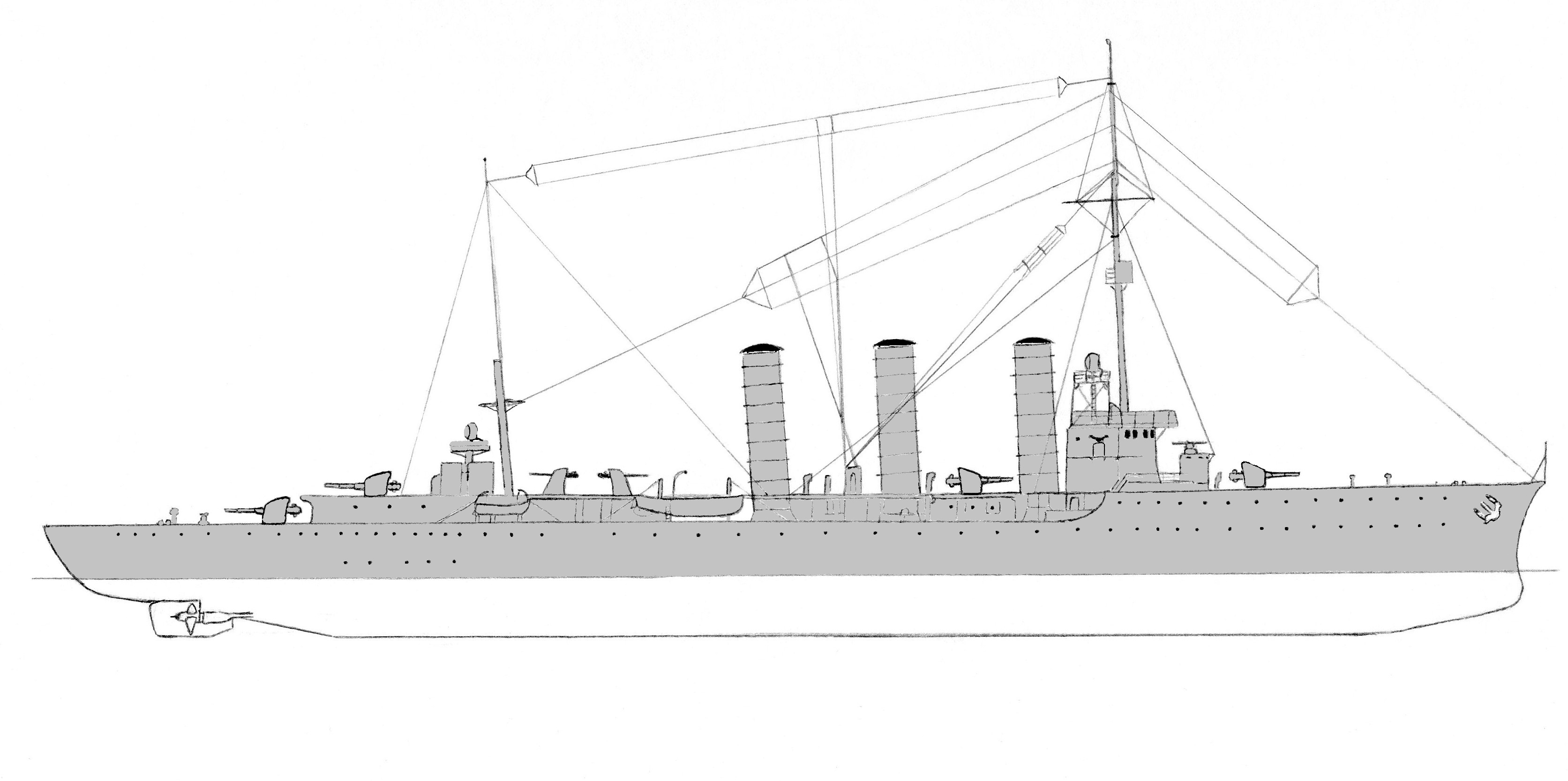
Profile drawing of Brummer

At the start of World War I in August 1914, the German firm AG Vulcan had a set of four steam turbines that had been ordered by the Imperial Russian Navy for the cruiser Svetlana. As the two countries were now at war, the German government seized the turbines and the naval command decided to build two fast, mine-laying cruisers using the engines, as the existing light cruisers were too few in number to be spared for that task.

Bremse was 140.4 meters (461 ft) long overall and had a beam of 13.2 m (43 ft) and a draft of 6 m (20 ft) forward. She displaced 4,385 t (4,316 long tons) as designed and up to 5,856 t (5,764 long tons; 6,455 short tons) at full load. Her propulsion system consisted of two sets of steam turbines powered by two coal-fired and four oil-fired Marine-type water-tube boilers, which were ducted into three funnels. These provided a top speed of 28 knots (52 km/h; 32 mph) and a range of 5,800 nautical miles (10,700 km; 6,700 mi) at 12 kn (22 km/h; 14 mph). In service however, the ship reached 34 kn (63 km/h; 39 mph).

The ship was armed with four 15 cm (5.9 in) SK L/45 guns in single pedestal mounts; two were arranged forward on the centerline, forward and aft of the conning tower, and two were placed in a superfiring pair aft. These guns fired a 45.3-pound (20.5 kg) shell at a muzzle velocity of 840 meters per second (2,800 ft/s). The guns had a maximum elevation of 30 degrees, which allowed them to engage targets out to 17,600 m (57,700 ft). They were supplied with 600 rounds of ammunition, for 150 shells per gun. Brummer also carried two 8.8 cm (3.5 in) SK L/45 anti-aircraft guns mounted on the centerline astern of the funnels. She was also equipped with a pair of 50 cm (20 in) torpedo tubes with four torpedoes in a swivel mount amidships. Designed as a minelayer, she carried 400 mines. The ship was protected by a waterline armored belt that was 40 mm (1.6 in) thick amidships. The conning tower had 100 mm (3.9 in) thick sides, and the deck was covered with 15 mm (0.59 in) thick armor plate.

== Service history ==
Named for the armored gunboat of the same name built in the 1880s, Bremse was ordered under the contract name D, (Note: German warships were ordered under provisional names. Additions to the fleet were given a single letter; ships intended to replace older or lost vessels were ordered as "Ersatz (name of the ship to be replaced)".) and laid down at the AG Vulcan shipyard in Stettin on 27 April 1915. She was launched on 11 March 1916, after which fitting-out work commenced. Completed in less than four months, she was commissioned into active service on 1 July 1916 to begin sea trials. These were completed by mid-October, at which point she was assigned to II Scouting Group, though she remained in the unit only briefly. Over the period 11–20 October 1916, Bremse and Brummer served with the High Seas Fleet for a major sweep into the North Sea. The operation led to a brief action on 19 October, during which a British submarine torpedoed the cruiser München. The failure of the operation (coupled with the action of 19 August 1916) convinced the German naval command to abandon its aggressive fleet strategy.

On 1 December, Bremse was transferred to IV Scouting Group. The ships of the unit sortied into the North Sea at the end of the month for a sweep toward Fisher Bank that ended without contact with British warships. On 10 January 1917, the two ships laid a minefield off Norderney that consisted of some 300 mines. between 1 March and 13 May, she took part in local defensive operations in the German Bight, supporting minesweepers. During this period, they were based in Emden and Wilhelmshaven. On 5 September, Bremse's anti-aircraft gunners engaged British fighters that had attacked the zeppelin L 44. Admiral Reinhard Scheer, the commander of the High Seas Fleet, came aboard Bremse in early October for a voyage to Libau.

=== Action off Lerwick ===
Map of the North Sea

Their first major offensive operation was an attack on a British convoy in October 1917. Britain had agreed to ship 250,000 t (246,000 long tons; 276,000 short tons) tons of coal per month to Norway, and a regular stream of convoys carrying shipments of coal was crossing the North Sea by late 1917. These were usually weakly escorted by only a couple of destroyers and armed trawlers. Attempts to interdict them with U-boats had to that point been ineffective, so Scheer decided to deploy a surface force to carry out a surprise attack to supplement the U-boat campaign. In addition to damaging British shipping, Scheer sought to divert escorts from the Atlantic theater, where his U-boats were concentrated. As a further objective, the raid was intended to distract British attention from Operation Albion, which saw much of the High Seas Fleet detached into the Baltic Sea to attack the islands in the Gulf of Riga. Bremse, commanded by Fregattenkapitän Westerkamp, and Brummer, commanded by Fregattenkapitän Leonhardi, were selected for the first such operation. Their high speed and large radius of action, coupled with their resemblance to British light cruisers, made them suited to the task. In preparation for the raid, their crews painted the ships dark gray to further camouflage them as British vessels.

In the early hours of 17 October, the two cruisers received a report from a patrolling zeppelin that had located one of the convoys. Half an hour after dawn, Brummer and Bremse attacked a westbound convoy about 70 nautical miles (130 km; 81 mi) east of Lerwick. The convoy consisted of twelve merchantmen and was escorted by the destroyers HMS Strongbow and Mary Rose and a pair of armed trawlers which had departed from Bergen. At dawn lookouts aboard Stronghold reported two unidentified ships closing on the convoy. Mistaking them for British cruisers Strongbow flashed recognition signals, but was suddenly fired upon at a range of 2,700 m (8,900 ft) by a barrage of 15 cm shells from Bremse. Mary Rose tried to come to her assistance but was also hit by fire from Brummer; both ships were quickly sunk. Brummer and Bremse then turned their attention to the convoy, hunting down and sinking nine of the merchantmen, before returning to port. One of the armed trawlers, the Elise, was fired on by Bremse while attempting to pick up survivors. None of the ships were able to send a wireless report, and despite having a squadron of sixteen light cruisers at sea to the south of the convoy, the British did not learn of the attack until 16:00, when it was too late. Admiral David Beatty said of the action that 'luck was against us.' The success of the two cruisers promoted the British to escort future convoys with a detached squadron of battleships from the Grand Fleet.

=== Later career ===
In the aftermath of the Lerwick raid, the Admiralstab considered sending Brummer and Bremse on a commerce raiding mission into the Atlantic. They were to operate off the Azores in concert with an oiler. The central Atlantic was out of the normal range of the U-boats, and convoys were therefore lightly defended in the area. The Admiralstab canceled the plan, however, after it was determined that refueling at sea would be too difficult. Another problem was the tendency of the two ships to emit clouds of red sparks when steaming at speeds over 20 kn (37 km/h; 23 mph); this would hamper their ability to evade Allied ships at night. Nevertheless, the preliminary planning carried out formed the basis for later work that resulted in the deployment of long-range surface raiders during World War II. In March 1918, Bremse and several other cruisers and torpedo boats carried out a raid into the Skagerrak and Kattegat between Denmark and Norway in an unsuccessful attempt to disrupt British merchant shipping in the area. On 2 April, Bremse laid a minefield consisting of 304 mines in the North Sea. She laid another 150 mines in the same area on 11 April.

The British reaction to the raid off Lerwick presented the Germans with opportunity for which they had been waiting the entire war: a portion of the numerically stronger Grand Fleet was separated and could be isolated and destroyed. Admiral Franz von Hipper planned the operation: I Scouting Group, along with light cruisers and destroyers, would attack one of the large convoys while the rest of the High Seas Fleet would stand by, ready to attack the British battle squadron when it intervened. At 05:00 on 23 April 1918, the German fleet—including Bremse—departed from the Schillig roadstead. Hipper, aboard the battleship Baden, ordered wireless transmissions be kept to a minimum, to prevent radio intercepts by British intelligence. During the voyage north, the battlecruiser Moltke suffered a machinery breakdown, and she had to be towed back to port. Despite this setback, Hipper continued northward. By 14:00, Hipper's force had crossed the convoy route several times but had found nothing. At 14:10, Hipper turned his ships southward. By 18:37, the German fleet had made it back to the defensive minefields surrounding their bases. It was later discovered that the convoy had left port a day later than expected by the German planning staff.

On 11 May, Bremse laid another minefield in the North Sea with 400 mines. Three days later, she laid another 420 mines in the North Sea. Bremse was to have been part of the final sortie of the High Seas Fleet at the end of October 1918, during which she would have laid an offensive minefield to damage British ships before a major fleet engagement. But the operation was cancelled due to the mutiny of the High Seas Fleet that began in Wilhelmshaven. In an attempt to suppress the mutiny, the fleet was dispersed, and Bremse and the rest of IV Scouting Group were sent to Kiel. Already on 4 November, they were moved again and while the ships were still at sea, the unit was disbanded. Bremse was initially sent to Flensburg, but she soon left to join Brummer at Swinemünde, where she was placed out of commission.

=== Internment and scuttling ===
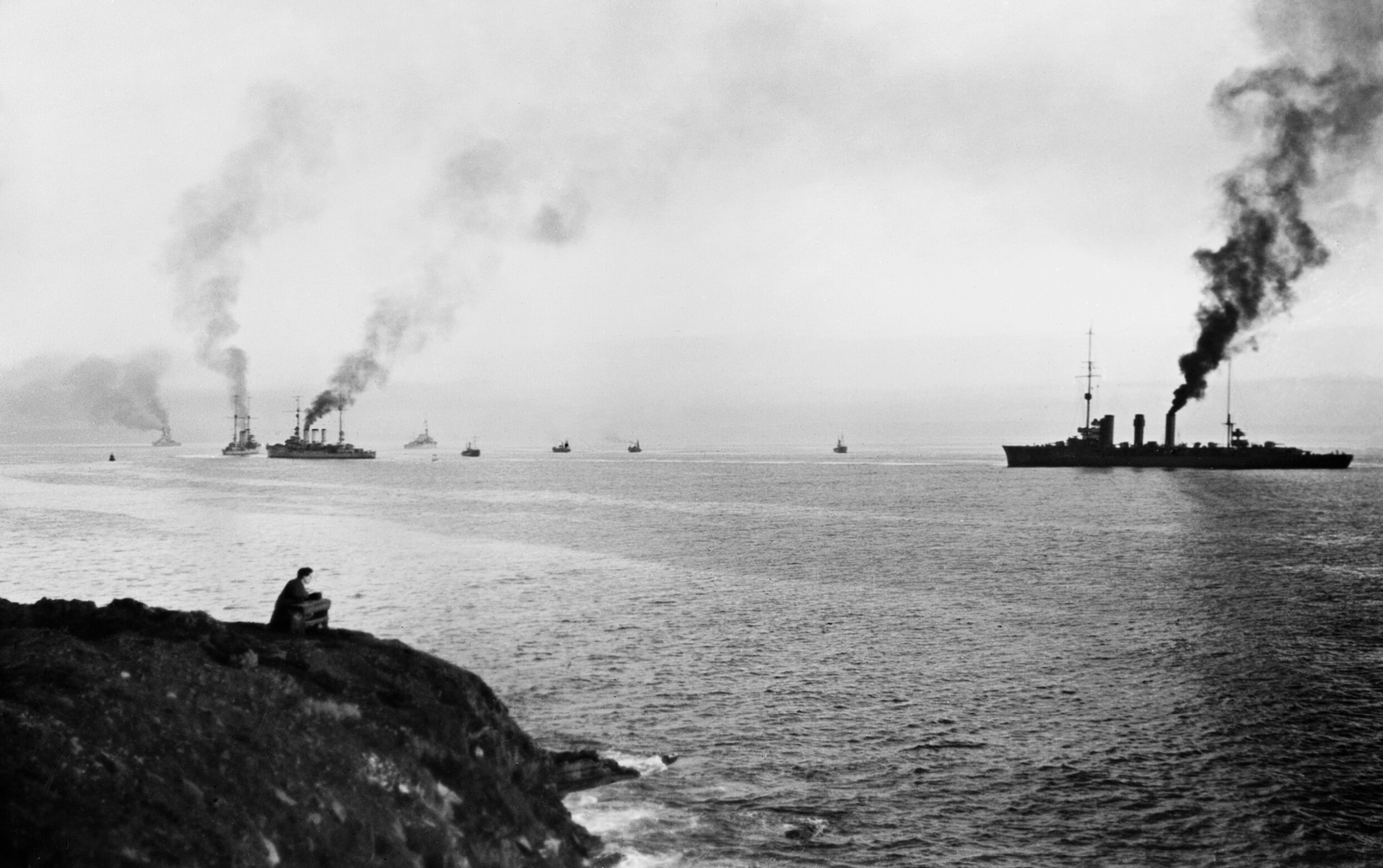
Ships of the German High Seas Fleet sailing to be interned. Visible are SMS Emden, SMS Frankfurt, and Bremse

Along with the most modern units of the High Seas Fleet, Brummer and Bremse were included in the ships specified for internment at Scapa Flow by the victorious Allied powers. The ships steamed out of Germany on 21 November 1918 in single file, commanded by Rear Admiral Ludwig von Reuter. They were met at sea by a combined fleet of 370 British, American, and French warships. The fleet arrived in the Firth of Forth later that day, and between 25 and 27 November, they were escorted to Scapa Flow. Upon arrival, all wireless equipment was removed from the ships and the breech blocks of their heavy guns were removed to prevent their use. Crews were reduced to minimum levels, with the excess men being carried home to Germany in early December.

The fleet remained in captivity during the negotiations that ultimately produced the Treaty of Versailles. Reuter believed that the British intended to seize the German ships on 21 June 1919, which was the deadline for Germany to have signed the peace treaty. Unaware that the deadline had been extended to the 23rd, Reuter ordered the ships to be sunk at the next opportunity. On the morning of 21 June, the British fleet left Scapa Flow to conduct training maneuvers, and at 11:20 Reuter transmitted the order to his ships. An armed British naval party had attempted to board Bremse and close her bottom valves, but found that they were already below the rising waterline. Instead they blasted off her anchor chains and she was taken in tow by a tug and the destroyer HMS Venetia, in an attempt to beach her before she sank. They managed to run her bow onto the beach, south of Cava, but the steeply sloping approach meant that her stern settled in deeper water, and she rolled over and sank in 75 ft (23 m) of water at 14:30, leaving her bow visible at low tide.

== Salvage ==
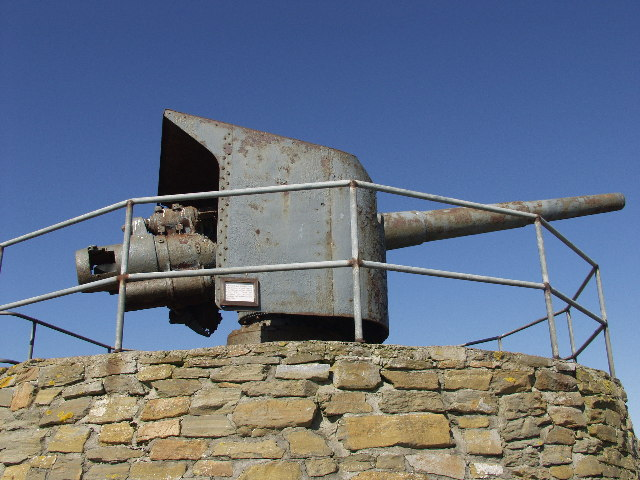
15 cm naval gun salvaged from Bremse and displayed at Scapa Flow

Though the Admiralty arranged for some of the ships to be salvaged, most were left at the bottom of the sound until entrepreneur Ernest Cox bought the salvage rights and began to raise the remaining ships in the early 1920s. Bremse presented particular challenges. She had come to rest perched precariously on a rock, which sloped away dramatically, causing fears that she might slip off and sink in deeper water. Cox's salvage team sealed her bulkheads and divided the hull into watertight compartments. The hull was patched up and an airlock fitted, but the team ran into difficulties with the large amount of oil which covered the wreck, more than had been found in any other of the ships salvaged previously. A three-man team using oxyacetylene torches ignited some oil, causing an explosion. The men escaped without serious injuries, and thereafter small explosions and fires were common over the two months it took to prepare the ship, though no one was injured.

By July 1929 the last of the superstructure had been cleared, and Bremse was turned upside down using techniques developed on salvaging some of the destroyers. Compressors were then used to pump air into the hull and bring her to the surface, while she was supported by 9-inch wires attached to two floating docks anchored on her port shoreward side. The salvage teams had almost raised her when she suddenly toppled onto her side and then heeled over gradually during the night, settling onto the rocks inshore.

It was thought that the failure had been caused by there being too much remaining superstructure, and attempts were made to clean out the large quantity of oil that had spilled out during the attempt to raise her. The decision was made to burn off the oil, but the fire spread and had to be brought back under control. She was again patched up and pumped with air, breaking the surface on 29 November. Bremse was considered too unsafe to tow to Rosyth for scrapping, as had been done with the other ships Cox had salvaged, and instead she was taken to Lyness on the following day. The ship-breaking work lasted until May 1931.
