= SMS Brummer =

Light cruiser of the German Imperial Navy

Coordinates: 58.8971°N 3.1539°W

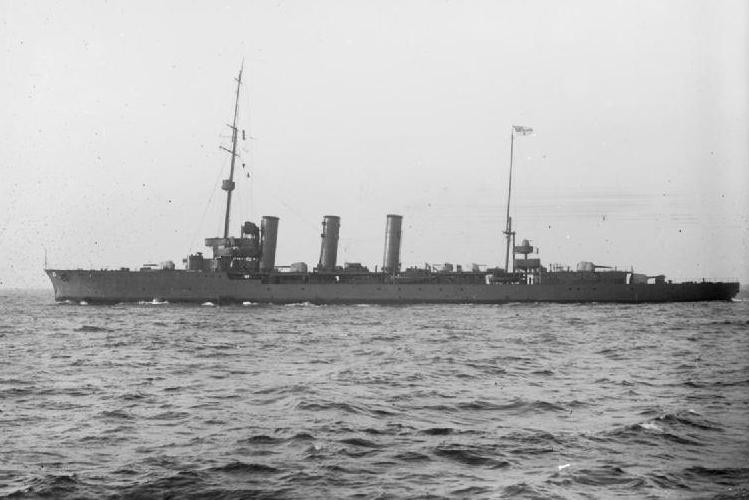
- SMS Brummer underway

History

German Empire
- Name: Brummer
- Builder: AG Vulcan, Stettin
- Laid down: 24 April 1915
- Launched: 11 December 1915
- Commissioned: 2 April 1916
- Fate: Scuttled in Scapa Flow on 21 June 1919

General characteristics
- Class & type: Brummer-class cruiser
- Displacement: Normal: 4,385 t (4,316 long tons); Full load: 5,856 t (5,764 long tons)
- Length: 140.4 m (460 ft 8 in)
- Beam: 13.2 m (43 ft 4 in)
- Draft: 6 m (19 ft 8 in)
- Installed power: 6 × water-tube boilers; 33,000 shp (25,000 kW)
- Propulsion: 2 × screw propellers; 2 × AEG-Vulcan steam turbines
- Speed: 28 knots (52 km/h; 32 mph)
- Range: 5,800 nmi (10,700 km; 6,700 mi) at 12 kn (22 km/h; 14 mph)
- Complement: 16 officers; 293 enlisted men
- Armament: 4 × 15 cm SK L/45 guns; 2 × 8.8 cm (3.5 in) SK L/45 AA guns; 2 × 50 cm (19.7 in) torpedo tubes; 400 mines
- Armor: Belt: 40 mm (1.6 in); Deck: 15 mm (0.59 in); Conning tower: 100 mm (3.9 in)

SMS Brummer was a minelaying light cruiser of the German Kaiserliche Marine; she was the lead ship of her class. Her sister ship was Bremse. Brummer was laid down at AG Vulcan's shipyard in Stettin, Germany, on 24 April 1915 and launched on 11 December 1915 and completed on 2 April 1916. Armed with a main battery of four 15-centimeter (5.9 in) guns in single mounts, she carried 400 mines.

Despite being designed as a minelayer, the German Navy never operated her as such. She and her sister were used to raid a British convoy to Norway in October 1917. The two cruisers sank two escorting destroyers and nine of the twelve merchant ships of the convoy. The Kaiserliche Marine considered sending the two ships to attack convoys in the Atlantic Ocean, but the difficulties associated with refueling at sea convinced the Germans to abandon the plan. Brummer was included in the list of ships interned at Scapa Flow following the Armistice. On 21 June 1919, the commander of the interned fleet, Rear Admiral Ludwig von Reuter, ordered the scuttling of the fleet. Brummer was successfully scuttled, and unlike most of the other wrecks, she was never raised for scrapping.

== Design ==
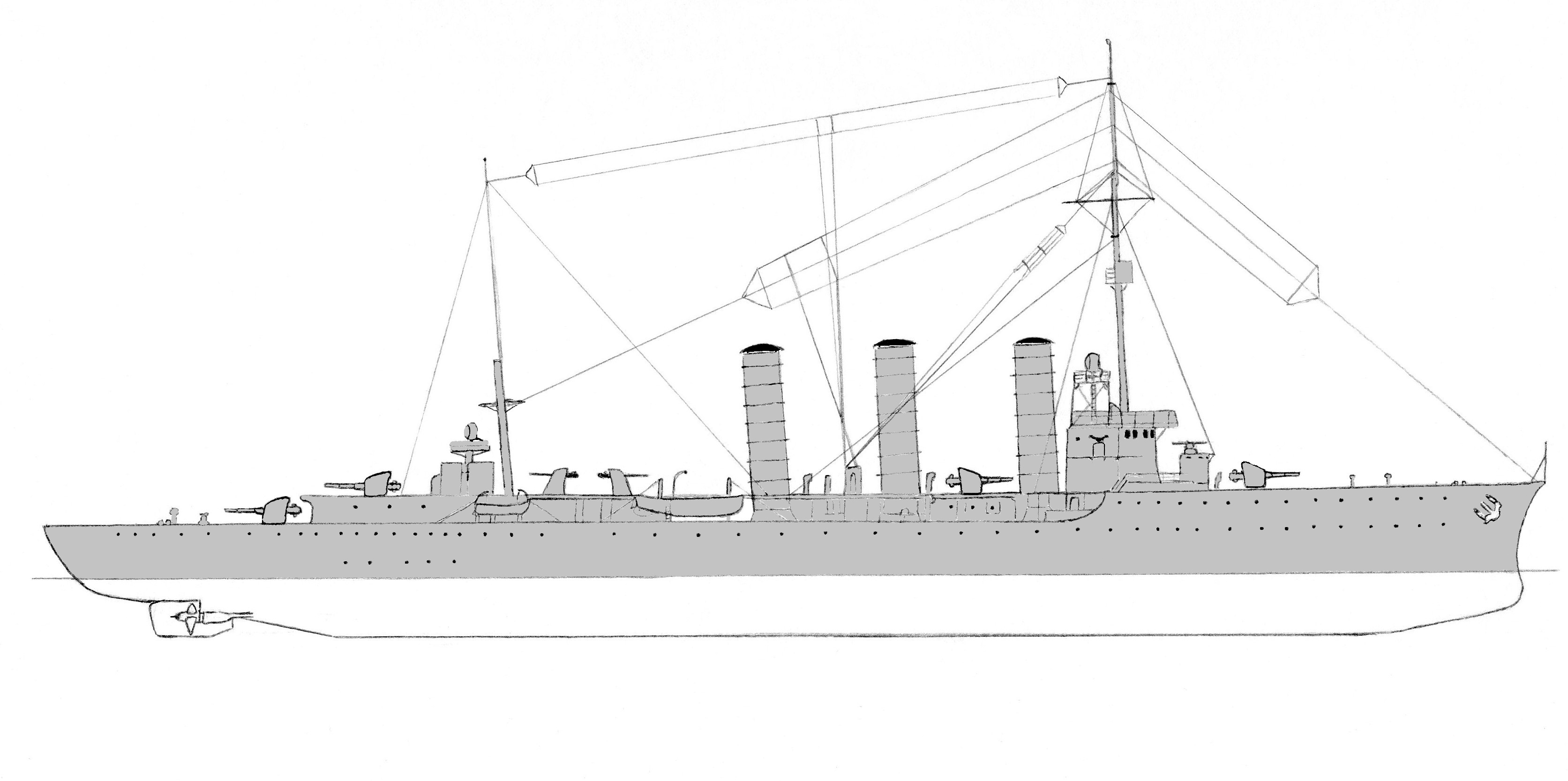
Profile drawing of Brummer

At the start of World War I in August 1914, the German firm AG Vulcan had a set of four steam turbines that had been ordered by the Imperial Russian Navy for the cruiser Svetlana. As the two countries were now at war, the German government seized the turbines and the naval command decided to build two fast, mine-laying cruisers using the engines, as the existing light cruisers were too few in number to be spared for that task.

Brummer was 140.4 meters (461 ft) long overall and had a beam of 13.2 m (43 ft) and a draft of 6 m (20 ft) forward. She displaced 4,385 t (4,316 long tons) as designed and up to 5,856 t (5,764 long tons; 6,455 short tons) at full load. Her propulsion system consisted of two sets of 33,000-shaft-horsepower (25,000 kW) steam turbines powered by two coal-fired and four oil-fired Marine-type water-tube boilers, which were ducted into three funnels. These provided a top speed of 28 kn (52 km/h; 32 mph) and a range of 5,800 nautical miles (10,700 km; 6,700 mi) at 12 kn (22 km/h; 14 mph). In service however, the ship reached 34 kn (63 km/h; 39 mph).

The ship was armed with four 15 cm (5.9 in) SK L/45 guns in single pedestal mounts; two were arranged forward on the centerline, forward and aft of the conning tower, and two were placed in a superfiring pair aft. These guns fired a 45.3-pound (20.5 kg) shell at a muzzle velocity of 840 meters per second (2,800 ft/s). The guns had a maximum elevation of 30 degrees, which allowed them to engage targets out to 17,600 m (57,700 ft). They were supplied with 600 rounds of ammunition, for 150 shells per gun. Brummer also carried two 8.8 cm (3.5 in) SK L/45 anti-aircraft guns mounted on the centerline astern of the funnels. She was also equipped with a pair of 50 cm (19.7 in) torpedo tubes with four torpedoes in a swivel mount amidships. Designed as a minelayer, she carried 400 mines. The ship was protected by a waterline armored belt that was 40 mm (1.6 in) thick amidships. The conning tower had 100 mm (3.9 in) thick sides, and the deck was covered with 15 mm (0.59 in) thick armor plate.

== Service history ==
Brummer, named after the armored gunboat of the same name that had been built in the 1880s, was ordered under the contract name C, (Note: German warships were ordered under provisional names. Additions to the fleet were given a single letter; ships intended to replace older or lost vessels were ordered as "Ersatz (name of the ship to be replaced)".) and was laid down at the AG Vulcan shipyard in Stettin on 24 April 1915. She was launched on 11 December 1915, after which fitting-out work commenced. While the ship was under construction, the Germans attempted to conceal her resemblance to British cruisers by placing sheet metal over her bow to make it seem as though she had the standard German straight stem. Completed in less than four months, she was commissioned into the High Seas Fleet on 2 April 1916. Brummer was ready for service with the fleet by May 1916, though she did not steam with the rest of the High Seas Fleet for the Battle of Jutland at the end of the month. She soon thereafter joined II Scouting Group, which had been badly weakened by losses at the Battle of Jutland.

Over the period 11–20 October 1916, Brummer and Bremse served with the High Seas Fleet for a major sweep into the North Sea. The operation led to a brief action on 19 October, during which a British submarine torpedoed the cruiser München. The failure of the operation (coupled with the action of 19 August 1916) convinced the German naval command to abandon its aggressive fleet strategy. Toward the end of 1916, she was transferred to IV Scouting Group. She laid a minefield between Norderney and Helgoland on 10 January 1917. For much of the rest of the year, she took part in local defensive operations in the German Bight, supporting minesweepers. During this period, she was based alternatively at Emden and Wilhelmshaven.

=== Action off Lerwick ===
Map of the North Sea

By late 1917, Britain had agreed to ship 250,000 t (246,000 long tons; 276,000 short tons) tons of coal per month to Norway, and a regular stream of convoys carrying shipments of coal was crossing the North Sea by late 1917. These were usually weakly escorted by only a couple of destroyers and armed trawlers. Attempts to interdict them with U-boats had to that point been ineffective, so Admiral Reinhard Scheer, the chief of the Admiralstab, decided to deploy a surface force to carry out a surprise attack to supplement the U-boat campaign. In addition to damaging British shipping, Scheer sought to divert escorts from the Atlantic theater, where his U-boats were concentrated. As a further objective, the raid was intended to distract British attention from Operation Albion, which saw much of the High Seas Fleet detached into the Baltic Sea to attack the islands in the Gulf of Riga. Brummer, commanded by Fregattenkapitän (FK—Frigate Captain) Leonhardi, and Bremse, commanded by FK Westerkamp, were selected for the first such operation. Their high speed and large radius of action, coupled with their resemblance to British light cruisers, made them suited to the task. In preparation for the raid, their crews painted the ships dark gray to further camouflage them as British vessels.

In the early hours of 17 October, the two cruisers received a report from a patrolling zeppelin that had located one of the convoys. Half an hour after dawn, Brummer and Bremse attacked the convoy about 70 nautical miles (130 km; 81 mi) east of Lerwick. The convoy consisted of twelve merchantmen and was escorted by the destroyers HMS Strongbow and Mary Rose and a pair of armed trawlers. The German ruse worked, and the British destroyers initially thought they were friendly ships. They flashed recognition signals until the Germans opened fire at a range of 2,700 m (8,900 ft). Strongbow was quickly destroyed by the fire of Bremse, and as Mary Rose rushed to engage, she too was sunk by Brummer. The Germans then quickly sank nine of the merchant vessels, though the two trawlers and three merchant ships managed to escape. None of the ships were able to send a wireless report, and despite having a squadron of sixteen light cruisers at sea to the south of the convoy, the British did not learn of the attack until 16:00, when it was too late. Kaiser Wilhelm II celebrated the results of the attack with champagne. For their part, the British responded by escorting future convoys with a detached squadron of battleships from the Grand Fleet.

=== Later operations ===
In the aftermath of the battle off Lerwick, the Admiralstab considered sending Brummer and Bremse on a commerce raiding mission into the Atlantic. They were to operate off the Azores in concert with an oiler. The central Atlantic was out of the normal range of the U-boats, and convoys were therefore lightly defended in the area. The Admiralstab canceled the plan, however, after it was determined that refueling at sea would be too difficult. Another problem was the tendency of the two ships to emit clouds of red sparks when steaming at speeds over 20 kn (37 km/h; 23 mph); this would hamper evading Allied ships at night. Nevertheless, the preliminary planning carried out formed the basis for later work that resulted in the deployment of long-range surface raiders during World War II.

In November, Brummer joined the light cruiser Stralsund and several torpedo boats for a sweep out to the Dogger Bank, but they encountered no British vessels. That month, FK Hans Quaet-Faslem took command of the ship; he only remained aboard for a month, before he was replaced by FK Edmund Schulz. The success of the two ships in the action off Lerwick led the British to commit heavier escorts to the convoys to Norway by early 1918, and in April, Scheer attempted to intercept one of these convoys with the entire High Seas Fleet, including Brummer, though this ended without success. Brummer laid a defensive minefield in the German Bight in June 1918 over the course of two separate operations, first alone and the second assisted by the light cruiser Strassburg. In August, Schulz was relieved by Korvettenkapitän (Corvette Captain) Theodor von Gorrissen.

Brummer was to have been part of the final sortie of the High Seas Fleet at the end of October 1918, during which she would have laid an offensive minefield to damage British ships before a major fleet engagement. But the operation was cancelled due to the mutiny of the High Seas Fleet that began in Wilhelmshaven. In an attempt to suppress the mutiny, the fleet was dispersed, and Brummer and the rest of IV Scouting Group were sent to Kiel. Already on 4 November, they were moved again and while the ships were still at sea, the unit was disbanded. Brummer and Strassburg were initially sent to Sonderburg, but on 6 November, Brummer left to join Bremse at Swinemünde. The local soldatenrat (soldier's council) ordered Brummer to return to Kiel, but Gorrissen refused and instead placed his ship out of commission on 7 November.

=== Fate ===
Along with the most modern units of the High Seas Fleet, Brummer and Bremse were included in the ships specified for internment at Scapa Flow by the victorious Allied powers in the terms of the armistice with Germany that ended the fighting. The ships steamed out of Germany on 21 November 1918 in single file, commanded by Rear Admiral Ludwig von Reuter. They were met at sea by a combined fleet of 370 British, American, and French warships. The fleet arrived in the Firth of Forth later that day, and between 25 and 27 November, they were escorted to Scapa Flow. Upon arrival, all wireless equipment was removed from the ships and the breech blocks of their heavy guns were removed to prevent their use. Crews were reduced to minimum levels, with the excess men being carried home to Germany in early December.

The fleet remained in captivity during the negotiations that ultimately produced the Treaty of Versailles. Reuter believed that the British intended to seize the German ships on 21 June 1919, which was the deadline for Germany to have signed the peace treaty. Unaware that the deadline had been extended to the 23rd, Reuter ordered the ships to be sunk at the next opportunity. On the morning of 21 June, the British fleet left Scapa Flow to conduct training maneuvers, and at 11:20 Reuter transmitted the order to his ships. Brummer sank at 13:05; she was never raised for scrapping and remains on the bottom of Scapa Flow.

The salvage rights to the wreck passed through various hands between 1962 and 1981, during which time parts of the ship were removed by several different salvage companies. Ownership of the wreck was transferred back to the Ministry of Defence in 1981, and after salvage rights expired on 17 November 1985, the wreck was sold to the Orkney Islands Council on 3 November 1986 for the nominal sum of 1 pound. The wreck was then declared a scheduled monument on 23 May 2001. In 2017, marine archaeologists from the Orkney Research Center for Archaeology conducted extensive surveys of Brummer and nine other wrecks in the area, including six other German and three British warships. The archaeologists mapped the wrecks with sonar and examined them with remotely operated underwater vehicles as part of an effort to determine how the wrecks are deteriorating. Her wreck lies at 36 m (118 ft) and remains a popular site for recreational scuba divers.
