= HMS Tetrarch (1917) =

British R-Class destroyer

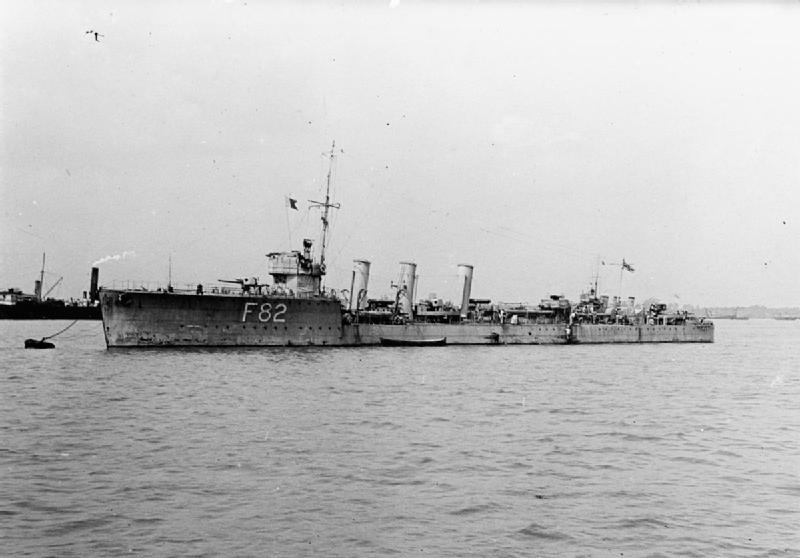
- Sister ship HMS Thisbe

History

United Kingdom
- Name: HMS Tetrarch
- Ordered: March 1916
- Builder: Harland & Wolff, Govan
- Laid down: 26 July 1916
- Launched: 20 April 1917
- Completed: 2 June 1917
- Out of service: 28 July 1934
- Fate: Sold to be broken up

General characteristics
- Class & type: R-class destroyer
- Displacement: 975 long tons (991 t) (normal); 1,173 long tons (1,192 t) (deep load)
- Length: 265 ft (81 m) (p.p.)
- Beam: 26 ft 9 in (8 m)
- Draught: 9 ft (3 m)
- Installed power: 3 Yarrow boilers, 27,000 shp (20,000 kW)
- Propulsion: 2 geared Brown-Curtis steam turbines, 2 shafts
- Speed: 36 knots (67 km/h; 41 mph)
- Range: 3,450 nmi (6,390 km; 3,970 mi) at 15 knots (28 km/h; 17 mph)
- Complement: 82
- Armament: 3 × single 4 in (102 mm) guns; 1 × single 2-pdr 40 mm (2 in) AA gun; 2 × twin 21 in (533 mm) torpedo tubes

HMS Tetrarch was an R-class destroyer that served in the Royal Navy during the First World War. The R class were an improvement on the previous M class with geared steam turbines to improve efficiency. Launched in 1917, Tetrarch served with the Tenth Destroyer Flotilla of the Harwich Force. The destroyer took part in the First Ostend Raid in 1918 alongside the monitors Erebus and Terror. Later that year, the vessel escorted five destroyers each towing an aircraft on a lighter to attack German shipping off Heligoland. After the Armistice, the ship was initially placed in reserve at Devonport but soon joined the Atlantic Fleet, with a particular role as an escort to the aircraft carriers Courageous and Furious. As well as exercises with the fleet in the Mediterranean Sea and off the coast of Scotland, the ship undertook visits to seaside resorts in England and Wales. Following a decision to replace older destroyers in the Royal Navy, Tetrarch was retired in 1934 and sold to be broken up.

== Design and development ==
Tetrarch was one of 23 R-class destroyers ordered by the British Admiralty in March 1916 as part of the Seventh War Programme during the First World War. The design was generally similar to the preceding M class, but differed in having geared steam turbines, giving greater fuel efficiency, the aft gun mounted on a raised platform, a higher forecastle for better seakeeping and a larger and a more robust bridge structure.

The destroyer had a length of 265 feet (81 m) between perpendiculars and 276 feet (84 m) overall, a beam of 26 feet 9 inches (8 m) and a draught of 9 feet (3 m). Displacement was 975 long tons (991 t) normal and 1,173 long tons (1,192 t) deep load. Power was provided by three Yarrow boilers feeding two Brown-Curtis geared turbines rated at 27,000 shaft horsepower (20,000 kW) and driving two shafts, to give a design speed of 36 knots (67 km/h; 41 mph). Three funnels were fitted. A total of 296 long tons (301 t) of fuel oil was carried, which gave a design range of 3,450 nautical miles (6,390 km; 3,970 mi) at 15 knots (28 km/h; 17 mph). The ship had a complement of 82 officers and ratings.

Armament consisted of three single QF 4 in (102 mm) Mk IV guns on the ship's centreline, with one on the forecastle, one aft on a raised platform and one between the second and third funnels. A single 2-pounder 40 mm (2 in) "pom-pom" anti-aircraft gun was carried, while torpedo armament consisted of two twin mounts for 21 in (533 mm) torpedoes. The destroyer was later fitted with racks and storage for depth charges. The number of depth charges available increased in service. By 1918, the vessel was carrying between 30 and 50 depth charges.

== Construction and career ==
Laid down by Harland & Wolff at their shipyard in Govan on 26 July 1916, Tetrarch was launched on 20 April the following year and completed on 2 June. The destroyer was the first ship in Royal Navy service to carry the name. On commissioning, Tetrarch was deployed with the Tenth Destroyer Flotilla of the Harwich Force.

Tetrarch was allocated to anti-submarine warfare. Between 16 and 17 October 1917, the destroyer was called upon to be part of a large force of 84 warships sent out to search for a German fleet based around a minelayer, although Tetrarch saw no action. The destroyer joined sister ship Tempest in the First Ostend Raid, accompanying monitors Erebus and Terror that led the attack on 23 April 1918. The action also included the sinking of blockships to impede the flow of German submarines leaving the port. On 24 April, the flotilla took part in the Royal Navy's engagement with one of the final sorties of the German High Seas Fleet during the First World War, although the two fleets did not actually meet and the destroyer returned unharmed. On 10 August, Tetrarch joined a fleet of four light cruisers and seven destroyers to escorted five destroyers each towing an aircraft on a lighter to sail for Heligoland and attack German shipping. Initially, the assignment was not a success as the aircraft failed to take off and the boats were all sunk or interned, but subsequently one of the aircraft shot down Zeppelin LZ 100.

After the Armistice of 11 November 1918 that ended the war, the Royal Navy returned to a peacetime level of strength and both the number of ships and personnel needed to be reduced to save money. Tetrarch was placed in reserve at Devonport. This did not last long and by January 1921 the vessel was operating as part of the local defence based at Queenstown. Shortly afterwards, the destroyer joined the Atlantic Fleet. On 6 July 1926, Tetrarch joined the Fifth Destroyer Flotilla in escorting the aircraft carrier Furious from Plymouth to Torbay. On 28 January the following year, the destroyer joined the aircraft carrier and a much larger fleet that included the battleship Revenge on a deployment to Gibraltar. The ship arrived on 10 March and then undertook exercises with the combined Atlantic and Mediterranean Fleets in the Mediterranean Sea until 16 March. Subsequently, on 2 May, the destroyer once again accompanied Furious off the coast of Portsmouth while the crew of the aircraft carrier undertook flying training.

The vessel was back in the Mediterranean Sea visiting Malta on 14 March the following year before, on 5 September, taking part in exercises off the coast of Scotland with the fleet, including the Third Battle Squadron and a flotilla of battlecruisers led by HMS Hood. Exercises from Malta following during the following year, the destroyer arriving with Furious and destroyer Tyrian on 20 January ahead of the rest of the fleet. On 7 May the following year, Tetrarch accompanied the fleet to Port de Pollença. The destroyer then undertook a tour of seaside resorts, visiting Milford Haven, St Ives and Dover between 9 June and 21 July. The destroyer returned to Gibraltar with the aircraft carrier Courageous at the end of the year, cruising until 14 March the following year when, again, the destroyer participated in fleet exercises. However, the vessel's service days were numbered. On 22 April 1930, the London Naval Treaty had been signed, which limited total destroyer tonnage in the Royal Navy. The force was looking to introduce more modern destroyers and so needed to retire some of the older vessels, including Tetrarch. The destroyer was sold to Metal Industries at Rosyth, on 28 July 1934 to be broken up.

== Pennant numbers ==
| Pennant number | Date |
|---|---|
| F87 | September 1915 |
| F74 | January 1918 |
| G54 | November 1919 |
| H59 | January 1922 |
