= HMS Ursula =

A ship and two submarines of the Royal Navy have been named HMS Ursula:

- HMS Ursula (1917) was a modified R-class destroyer launched in 1917 and sold in 1929.
- HMS Ursula (N59), a Second World War U-class submarine which was launched on 16 February 1938 and served in home waters then in the Mediterranean, before being transferred to the Soviet Navy in 1944.
- HMS Ursula (S42), a long-range hunter-killer (SSK) Upholder/Victoria-class submarine which was launched on 28 February 1991, and commissioned into the Royal Navy on 8 May 1992 before being purchased from the Royal Navy in 1998 by the Canadian Navy and renamed HMCS Corner Brook.
