= HMS Raider (1916) =

Destroyer of the Royal Navy

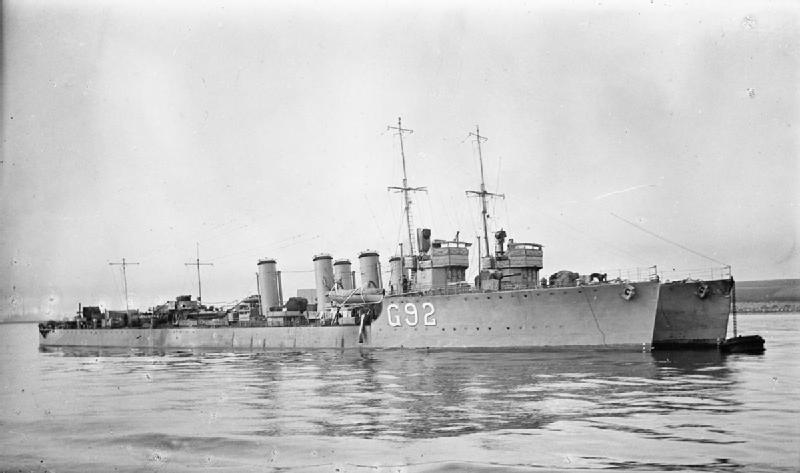
- Two R-class destroyers, sister ship Rob Roy in the foreground

History

United Kingdom
- Name: HMS Raider
- Builder: Swan Hunter & Wigham Richardson, Wallsend
- Yard number: 1007
- Laid down: October 1915
- Launched: 17 July 1916
- Completed: October 1916
- Decommissioned: 29 April 1927
- Fate: Sold to be broken up

General characteristics
- Class & type: R-class destroyer
- Displacement: 975 long tons (991 t) (normal); 1,065 long tons (1,082 t) (deep load)
- Length: 265 ft (80.8 m) p.p.; 276 ft (84.1 m) (o.a.)
- Beam: 26 ft 8 in (8.13 m)
- Draught: 9 ft (2.7 m)
- Installed power: 3 Yarrow boilers, 27,000 shp (20,000 kW)
- Propulsion: Brown-Curtis geared steam turbines, 2 shafts
- Speed: 36 kn (41.4 mph; 66.7 km/h)
- Range: 3,450 nmi (6,390 km) at 15 kn (28 km/h)
- Complement: 82
- Armament: 3 × single QF 4-inch (102 mm) Mark IV guns; 1 × single 2 pdr 40 mm (1.6 in) AA gun; 2 × twin 21 in (533 mm) torpedo tubes

HMS Raider was the second of a class of sixty two R-class destroyers operated by the Royal Navy. Launched in 1916, the vessel served with the Grand Fleet during World War I. The destroyer was built as part of the preceding M-class but was equipped with geared turbines which improved efficiency and increased range. The ship was involved in anti-submarine patrols, but did not sink any German submarines. After the war, the destroyer initially moved to Harwich and was briefly stationed in Ireland after the Irish Civil War. In 1923, the Navy decided to retire the older destroyers in the fleet and, although initially spared, Raider was decommissioned and sold to be broken up in 1927.

== Design ==
Raider was originally ordered by the British Admiralty in May 1915 as part of the Sixth War Construction Programme as one of eighteen M-class destroyers. Instead, the ship was equipped, as had sister ship Radstock, with geared steam turbines and so became the second prototype for the R-class. The new engines proved to be more efficient, providing a greater range for a given quantity of fuel. Comparative trials between the destroyers Romola and Norman showed a 15% saving in fuel oil at 18 knots (33 km/h; 21 mph) and 28% at 25 knots (46 km/h; 29 mph).

The destroyer had a length of 265 feet (80.8 m) between perpendiculars and 276 ft (84.1 m) overall, with a beam of 26 ft 8 in (8.13 m) and a mean draught of 9 ft (2.7 m). Displacement was 975 long tons (991 t) normal and 1,065 long tons (1,082 t) deep load. Power was provided by three Yarrow boilers feeding two Brown-Curtis geared steam turbines rated at 27,000 shaft horsepower (20,000 kW) and driving two shafts, to give a design speed of 36 knots (67 km/h; 41 mph). Three funnels were fitted. A total of 296 long tons (301 t) of fuel oil was carried, giving a design range of 3,450 nautical miles (6,390 km; 3,970 mi) at 15 knots (28 km/h; 17 mph).

Armament consisted of three single QF 4 in (100 mm) Mk IV QF guns on the ship's centreline, with one on the forecastle, one aft on a raised platform and one between the central and aft funnels. A single QF 2-pounder 40 mm (1.6 in) "pom-pom" anti-aircraft gun was carried, while torpedo armament consisted of two twin rotating mounts for 21 in (533 mm) torpedoes. The ship had a complement of 82 officers and ratings.

== Service ==
Raider was laid down by Swan Hunter & Wigham Richardson at Wallsend on the River Tyne in October 1915 and given the yard number 1007. The ship was launched on 17 July 1916 and completed in October. On commissioning, Raider joined the newly created Fifteenth Destroyer Flotilla of the Grand Fleet. The Flotilla took part in anti-submarine patrols east of the Shetland Islands during June 1917, but Raider was unsuccessful in sighting any enemy boats.

The vessel was part of the Fifteenth Destroyer Flotilla at the end of the war. After the Grand Fleet was disbanded, the ship was initially moved to reserve at Nore alongside over sixty other destroyers but then returned to service on 20 November 1919 based at Harwich. On 19 November 1920, Raider accompanied submarines of the H class to a service in memorial of the crew of the sunken M1, held over the place the boat had been last seen. The destroyer was briefly sent to Derry and Lough Swilly between 11 and 13 July 1923 at the end of the Irish Civil War. During that year, the Navy decided to scrap many of the older destroyers in preparation for the introduction of newer and larger vessels. Raider was initially spared, being refitted and transferred to the Portland Anti-Submarine Flotilla, arriving on 3 July 1925. Ships of the class were fitted with ASDIC and used to train crews in anti-submarine warfare. However, it was instead decided that Raider be scrapped. The destroyer was therefore sold to G Cohen on 29 April 1927 to be broken up at Grays.

== Pennant numbers ==
Pennant number	Date
G81	September 1915
G86	January 1917
G82	January 1918
D95	September 1918
G41	November 1919
