= HMS Redgauntlet (1916) =

Destroyer of the Royal Navy

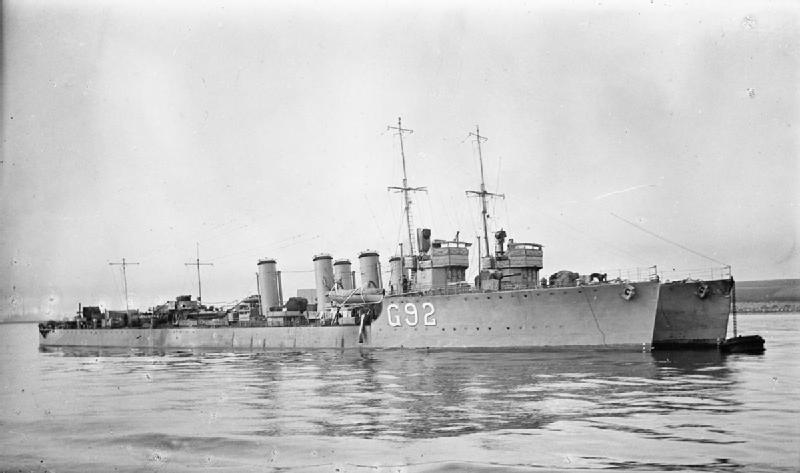
- Two R-class destroyers, sistership HMS Rob Roy nearest

History

United Kingdom
- Name: HMS Redgauntlet
- Namesake: Redgauntlet
- Builder: Denny, Dumbarton
- Yard number: 1057
- Laid down: 28 September 1915
- Launched: 23 November 1916
- Completed: 7 February 1917
- Decommissioned: July 1927
- Fate: Broken up by J.J. King of Garston

General characteristics
- Class & type: R-class destroyer
- Displacement: 975 long tons (991 t) normal; 1,222.5 long tons (1,242 t) deep load
- Length: 265 ft (80.8 m) p.p.
- Beam: 26 ft 9 in (8.15 m)
- Draught: 8 ft 10 1/4 in (2.699 m)
- Propulsion: 3 Yarrow boilers; 2 geared Brown-Curtis steam turbines, 27,000 shp (20,000 kW)
- Speed: 36 knots (41.4 mph; 66.7 km/h)
- Range: 3,450 nmi (6,390 km) at 15 kn (28 km/h)
- Complement: 82
- Armament: 3 × QF 4-inch (101.6 mm) Mark IV guns, mounting P Mk. IX; 1 × single 2-pounder (40-mm) "pom-pom" Mk. II anti-aircraft gun; 4 × 21 in (533 mm) torpedo tubes (2×2); 2 × 14 in (356 mm) torpedo tubes (2×1)

HMS Redgauntlet was an R-class destroyer which served with the Royal Navy. Launched on 2 July 1916, the ship operated as part of the Harwich Force during World War I and then, after the War, with the Home Fleet. While taking part in an anti-submarine patrol on 21 May 1917, the ship struck a mine but, although severely damaged, was able to return to England for repairs. Subsequently, the destroyer joined the anti-submarine school at Portsmouth before being sold to be broken up on 16 December 1926 after less than ten years service.

== Design and development ==
Redgauntlet was one of three R-class destroyers ordered by the British Admiralty from William Denny and Brothers on 17 July 1915 as part of the Sixth War Construction Programme at a cost of cost £159,200 each. The design was generally similar to the preceding M-class destroyers, although equipped with geared turbines to improve efficiency, raising the central gun mounted on a bandstand and having minor changes to improve seakeeping. The destroyer was 265 feet (80.77 m) long between perpendiculars, with a beam of 26 feet 9 inches (8.15 m) and a draught of 8 feet 10 1/4 inches (2.70 m). Displacement was 975 long tons (991 t) normal and 1,222 1/2 long tons (1,242 t) deep load. Power was provided by three Yarrow boilers feeding two Brown-Curtis geared steam turbines rated at 27,000 shaft horsepower (20,000 kW) and driving two shafts, to give a design speed of 36 knots (67 km/h; 41 mph). Three funnels were fitted. A total of 296 long tons (301 t) of fuel oil was carried, giving a design range of 3,450 nautical miles (6,390 km; 3,970 mi) at 15 knots (28 km/h; 17 mph). The ship's complement was 82 officers and ratings.

Armament consisted of three 4 in (100 mm) Mk IV QF guns on the ship's centreline, with one on the forecastle, one aft on a raised platform and one between the second and third funnels. A single 2-pounder (40 mm) pom-pom anti-aircraft gun was carried. Torpedo armament consisted of two twin mounts for 21 in (533 mm) torpedoes mounted aft and two individual tubes for 14 in (356 mm) torpedoes fixed on the beam.

== Construction and career ==
Redgauntlet was laid down by William Denny and Brothers at Dumbarton on the River Clyde on 30 September 1915 with the yard number 1057. Launching took place on 23 November 1916, the destroyer leaving the yard on 27 January and being delivered on 7 February 1917.

On commissioning, Redgauntlet joined the 10th Destroyer Flotilla of the Harwich Force. The Harwich Force was heavily committed to escorting merchant vessels, but casualties through conflict with the enemy were rare. For example, on 10 May 1917, a large contingent of destroyers from the Force were escorting a Dutch convoy from the Hook of Holland when they encountered twelves German torpedo boats. Despite the expenditure of much ammunition, no hits were obtained on either side. Two days later, the Flotilla was involved in supporting the bombardment of Zeebrugge by the monitors Erebus and Terror, again without loss. However, later that month, on 21 May, the destroyer struck a British mine while on patrol looking for submarines in the English Channel. Despite being severely damaged, Redgauntlet returned to Sheerness for repairs and was soon back in service.

At the dissolution of the Harwich Force after the war, Redgauntlet was reassigned to the 4th Destroyer Flotilla under King George V as part of the newly formed Home Fleet. Subsequently, the ship was allocated to the anti-submarine school at Portsmouth and was involved in the development of ASDIC. However, in 1923, the Navy decided to scrap many of the older destroyers in preparation for the introduction of newer and larger vessels. Redgauntlet was one of the destroyers chosen for retirement. In July 1927, the destroyer was sold to J.J. King of Garston and broken up.

== Pennant numbers ==
Pennant number	Date
F.51	1917
F.58	1917
F.A4	1917
F.97	1918
