= HMS Radstock =

Destroyer of the Royal Navy

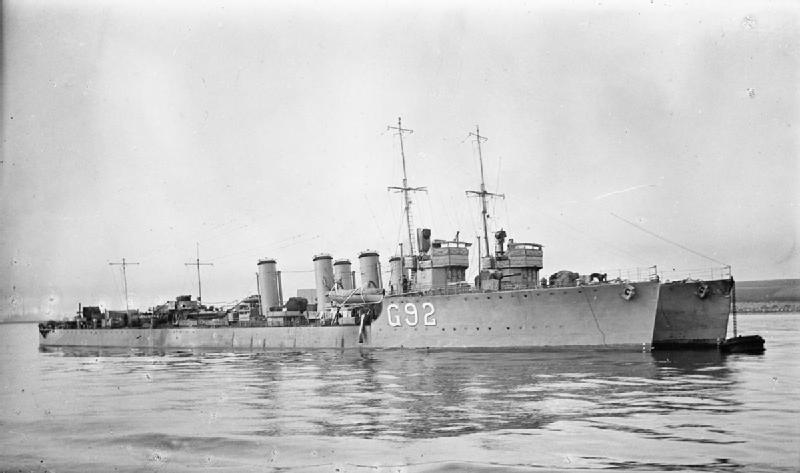
- Two R class destroyers, sistership HMS Rob Rob in the foreground

History

United Kingdom
- Name: HMS Radstock
- Builder: Swan Hunter & Wigham Richardson, Wallsend
- Yard number: 1005
- Laid down: 6 September 1915
- Launched: 8 June 1916
- Commissioned: 20 September 1916
- Decommissioned: 29 April 1927
- Fate: Sold to be broken up

General characteristics
- Class & type: R-class destroyer
- Displacement: 975 long tons (991 t) (normal); 1,065 long tons (1,082 t) (deep load)
- Length: 265 ft (80.8 m) (p.p.); 276 ft (84.1 m) (o.a.)
- Beam: 26 ft 8 in (8.13 m)
- Draught: 9 ft (2.7 m)
- Propulsion: 3 Yarrow boilers; 2 geared Brown-Curtis steam turbines, 27,000 shp (20,000 kW)
- Speed: 36 knots (41.4 mph; 66.7 km/h)
- Range: 3,450 nmi (6,390 km) at 15 kn (28 km/h)
- Complement: 82
- Armament: 3 × single QF 4-inch (102 mm) Mark IV guns; 1 × single 2 pdr 40 mm (1.6 in) AA gun; 2 × twin 21 in (533 mm) torpedo tubes

HMS Radstock was the first in a class of 62 R-class destroyers. The design differed from the preceding M-class primarily in the use of geared turbines, which gave better fuel efficiency. The ship was launched in 1916 and served with the Grand Fleet of the Royal Navy during World War I as in an escort and anti-submarine role. While escorting a convoy in 1918, the destroyer collided with the merchant ship Volute, but otherwise had an uneventful war. After the Armistice of 11 November 1918 that ended the war, the vessel was recommissioned with reduced complement and joined the Reserve Fleet. Radstock stayed in Reserve until 1927. By this time, the vessel had deteriorated and, despite having a refit in 1925, was deemed unfit for service and was sold to be broken up.

== Design and development ==
Radstock was originally ordered by the British Admiralty in May 1915 as part of the Sixth War Construction Programme as one of eighteen M-class destroyers. However, the ship was equipped with two geared steam turbines and became the prototype for the R-class. Comparative trials between sistership Romola and Norman showed a 15% saving in fuel at 15 knots (28 km/h; 17 mph) and 28% at 15 knots (28 km/h; 17 mph).

The destroyer had a length of 265 feet (80.8 m) between perpendiculars and 276 feet (84.1 m) overall, with a beam of 26 feet 8 inches (8.1 m) and a mean draught of 9 feet (2.7 m). Displacement was 975 long tons (991 t) normal and 1,173 long tons (1,192 t) deep load. Power was provided by three Yarrow boilers feeding two Brown-Curtis geared steam turbines rated at 27,000 shp (20,000 kW) and driving two shafts, to give a design speed of 36 knots (67 km/h; 41 mph). Three funnels were fitted. A fuel load of 296 long tons (301 t) of fuel oil was carried, giving a design range of 3,450 nautical miles (6,390 km; 3,970 mi) at 15 knots (28 km/h; 17 mph).

Armament consisted of three QF 4-inch (102 mm) Mk IV guns on the ship's centreline, with one on the forecastle, one aft on a raised platform and one between the second and third funnels. A single QF 2-pounder 40 mm (1.6 in) "pom-pom" anti-aircraft gun was carried, while torpedo armament consisted of two twin mounts for 21 in (533 mm) torpedoes. The ship had a complement of 82 officers and ratings.

== Construction and service ==
Radstock was laid down by Swan Hunter & Wigham Richardson at Wallsend on the River Tyne on 5 September 1915 with yard number 1005 and launched on 8 June 1916. The vessel was completed on 20 September that year.

On commissioning, Radstock joined the newly created Fifteenth Destroyer Flotilla of the Grand Fleet. The destroyer was soon in action, patrolling the North Sea for submarines. Despite participating in a number of sweeps, the vessel did not sight the enemy. Due to the continued submarine threat, the destroyer was transferred to escort duties and along with Northesk, was responsible for escorting the first southbound convoy to travel from Lerwick to Immingham on 29 April 1917. Convoys often operated at night and in very difficult conditions, and accidents happened. The vessel was found jointly culpable for a collision with the merchant ship Volute, which was leading a convoy that Radstock and sistership Undine were escorting, on 12 April 1918. Radstock remained part of the Fifteenth Destroyer Flotilla at the end of the war.

After the Grand Fleet was disbanded, Radstock briefly joined the Fourth Destroyer Flotilla, but on 16 September 1919, the ship was paid off to join Reserve Destroyer Flotilla at the Nore. Shortly afterwards, on 15 October, the ship was recommissioned with Reduced Complement and based at Port Edgar, although still part of the Reserve Fleet. In 1923, the Navy decided to scrap many of the older destroyers, up to and including some of the R-class, in preparation for the introduction of newer and larger vessels. However, it looked as if Radstock was to be retained and, on 2 June 1925, the destroyer, based again at the Nore, undertook an extensive refit in Sheerness. However, having spent so long stored in reserve, the destroyer had deteriorated and was considered by the Admiralty to be in too poor condition to return to operations. On 29 April 1927, Radstock was retired and sold to Thos. W. Ward to be broken up at Grays.

== Pennant numbers ==
Pennant number	Date
G79	September 1915
G76	January 1917
G81	January 1918
D94	September 1918
H64	January 1922
