= HMS Northesk =

British M-Class destroyer

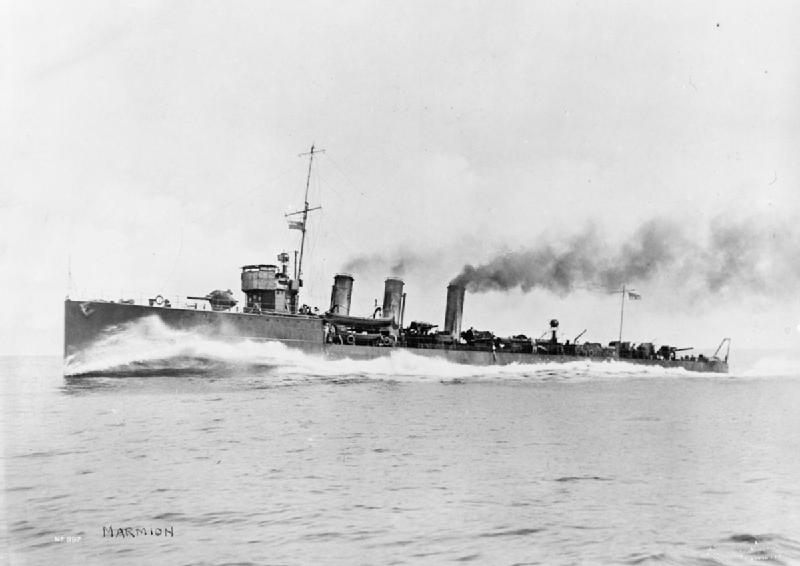
- Sister ship HMS Marmion

History

United Kingdom
- Name: HMS Northesk
- Namesake: Earl Northesk
- Ordered: November 1914
- Builder: Palmers, Hebburn
- Launched: 6 July 1916
- Completed: October 1916
- Out of service: 9 May 1921
- Fate: Sold to be broken up

General characteristics
- Class & type: Admiralty M-class destroyer
- Displacement: 950 long tons (970 t) (normal); 1,021 long tons (1,037 t) (full load)
- Length: 265 ft (80.77 m) (p.p.)
- Beam: 26 ft 9 in (8.15 m)
- Draught: 16 ft 3 in (4.95 m)
- Installed power: 3 Yarrow boilers, 25,000 shp (19,000 kW)
- Propulsion: Brown-Curtis steam turbines, 3 shafts
- Speed: 34 knots (63.0 km/h; 39.1 mph)
- Range: 2,280 nmi (4,220 km; 2,620 mi) at 17 kn (31 km/h; 20 mph)
- Complement: 80
- Armament: 3 × single QF 4-inch (102 mm) Mark IV guns; 1 × single 2-pdr 40 mm (2 in) AA gun; 2 × twin 21 in (533 mm) torpedo tubes

HMS Northesk was an Admiralty M-class destroyer which served in the Royal Navy during the First World War. The M class was an improvement on the previous L-class destroyer, capable of higher speed. The vessel was launched in 1916 and joined the Grand Fleet. Northesk was involved in escorting convoys, including the first southbound convoy on the coastal route between Lerwick and Immingham in 1917. After the Armistice that marked the end of the First World War, the destroyer joined the Mediterranean Fleet and operated in the area around Sevastopol, including assisting in the evacuation of the Crimea in 1919. Soon afterwards, in 1921, Northesk was decommissioned and sold to be broken up.

== Design and development ==
Northesk was one of twenty-two Admiralty M-class destroyer destroyers ordered by the British Admiralty in November 1914 as part of the Third War Construction Programme. The M class was an improved version of the earlier L class destroyers, designed to reach a higher speed in order to counter rumoured German fast destroyers, although it transpired these vessels did not exist. Although envisioned to have a maximum speed of 36 knots (67 km/h; 41 mph), they were eventually designed for a speed 2 knots (3.7 km/h; 2.3 mph) slower.

The destroyer had a length between perpendiculars of 265 feet (80.77 m), with a beam of 26 feet 9 inches (8.15 m) and a draught of 16 feet 3 inches (4.95 m). Displacement was 950 long tons (970 t) normal and 1,021 long tons (1,037 t) full load. Power was provided by three Yarrow boilers feeding Brown-Curtis steam turbines rated at 25,000 shaft horsepower (19,000 kW) and driving three shafts. Three funnels were fitted. A total of 268 long tons (272 t) of oil could be carried, including 40 long tons (41 t) in peace tanks that were not used in wartime, giving a range of 2,280 nautical miles (4,220 km; 2,620 mi) at 17 knots (31 km/h; 20 mph).

Armament consisted of three single QF 4-inch (102 mm) Mk IV guns on the ship's centreline, with one on the forecastle, one aft on a raised platform and one between the middle and aft funnels. Torpedo armament consisted of two twin mounts for 21 in (533 mm) torpedoes aft of the funnels. A single QF 2-pounder 40 mm (1.6 in) "pom-pom" anti-aircraft gun was mounted between the torpedo tubes. Northesk was equipped with two depth charge chutes for anti-submarine warfare, the number of depth charges carried increasing as the war progressed. The ship had a complement of 80 officers and ratings.

== Construction and career ==
Laid down by Palmers Shipbuilding and Iron Company of Hebburn, Northesk was launched on 5 July 1916 and completed during October that year. The destroyer was the only Royal Navy ship to be named after Rear Admiral William Carnegie, 7th Earl of Northesk, who fought at the Battle of Trafalgar. The vessel was deployed as part of the Grand Fleet, joining the Fifteenth Destroyer Flotilla at Scapa Flow.

Due to the continued German submarine threat, the destroyer was transferred to escort duties and, along with the R-class destroyer Radstock, was responsible for escorting the first southbound convoy to travel from Lerwick to Immingham on 29 April 1917. On 21 June, the destroyer was escorting a convoy of thirteen ships when the submarine SM U-19 sank two merchant ships and escaped without harm. The vessel remained part of the Fifteenth Destroyer Flotilla in July 1917.

After the Armistice of 11 November 1918 and the end of the First World War, Northesk was transferred to the Mediterranean Fleet at Gibraltar. The Russian Civil War was raging and the United Kingdom decided to send units of the Royal Navy to the front line. Northesk was one of the ships chosen and sailed to Sevastopol, arriving on 23 November 1918. The destroyer subsequently returned on 28 April 1919 and helped with the evacuation of the Crimea. However, the posting did not last long. The destroyer returned to Britain, was decommissioned and, on 9 May 1921, sold to Thos. W. Ward to be broken up at Rainham, Kent.

== Pennant numbers ==
Pennant number	Date
G15	September 1915
G83	January 1917
H21	June 1918
G36	January 1919
