= HMS Tenacious (1917) =

British R-Class destroyer

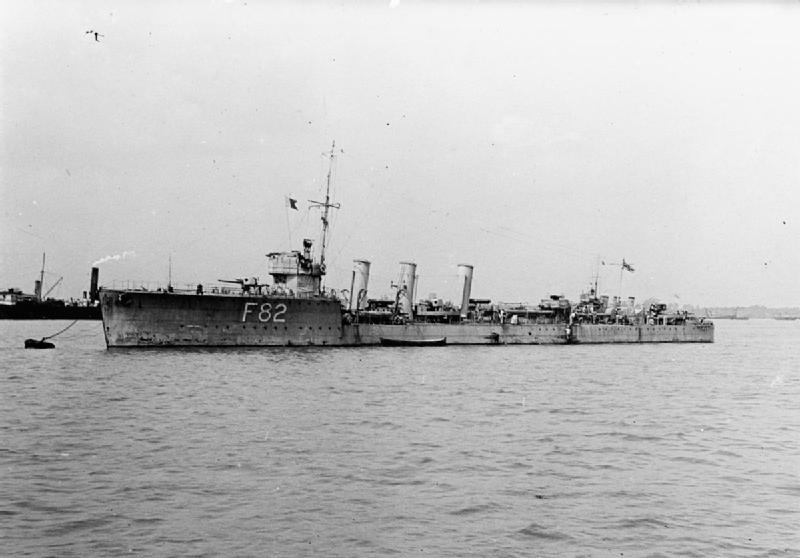
- Sister ship HMS Thisbe

History

United Kingdom
- Name: HMS Tenacious
- Ordered: March 1916
- Builder: Harland & Wolff, Govan
- Laid down: 25 July 1916
- Launched: 21 March 1917
- Completed: 12 August 1917
- Out of service: 26 June 1928
- Fate: Sold to be broken up

General characteristics
- Class & type: R-class destroyer
- Displacement: 975 long tons (991 t) (normal); 1,173 long tons (1,192 t) (deep load)
- Length: 265 ft (81 m) (p.p.)
- Beam: 26 ft 9 in (8 m)
- Draught: 9 ft (3 m)
- Installed power: 3 Yarrow boilers, 27,000 shp (20,000 kW)
- Propulsion: 2 geared Brown-Curtis steam turbines, 2 shafts
- Speed: 36 knots (67 km/h; 41 mph)
- Range: 3,450 nmi (6,390 km; 3,970 mi) at 15 knots (28 km/h; 17 mph)
- Complement: 82
- Armament: 3 × single QF 4 in (102 mm) Mark IV guns; 1 × single 2-pdr 40 mm (2 in) AA gun; 2 × twin 21 in (533 mm) torpedo tubes

HMS Tenacious was an R-class destroyer that served in the Royal Navy during the First World War. The R class were an improvement on the previous M class with geared steam turbines to improve efficiency. Launched in 1917, Tenacious served with the Eleventh Destroyer Flotilla of the Grand Fleet. The destroyer had a generally uneventful war. Despite sailing in 1918 to engage the German High Seas Fleet in one of the final sorties of war, the destroyer did not see the enemy fleet and no shots were fired. After the Armistice, the ship was stationed at Devonport. Following a decision to replace older destroyers in the Royal Navy, Tenacious was retired in 1928 and sold to be broken up.

== Design and development ==
Tenacious was one of 23 R-class destroyers ordered by the British Admiralty in March 1916 as part of the Seventh War Programme during the First World War. The design was generally similar to the preceding M class, but differed in having geared steam turbines, giving greater fuel efficiency, the aft gun mounted on a raised platform, higher forecastle for better seakeeping and a larger and more robust bridge structure.

The destroyer had a length of 265 feet (81 m) between perpendiculars and 276 feet (84 m) overall, a beam of 26 feet 9 inches (8 m) and a draught of 9 feet (3 m). Displacement was 975 long tons (991 t) normal and 1,173 long tons (1,192 t) deep load. Power was provided by three Yarrow boilers feeding two Brown-Curtis geared turbines rated at 27,000 shaft horsepower (20,000 kW) and driving two shafts, to give a design speed of 36 knots (67 km/h; 41 mph). Three funnels were fitted. A total of 296 long tons (301 t) of fuel oil was carried, which gave a design range of 3,450 nautical miles (6,390 km; 3,970 mi) at 15 knots (28 km/h; 17 mph).

Armament consisted of three single 4 in (102 mm) Mk IV guns on the ship's centreline, with one on the forecastle, one aft on a raised platform and one between the second and third funnels. A single 2-pounder 40 mm (2 in) "pom-pom" anti-aircraft gun was carried, while torpedo armament consisted of two twin mounts for 21 in (533 mm) torpedoes. The destroyer was later fitted with racks and storage for depth charges. The number of depth charges available increased in service. By 1918, the vessel was carrying between 30 and 50 depth charges. The ship had a complement of 82 officers and ratings.

== Construction and career ==
Laid down by Harland & Wolff at their shipyard in Govan on 25 July 1916, Tenacious was launched on 21 March the following year and completed on 12 August. The destroyer was the first ship in Royal Navy service to carry the name. On commissioning, Tenacious was deployed as part of the Grand Fleet, joining the Eleventh Destroyer Flotilla. The destroyer was allocated to anti-submarine warfare. On 16 October, the ship formed part of a fleet of 84 ships, including 54 destroyers, that were sent to protect convoys travelling from Scandinavia. The deployment led to two British destroyers being sunk by German cruisers while Tenacious did not even sight the enemy. On 24 April 1918, the flotilla took part in the Royal Navy's engagement with one of the final sorties of the German High Seas Fleet during the First World War, although the two fleets did not actually meet and the destroyer returned unharmed.

After the Armistice of 11 November 1918 that ended the war, the Grand Fleet was dissolved and Tenacious was moved to local defence based at Devonport. However, the navy needed to reduce both the number of ships and the amount of staff to save money. In 1923, the Navy decided to scrap many of the older destroyers in preparation for the introduction of newer and larger vessels. The destroyer was sold to Thos. W. Ward at Briton Ferry, on 26 June 1928 to be broken up.

== Pennant numbers ==
Pennant number	Date
F96	September 1915
G02	January 1918
G61	November 1919
H1A	January 1922
