= HMS Skate (1917) =

Destroyer of the Royal Navy

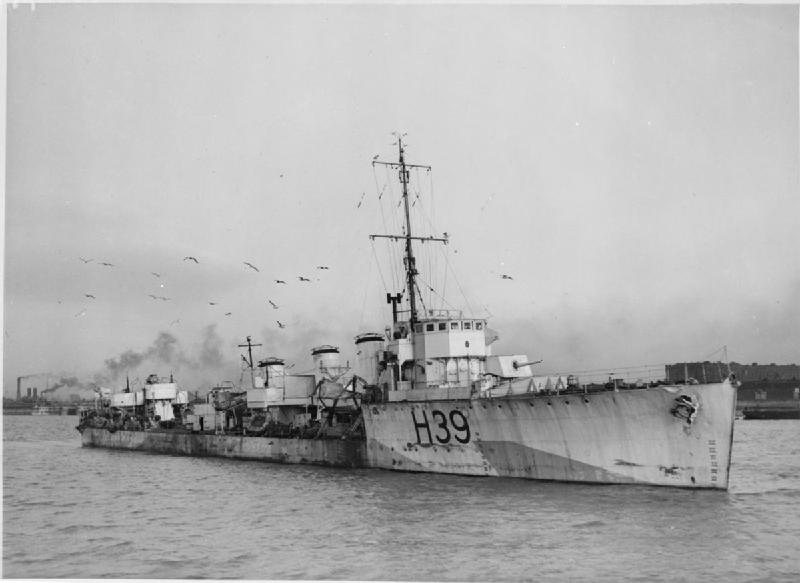
- Skate at Liverpool in 1942

History

United Kingdom
- Name: HMS Skate
- Ordered: 8 December 1915
- Builder: John Brown & Company, Clydebank
- Laid down: 12 January 1916
- Launched: 11 January 1917
- Commissioned: 19 February 1917
- Fate: Sold for scrap in 1947

General characteristics
- Class & type: R-class destroyer
- Displacement: 900 long tons (910 t) standard; 1,220 long tons (1,240 t) full
- Length: 265 ft (81 m) p/p; 276 ft (84 m) o/a
- Beam: 26 ft 9 in (8.15 m)
- Draught: 8 ft 6 in (2.59 m); 10 ft 9 in (3.28 m) full load
- Propulsion: 3 Yarrow-type water-tube boilers; Brown-Curtis single reduction geared steam turbines, 27,000 shp
- Speed: 36 knots (41 mph; 67 km/h); 32.5 kn (37.4 mph; 60.2 km/h) full
- Range: 3,440 nmi (6,370 km) at 15 kn (17 mph; 28 km/h); 1,860 nmi (3,440 km) at 20 kn (23 mph; 37 km/h)
- Complement: 90
- Armament: As designed : 3 × QF 4-inch (101.6 mm) L/40 Mark IV guns on single mounting P Mark IX; 1 × QF 2 pdr Mk.II on mount HA Mk.II, later; 5 × 0.303 in machine guns; 4 × 21 inch (533 mm) torpedo tubes (2×2); As Escort : 1 × QF 4 in (102 mm) L/40 Mk.IV mount P Mk.IX; 1 × QF 12 pdr L/40 Mk.V mount HA Mk.VIII; 4 × 20 mm Oerlikon guns single mount P Mk.III; 2 racks and 8 throwers for depth charges

HMS Skate was an R-class destroyer of the Royal Navy that was laid down and completed during the First World War. She was built at John Brown Shipyard at Clydebank in Scotland and launched on 11 January 1917.

== Description ==
Skate was 276 feet (84.12 m) long overall, with a beam of 26 feet 9 inches (8.15 m) and a mean draught of 9 feet (2.74 m). Displacement was 975 long tons (991 t) normal and 1,075 long tons (1,092 t) deep load. Power was provided by three Yarrow boilers feeding two Parsons geared steam turbines rated at 27,000 shaft horsepower (20,000 kW) and driving two shafts, to give a design speed of 36 knots (67 km/h; 41 mph). Three funnels were fitted. 296 long tons (301 t) of oil were carried, giving a design range of 3,450 nautical miles (6,390 km; 3,970 mi) at 15 knots (28 km/h; 17 mph). Armament consisted of three QF 4in Mk IV guns on the ship's centreline, with one on the forecastle, one aft on a raised platform and one between the second and third funnels. A single 2-pounder (40 mm) pom-pom anti-aircraft gun was carried, while torpedo armament consisted of two twin mounts for 21 in (533 mm) torpedoes. The ship had a complement of 82 officers and ratings.

== Service ==
Skate was one of ten R-class destroyers ordered by the British Admiralty in December 1915 as part of the Seventh War Construction Programme. The ship was laid down at the John Brown & Company shipyard in Clydebank during January 1916, launched in January 1917 and completed in February 1917.

On commissioning, Skate joined the 11th Destroyer Flotilla of the Grand Fleet, but was transferred to the Harwich Force to be part of the 10th Destroyer Flotilla soon after. During the First World War, Skate was torpedoed and damaged in the North Sea off the Maas Lightship by the Imperial German Navy submarine SM UC-69 with the loss of a crew member on 12 March 1917.

At the end of the war, Skate was transferred to Vernon as a tender to the torpedo school. The vessel was reduced to reserve complement and transferred to the depot ship HMS Dido on 12 March 1920.

Skate was one of two survivors of her class by 1939, the other being the HTMS Phra Ruang, and saw extensive service during the Second World War as a convoy escort. This gave her the honour of being the oldest destroyer to see service with the Royal Navy in the latter conflict.

She was converted into a minelayer while undergoing repairs, which is likely why she remained active on the Navy List in 1939. Initially she served as an influence minesweeper to combat the threat of magnetic mines, but such was the need for escorts that she was rearmed in 1941 to take part in the Battle of the Atlantic. She was on North Atlantic duties until 1942 and was part of the escort for the Normandy landings in June 1944.

After the Second World War she was transferred back to the Torpedo school at Vernon in 1945, before being sold in 1947 and broken up in July at Newport in Wales.

== Bibliography ==
- Colledge, J. J.; Warlow, Ben (2006) [1969]. Ships of the Royal Navy: The Complete Record of All Fighting Ships of the Royal Navy from the 15th Century to the Present (3rd Rev ed.). London: Chatham Publishing. ISBN 978-1-86176-281-8. OCLC 67375475.
- Friedman, Norman (2009). British Destroyers: From Earliest Days to the Second World War. Barnsley, UK: Seaforth Publishing. ISBN 978-1-84832-049-9.
- Gardiner, Robert & Gray, Randal, eds. (1985). Conway's All The World's Fighting Ships 1906–1921. London: Conway Maritime Press. ISBN 0-85177-245-5.
- March, Edgar J. (1966). British Destroyers: A History of Development, 1892–1953; Drawn by Admiralty Permission From Official Records & Returns, Ships' Covers & Building Plans. London: Seeley Service. OCLC 164893555.
