= HMS Ulster (1917) =

Destroyer of the Royal Navy

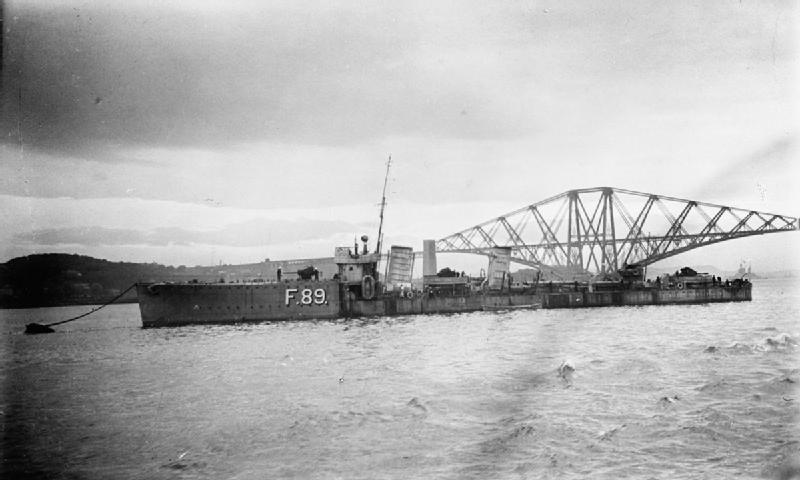
- Sister ship HMS Tristram

History

United Kingdom
- Name: HMS Ulster
- Namesake: Ulster
- Ordered: March 1916
- Builder: William Beardmore and Company, Dalmuir
- Launched: 10 October 1917
- Completed: 21 November 1917
- In service: 21 April 1928
- Fate: Sold to be Broken up

General characteristics
- Class & type: Modified Admiralty R-class destroyer
- Displacement: 1,035 long tons (1,052 t) (normal)
- Length: 276 ft (84.1 m) (o.a.)
- Beam: 27 ft (8.2 m)
- Draught: 11 ft (3.4 m)
- Propulsion: 3 Yarrow boilers; 2 geared Brown-Curtis steam turbines, 27,000 shp (20,000 kW)
- Speed: 36 knots (41.4 mph; 66.7 km/h)
- Range: 3,450 nmi (6,390 km) at 15 kn (28 km/h)
- Complement: 82
- Armament: 3 × QF 4-inch (101.6 mm) Mark IV guns, mounting P Mk. IX; 1 × single 2-pounder (40-mm) "pom-pom" Mk. II anti-aircraft gun; 4 × 21 in (533 mm) torpedo tubes (2×2)

HMS Ulster was a modified Admiralty R-class destroyer that served in the Royal Navy during the First World War. The Modified R class added attributes of the Yarrow Later M class to improve the capability of the ships to operate in bad weather. Launched on 10 October 1917, the vessel served with the Grand Fleet. After the war, the destroyer was placed initially in the Home Fleet, but then moved to the Reserve Fleet before, on 21 April 1928, being sold to be broken up.

== Design and development ==
Ulster was one of eleven Modified R-class destroyers ordered by the British Admiralty in March 1916 as part of the Eighth War Construction Programme. The design was a development of the existing R class, adding features from the Yarrow Later M class which had been introduced based on wartime experience. The forward two boilers were transposed and vented through a single funnel, enabling the bridge and forward gun to be placed further aft. Combined with hull-strengthening, this improved the destroyers' ability to operate at high speed in bad weather.

Ulster was 276 feet (84.1 m) long overall and 265 feet (81 m) long between perpendiculars, with a beam of 27 feet (8.2 m) and a draught of 11 feet (3.4 m). Displacement was 1,035 long tons (1,052 t) normal and 1,086 long tons (1,103 t) at deep load. Power was provided by three Yarrow boilers feeding two Brown-Curtis geared steam turbines rated at 27,000 shaft horsepower (20,000 kW) and driving two shafts, to give a design speed of 36 knots (67 km/h; 41 mph). Two funnels were fitted. A total of 296 long tons (301 t) of fuel oil were carried, giving a design range of 3,450 nautical miles (6,390 km; 3,970 mi) at 15 knots (28 km/h; 17 mph).

Armament consisted of three single 4-inch (102 mm) Mk V QF guns on the ship's centreline, with one on the forecastle, one aft on a raised platform and one between the funnels. Increased elevation extended the range of the gun by 1,800 metres (2,000 yd) to 11,000 metres (12,000 yd). A single 2-pounder 40 mm (1.6 in) "pom-pom anti-aircraft gun was carried on a platform between two twin mounts for 21 in (533 mm) torpedoes. The ship had a complement of 82 officers and ratings.

== Construction and careers ==
Laid down by William Beardmore and Company in Dalmuir with the yard number 560, Ulster was launched on 10 October 1917 and completed on 21 November. The vessel was the first of the name, named after Ulster, one of the traditional provinces of Ireland.

On commissioning, Ulster joined the Thirteenth Destroyer Flotilla of the Grand Fleet, and served there until 1919. The flotilla took part in the Royal Navy's sortie to intercept one of the final sorties of the German High Seas Fleet during the First World War, on 24 April 1918, although the two fleets did not actually meet and the destroyer did not engage the enemy.

When the Grand Fleet was disbanded after the Armistice of 11 November 1918 that ended the war, Ulster was transferred to the Home Fleet under the Flag of King George V, but was reduced to the Reserve Fleet by April 1920. On 5 July that year, the destroyer left Chatham to take part in exercises for the Reserve Fleet. These happened annually. In 1923, the Navy decided to retire many of the older destroyers in preparation for the introduction of newer and larger vessels. The ship was one of those chosen to be removed from the service and was sold to Thos. W. Ward of Pembroke Dock on 21 April 1928 and broken up.

== Pennant numbers ==
Pennant number	Date
F91	January 1917
F17	January 1918
F01	January 1919
H09	January 1922
