= HMS Tempest (H71) =

Destroyer of the Royal Navy

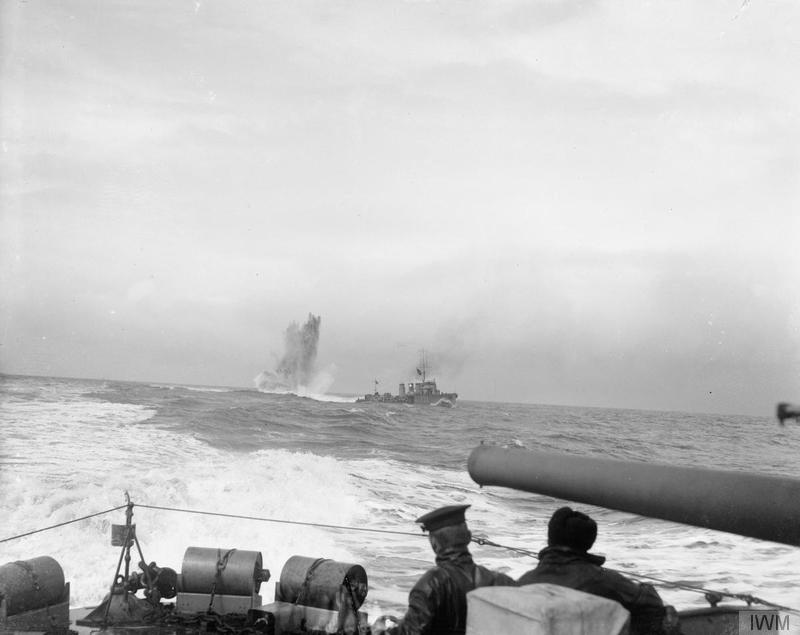
- Distant view of HMS Tempest dropping depth charges in Harwich, Essex on 19th April 1918.

History

United Kingdom
- Name: HMS Tempest
- Builder: Fairfield Shipbuilding and Engineering Company
- Yard number: 524
- Launched: 26 January 1917
- Commissioned: April 1917
- Recommissioned: October 1919
- Fate: Sold for scrapping January 1937

General characteristics
- Class & type: R-class destroyer
- Displacement: 975 long tons (991 t) standard
- Length: 276 ft (84.1 m)
- Beam: 26 ft 9 in (8.15 m)
- Draught: 9 ft 10 in (3.00 m)
- Propulsion: 3 Yarrow boilers; 2 geared Brown-Curtis steam turbines, 27,000 shp
- Speed: 36 knots (41.4 mph; 66.7 km/h)
- Range: 3,440 nmi (6,370 km) at 15 kn (28 km/h)
- Complement: 82 (wartime)
- Armament: 3 × QF 4-inch (101.6 mm) Mark IV guns, mounting P Mk. IX; 1 × single 2-pounder (40-mm) "pom-pom" Mk. II anti-aircraft gun; 4 × 21 in (533 mm) torpedo tubes (2×2)

HMS Tempest was an R-class destroyer of the Royal Navy, built by Fairfield Shipbuilding and Engineering Company at Govan on Clydeside and launched on 26 January 1917 during the First World War.

== Design ==
Tempest was one of twelve R-class destroyers ordered by the British Admiralty in March 1916 as part of the Eighth War Construction Programme. The ship was launched on 26 January December 1917 and completed in 20 March 1917.

Tempest was 276 feet (84.1 m) long overall, with a beam of 26 feet 9 inches (8.15 m) and a draught of 9 feet 10 inches (3.00 m). Displacement was 975 long tons (991 t) normal and 1,075 long tons (1,092 t) deep load. Power was provided by three Yarrow boilers feeding two Brown-Curtis geared steam turbines rated at 27,000 shaft horsepower (20,000 kW) and driving two shafts, to give a design speed of 36 knots (67 km/h; 41 mph). Three funnels were fitted. 296 long tons (301 t) of oil were carried, giving a design range of 3,440 nautical miles (6,370 km; 3,960 mi) at 15 knots (28 km/h; 17 mph).

== Service ==
After commissioning, Tempest joined the Tenth Destroyer Flotilla as part of the Harwich Force in April 1917. On 23 April 1918, Tempest participated in the First Ostend Raid, for which she formed part of "Unit X" which sailed from Dover and escorted the blockships from the Goodwin Sands until they reached a smoke screen which had been laid by Motor Launches off Ostend. After that they joined the Dunkirk-based destroyer flotilla in supporting the small craft inshore, "within close range of the enemy's heavy batteries". Tempest remained with the Tenth Flotilla at Harwich until its dispersal in February 1919. In October 1919, she was recommissioned with a reduced complement.

In October 1930, Tempest was used to repatriate the bodies of 48 men who had been killed in the crash of the R101 airship near Beauvais in France. The bodies were carried by Tempest from Boulogne-Sur-Mer to Dover, from where they were taken by rail to lie in state at Westminster Hall.

She was finally sold for scrapping on 28 January 1937 and broken up at Briton Ferry.

== Bibliography ==
- Colledge, J. J.; Warlow, Ben (2006) [1969]. Ships of the Royal Navy: The Complete Record of All Fighting Ships of the Royal Navy from the 15th Century to the Present (3rd Rev ed.). London: Chatham Publishing. ISBN 978-1-86176-281-8. OCLC 67375475.
- Friedman, Norman (2009). British Destroyers: From Earliest Days to the Second World War. Barnsley, UK: Seaforth Publishing. ISBN 978-1-84832-049-9.
- Gardiner, Robert & Gray, Randal, eds. (1985). Conway's All The World's Fighting Ships 1906–1921. London: Conway Maritime Press. ISBN 0-85177-245-5.
- March, Edgar J. (1966). British Destroyers: A History of Development, 1892–1953; Drawn by Admiralty Permission From Official Records & Returns, Ships' Covers & Building Plans. London: Seeley Service. OCLC 164893555.
