= HMS Undine (1917) =

Destroyer of the Royal Navy

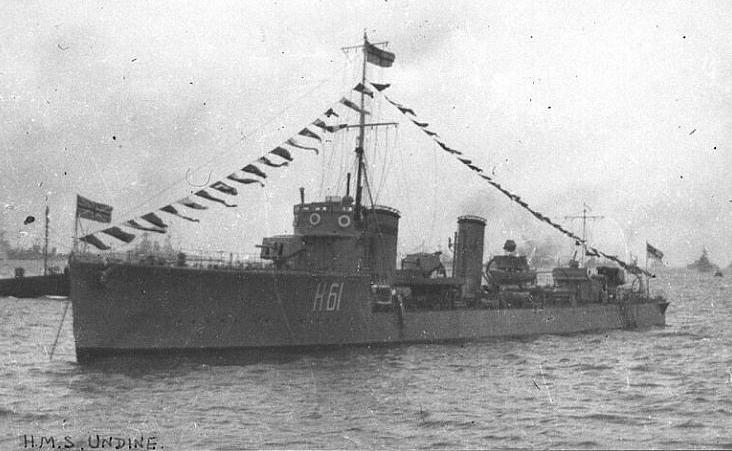
- HMS Undine

History

United Kingdom
- Name: HMS Undine
- Builder: Fairfield Shipbuilding and Engineering Company, Govan
- Laid down: 23 September 1916
- Launched: 22 March 1917
- Completed: 26 May 1917
- Out of service: 28 September 1927
- Fate: Wrecked on route to being broken up off Horse Sand Fort, Portsmouth

General characteristics
- Class & type: Modified Admiralty R-class destroyer
- Displacement: 1,035 long tons (1,052 t) (normal)
- Length: 276 ft (84.1 m) (o.a.)
- Beam: 27 ft (8.2 m)
- Draught: 11 ft (3.4 m)
- Propulsion: 3 Yarrow boilers; 2 geared Brown-Curtis steam turbines, 27,000 shp (20,000 kW)
- Speed: 36 knots (41.4 mph; 66.7 km/h)
- Range: 3,450 nmi (6,390 km) at 15 kn (28 km/h)
- Complement: 82
- Armament: 3 × single QF 4-inch (102 mm) Mark IV guns; 1 × single 2-pdr 40 mm (1.6 in) AA gun; 2 × twin 21 in (533 mm) torpedo tubes

HMS Undine was a Modified Admiralty R-class destroyer that served in the Royal Navy during the First World War. The Modified R class added attributes of the Yarrow Later M class to improve the capability of the ships to operate in bad weather. Launched in 1917, the destroyer served in the Grand Fleet until the end of the war. Undine was sold to be broken up in 1927 but was wrecked on the way to the breakers. The wreck was partially visible in 2013.

== Design and development ==
Undine was one of eleven Modified R-class destroyers ordered by the British Admiralty in March 1916 as part of the Eighth War Construction Programme. The design was a development of the existing R class, adding features from the Yarrow Later M class which had been introduced based on wartime experience. The forward two boilers were transposed and vented through a single funnel, enabling the bridge and forward gun to be placed further aft. Combined with hull-strengthening, this improved the destroyers' ability to operate at high speed in bad weather.

Undine was 276 feet (84.1 m) long overall and 265 feet (80.8 m) long between perpendiculars, with a beam of 27 feet (8.2 m) and a draught of 11 feet (3.4 m). Displacement was 1,035 long tons (1,052 t) normal and 1,090 long tons (1,110 t) at deep load. Power was provided by three Yarrow boilers feeding two Brown-Curtis geared steam turbines rated at 27,000 shaft horsepower (20,000 kW) and driving two shafts, to give a design speed of 36 knots (67 km/h; 41 mph). Two funnels were fitted. A total of 296 long tons (301 t) of fuel oil were carried, giving a design range of 3,450 nautical miles (6,390 km; 3,970 mi) at 15 knots (28 km/h; 17 mph).

Armament consisted of three single 4-inch (102 mm) Mk V QF guns on the ship's centreline, with one on the forecastle, one aft on a raised platform and one between the funnels. Increased elevation extended the range of the gun by 1,800 metres (2,000 yd) to 11,000 metres (12,000 yd). A single 2-pounder 40 mm (1.6 in) "pom-pom anti-aircraft gun was carried on a platform between two twin mounts for 21 in (533 mm) torpedoes. The ship had a complement of 82 officers and ratings.

== Construction and careers ==
Laid down by Fairfield Shipbuilding and Engineering Company of Govan on 23 September 1916, Undine was launched on 22 March 1917 and completed on 26 May. The vessel was the sixth of the name.

On commissioning, Undine joined the Fifteenth Destroyer Flotilla of the Grand Fleet, and served there until 1919. When the Grand Fleet was disbanded, Undine was transferred to the Home Fleet, under the flag of King George V, and, on 3 December 1920, carried the dead bodies of members of the Black and Tans killed in the Irish War of Independence to Milford Haven. The destroyer was reduced to reserve on 22 February 1922. However, the Navy decided to retire many of the older destroyers in preparation for the introduction of newer and larger vessels. After being paid off on 28 September 1927, the ship was sold for scrapping to Thos. W. Ward of Briton Ferry in April 1928 but was wrecked en route off Horse Sand Fort, Portsmouth. The wreck was sold to the Middlesbrough Salvage Company on 27 August 1928 and was broken up on site, but the remains were still observable to sonar in 2013.

== Pennant numbers ==
Pennant number	Date
G97	January 1917
G79	January 1918
F03	January 1919
H61	January 1922
