= HMS Tormentor (1917) =

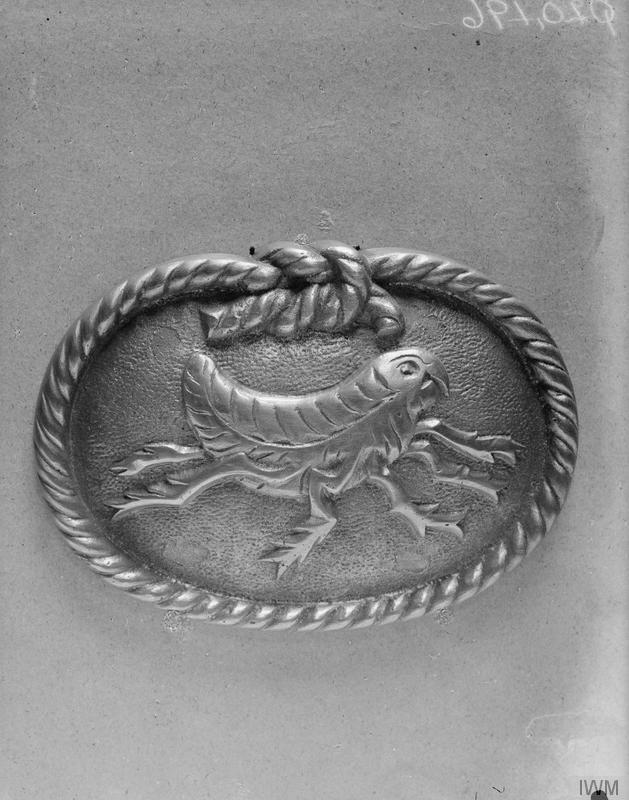
Ship badge of HMS Tormentor.

HMS Tormentor was an R-class destroyer built by Alexander Stephen & Sons in Glasgow, Scotland. The ship is a notable wreck off Old Castle Head, near Manorbier in southern Wales.

The ship was ordered in March 1916.

The ship was launched on 22 May 1917. She saw service during the First World War. The ship engines were from William Beardmore and Company.

The ship was sold for breaking up on 19 November 1929, but was wrecked off South Wales while under tow en route to the breakers yard on 13 December 1929. Parts of the wreck have been recovered, including a brass name plate and speaking tube.
