= HMS Ulysses (1917) =

Destroyer of the Royal Navy

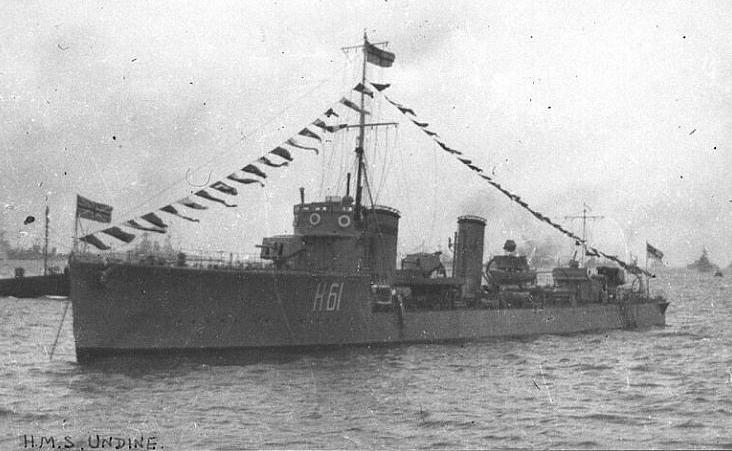
- Sister ship HMS Undine

History

United Kingdom
- Name: HMS Ulysses
- Namesake: Ulysses
- Ordered: March 1916
- Builder: William Doxford & Sons, Sunderland
- Launched: 24 March 1917
- Fate: Sank following collision 29 October 1918

General characteristics
- Class & type: Modified Admiralty R-class destroyer
- Displacement: 1,085 long tons (1,102 t)
- Length: 276 ft (84.1 m)
- Beam: 27 ft (8.2 m)
- Draught: 11 ft (3.4 m)
- Propulsion: 3 Yarrow boilers; 2 geared Parsons steam turbines, 27,000 shp (20,000 kW)
- Speed: 36 knots (41.4 mph; 66.7 km/h)
- Range: 3,450 nmi (6,390 km) at 15 kn (28 km/h)
- Complement: 82
- Armament: 3 × QF 4-inch (101.6 mm) Mark IV guns, mounting P Mk. IX; 1 × single 2-pounder (40-mm) "pom-pom" Mk. II anti-aircraft gun; 4 × 21 in (533 mm) torpedo tubes (2×2)

HMS Ulysses was a Royal Navy modified R-class destroyer constructed and then operational in the First World War. The R class were an improvement on the previous M class with geared steam turbines to improve efficiency. The Modified R class added attributes of the Yarrow Later M class to improve the capability of the ships to operate in bad weather. Built by Doxford and launched in March 1917, the vessel served with the Fifteenth Destroyer Flotilla of the Grand Fleet that escorted convoys that travelled between Britain and Scandinavia. On 29 October 1918, the destroyer struck SS Ellerie in fog and sank. The entire ship's company was rescued.

== Design and description ==
Ulysses was one of eleven modified R-class destroyers ordered by the British Admiralty in March 1916 as part of the Eighth War Construction Programme. The design was a development of the existing R class, adding features from the Yarrow Later M class which had been introduced based on wartime experience. The R class was generally similar to the preceding M class, but differed in having geared steam turbines, the aft gun mounted on a raised platform and minor changes to improve seakeeping. The forward two boilers were transposed and vented through a single funnel, enabling the bridge and forward gun to be placed further aft. Combined with hull-strengthening, this improved the destroyers' ability to operate at high speed in bad weather.

Ulysses was 276 feet (84.1 m) long overall and 265 feet (80.8 m) long between perpendiculars, with a beam of 27 feet (8.2 m) and a draught of 11 feet (3.4 m). Displacement was 1,035 long tons (1,052 t) normal and 1,090 long tons (1,110 t) at deep load. Power was provided by three Yarrow boilers feeding two Parsons geared steam turbines rated at 27,000 shaft horsepower (20,000 kW) and driving two shafts, to give a design speed of 36 knots (67 km/h; 41 mph). Two funnels were fitted. A total of 296 long tons (301 t) of fuel oil were carried, giving a design range of 3,450 nautical miles (6,390 km; 3,970 mi) at 15 knots (28 km/h; 17 mph).

Armament consisted of three single 4-inch (102 mm) Mk V QF guns on the ship's centreline, with one on the forecastle, one aft on a raised platform and one between the funnels. Increased elevation extended the range of the gun by 1,800 metres (2,000 yd) to 11,000 metres (12,000 yd). A single 2-pounder 40 mm (1.6 in) "pom-pom anti-aircraft gun was carried on a platform between two rotating twin mounts for 21 in (533 mm) torpedoes. The destroyer was fitted with racks and storage for depth charges. Initially, only two depth charges were carried but the number increased in service and by 1918, the vessel was carrying between 30 and 50 depth charges. The ship had a complement of 82 officers and ratings.

== Construction and career ==
Ulysses was built by William Doxford & Sons in Sunderland and launched 24 March 1917. On commissioning, Salmon joined the Fifteenth Destroyer Flotilla of the Grand Fleet based at Scapa Flow. The flotilla was assigned to escort convoys that travelled between Britain and Scandinavia, protecting them from German submarines. By 31 March 1917, the flotilla had moved to Rosyth. During that time, the German submarine tactics had changed from using gunfire, so that, by April, over half of the merchant vessels sunk had been hit by torpedoes. This also led to an increase in the number of ships lost. The flotilla took part in anti-submarine patrols between 15 and 24 June 1917. Although sixty-one sightings of submarines and twelve attacks were reported during that operation, no submarines were sunk.

Ulysses remained with the Fifteenth Destroyer Flotilla into 1918. The vessel was sunk following a collision on 29 October 1918 with the SS Ellerie in the Firth of Clyde. (Note: Elleric according to Hepper) However she sank without loss of life, with the ship's crew being rescued by the drifter Ivy III. Due to wartime security restrictions her sinking position is unknown. It is stated that the collision occurred in fog.

== Pendant numbers ==
| Pennant number | Date |
|---|---|
| F80 | January 1917 |
| G77 | March 1918 |
| G96 | January 1918 |
