= HMS Tancred (1917) =

British R-Class destroyer, WW1

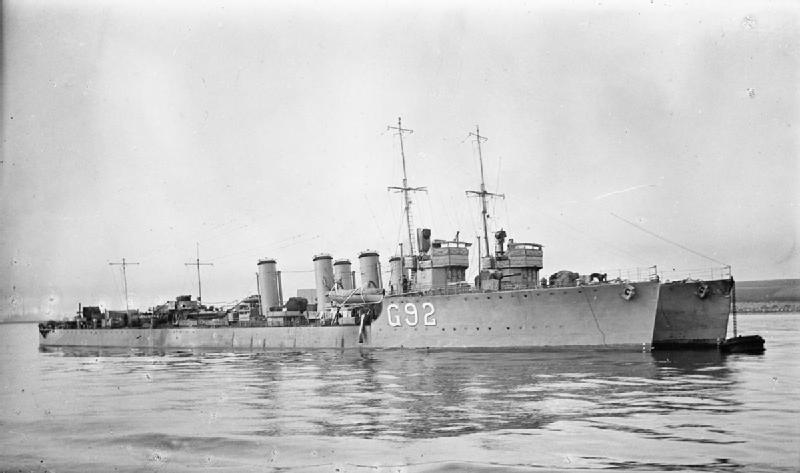
- Two R-class destroyers, sister ship HMS Rob Roy nearest

History

United Kingdom
- Name: HMS Tancred
- Ordered: July 1915
- Builder: William Beardmore and Company, Dalmuir
- Yard number: 556
- Laid down: 5 November 1916
- Launched: 30 June 1917
- Completed: 1 September 1917
- Out of service: 17 May 1928
- Home port: `
- Fate: Sold to be broken up

General characteristics
- Class & type: R-class destroyer
- Displacement: 975 long tons (991 t) (normal); 1,065 long tons (1,082 t) (deep load)
- Length: 273 ft 6 in (83.4 m) (o.a.)
- Beam: 26 ft 9 in (8.15 m)
- Draught: 8 ft 5 in (2.57 m)
- Installed power: 3 Yarrow boilers; 27,000 shp (20,000 kW)
- Propulsion: 2 geared Brown-Curtis steam turbines
- Speed: 36 knots (66.7 km/h; 41.4 mph)
- Range: 3,450 nmi (6,390 km; 3,970 mi) at 15 knots (28 km/h; 17 mph)
- Complement: 82
- Armament: 3 × QF 4 in (102 mm) Mark IV guns; 1 × 2-pdr (40 mm) "pom-pom" Mk. II anti-aircraft gun; 4 × 21 in (533 mm) torpedo tubes (2×2)

HMS Tancred was an R-class destroyer which served with the Royal Navy during the First World War. The R class were an improvement on the previous M class with geared steam turbines to improve efficiency. Launched by Beardmore of Dalmuir on 30 June 1917, Tancred initially joined the Grand Fleet, serving as part of a flotilla that took part in one of the last naval actions of the war, although in this case the British vessels did not engage with the German High Seas Fleet. After the signing of the Armistice that ended the war and the dissolution of the Grand Fleet, the destroyer was initially transferred to the Home Fleet. However, within a year, Tancred had been allocated to the local defence flotilla at Firth of Forth. Despite being at a reduced complement as an economy measure, further reductions in fleet costs meant that the destroyer was retired. On 17 May 1928, Tancred was sold to be broken up.

== Design and development ==
Tancred was one of twenty-three R-class destroyer delivered to the British Admiralty as part of the Eighth War Construction Programme. The design was generally similar to the preceding M class, but differed in having geared steam turbines, the aft gun mounted on a raised platform and minor changes to improve seakeeping.

The destroyer had an overall length of 273 feet 6 inches (83.36 m), with a beam of 26 feet 9 inches (8.15 m) and a draught of 8 feet 6 inches (2.59 m). Displacement was 975 long tons (991 t) normal and 1,065 long tons (1,082 t) deep load. Power was provided by three Yarrow boilers feeding two Brown-Curtis geared turbines rated at 27,000 shaft horsepower (20,000 kW) and driving two shafts, to give a design speed of 36 knots (67 km/h; 41 mph). Three funnels were fitted. A total of 296 long tons (301 t) of fuel oil was carried, giving a design range of 3,450 nautical miles (6,390 km; 3,970 mi) at 15 knots (28 km/h; 17 mph).

Armament consisted of three QF 4in Mk IV guns on the ship's centreline, with one on the forecastle, one aft on a raised platform and one between the second and third funnels. A single 2-pounder (40 mm) pom-pom anti-aircraft gun was carried, while torpedo armament consisted of two twin mounts for 21 in (533 mm) torpedoes. The ship had a complement of 82 officers and ratings.

== Construction and career ==
Ordered in March 1916 at a contract price of £172,316, Tancred was laid down at the William Beardmore and Company shipyard in Dalmuir with the yard number 556 on 6 July 1916. Launched on 30 June the following year and completed on 1 September, the destroyer was the first ship named for the Christian knight in Torquato Tasso's poem Jerusalem Delivered, a fictional character based on Tancred, Prince of Galilee. Tancred was deployed as part of the Grand Fleet, joining the Eleventh Destroyer Flotilla. The flotilla took part in the Royal Navy's engagement with one of the final sorties of the German High Seas Fleet during the First World War, on 24 April 1918, although the two fleets did not actually meet and the destroyer returned unharmed.

After the Armistice of 11 November 1918 that ended the war and the dissolution of the Grand Fleet, Tancred joined the Fifth Destroyer Flotilla of the Home Fleet. However, the destroyer did not serve long there for the end of the war meant that the navy needed to move to a peacetime level of mobilisation. Both the number of ships and the amount of staff needed to be reduced to save money. By the middle of 1919, the destroyer had been redeployed to the local defence flotilla at the Firth of Forth, but at a reduced complement. During the following years, further cuts were made to the fleet. In 1923, the Navy decided to scrap many of the older destroyers in preparation for the introduction of newer and larger vessels. It was then decided that Tancred would be one of these to be retired. The destroyer was sold to Cashmore of Newport, Wales, on 17 May 1928 to be broken up at Port Talbot.

== Pennant numbers ==
Pennant number	Date
F85	January 1917
G08	January 1918
G07	April 1918
G79	January 1919
F12	December 1920
H67	January 1922
