= HMS Ursula (1917) =

Destroyer of the Royal Navy

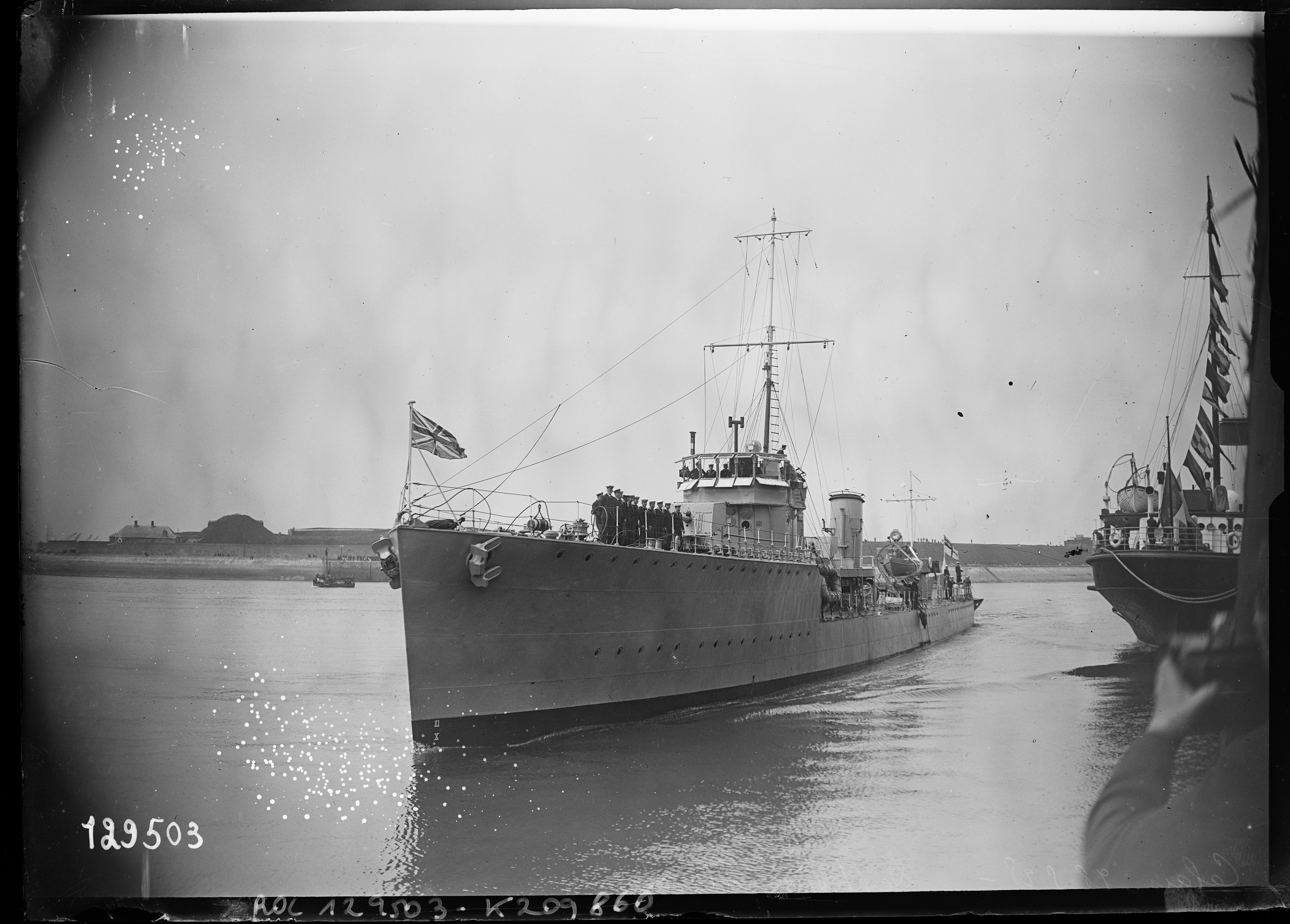
- HMS Ursula in Calais, May 1928

History

United Kingdom
- Name: HMS Ursula
- Ordered: March 1916
- Builder: Scotts Shipbuilding and Engineering Company, Greenock
- Yard number: 480
- Laid down: 22 September 1916
- Launched: 21 April 1917
- Completed: 26 September 1917
- Out of service: 19 November 1929
- Fate: Sold to be broken up

General characteristics
- Class & type: Modified Admiralty R-class destroyer
- Displacement: 1,035 long tons (1,052 t) (normal)
- Length: 276 ft (84.1 m) (o.a.)
- Beam: 27 ft (8.2 m)
- Draught: 11 ft (3.4 m)
- Propulsion: 3 Yarrow boilers; 2 geared Brown-Curtis steam turbines, 27,000 shp (20,000 kW)
- Speed: 36 knots (41 mph; 67 km/h)
- Range: 3,450 nmi (6,390 km) at 15 kn (28 km/h)
- Complement: 82
- Armament: 3 × single QF 4-inch (102 mm) Mark IV guns; 1 × single 2-pdr 40 mm (1.6 in) AA gun; 2 × twin 21 in (533 mm) torpedo tubes

HMS Ursula was a Modified Admiralty R-class destroyer that served in the Royal Navy. The Modified R class added attributes of the Yarrow Later M class to improve the capability of the ships to operate in bad weather. The vessel was launched in 1917 at Greenock in Scotland and served with the Grand Fleet during the First World War. After the war, the destroyer was transferred to the Home Fleet, but then moved to the Reserve Fleet. In 1924, Prince George served aboard Ursula before, in 1929, the vessel was sold to be broken up.

== Design and development ==
Ursula was one of eleven Modified R-class destroyers ordered by the British Admiralty in March 1916 as part of the Eighth War Construction Programme. The design was a development of the existing R class, adding features from the Yarrow Later M class which had been introduced based on wartime experience. The forward two boilers were transposed and vented through a single funnel, enabling the bridge and forward gun to be placed further aft. Combined with hull-strengthening, this improved the destroyers' ability to operate at high speed in bad weather.

Ursula was 276 feet (84.1 m) long overall and 265 feet (80.8 m) long between perpendiculars, with a beam of 27 feet (8.2 m) and a draught of 11 feet (3.4 m). Displacement was 1,035 long tons (1,052 t) normal and 1,076 long tons (1,093 t) at deep load. Power was provided by three Yarrow boilers feeding two Brown-Curtis geared steam turbines rated at 27,000 shaft horsepower (20,000 kW) and driving two shafts, to give a design speed of 36 knots (67 km/h; 41 mph). Two funnels were fitted. A total of 296 long tons (301 t) of fuel oil were carried, giving a design range of 3,450 nautical miles (6,390 km; 3,970 mi) at 15 knots (28 km/h; 17 mph).

Armament consisted of three single 4-inch (102 mm) Mk V QF guns on the ship's centreline, with one on the forecastle, one aft on a raised platform and one between the funnels. Increased elevation extended the range of the gun by 1,800 metres (2,000 yd) to 11,000 metres (12,000 yd). A single 2-pounder 40 mm (1.6 in) "pom-pom" anti-aircraft gun was carried on a platform between two twin mounts for 21 in (533 mm) torpedoes. The ship had a complement of 82 officers and ratings.

== Construction and careers ==
Laid down on 22 September 1916 by Scotts at Greenock with the yard number 480, Ursula was launched on 21 April 1917 and completed on 26 September. The vessel was the first of the name. On commissioning, Ursula joined the Thirteenth Destroyer Flotilla of the Grand Fleet. The flotilla took part in the Royal Navy's engagement with one of the final sorties of the German High Seas Fleet during the First World War, on 24 April 1918, although the two fleets did not actually meet and the destroyer saw no action.

At the end of the war, Ursula was still part of the Thirteenth Destroyer Flotilla under the cruiser Champion. The vessel was transferred to the Fifth Destroyer Flotilla under the flag of King George V when the Home Fleet was formed, but was reduced to the Reserve Fleet on 23 August 1920. On 18 July 1924, the destroyer was briefly the home for Prince George, who served as an acting midshipman during a naval review. However, the Navy decided to retire many of the older destroyers in preparation for the introduction of newer and larger vessels. The destroyer was one of those selected and was sold to Cashmore of Newport, Wales, on 19 November 1929 and broken up.

== Pennant numbers ==
Pennant number	Date
F88	September 1917
F84	January 1918
F01	March 1918
H11	January 1922
