= HMS Thisbe (1917) =

Destroyer of the Royal Navy

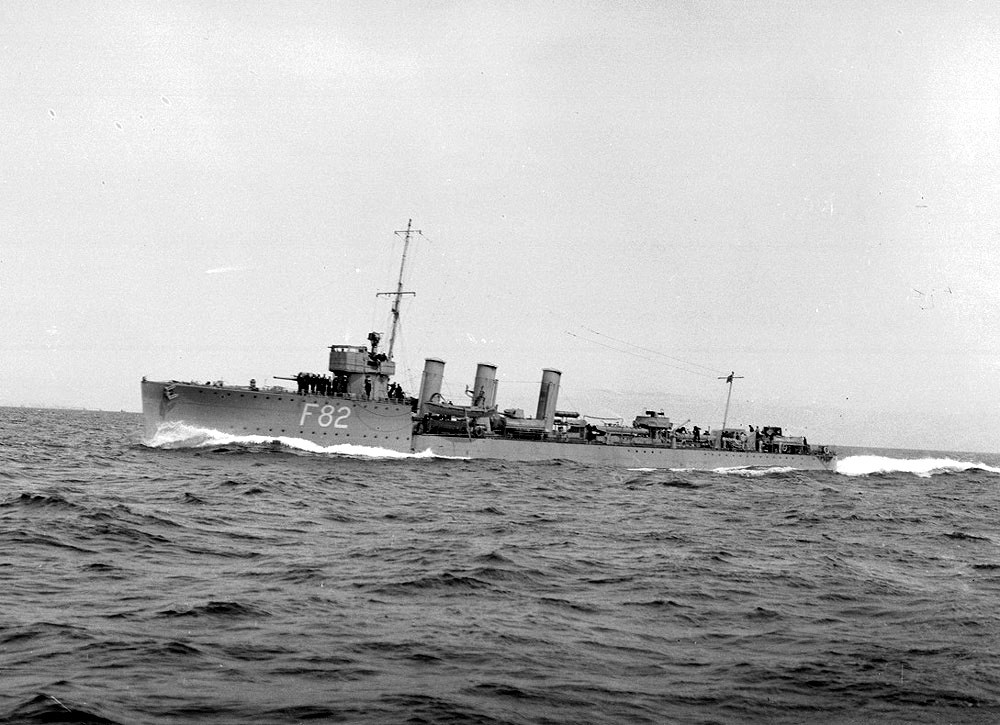
- HMS Thisbe at sea in 1917

History

United Kingdom
- Name: HMS Thisbe
- Builder: Hawthorn Leslie and Company, Hebburn
- Yard number: 492
- Laid down: June 1916
- Launched: 8 March 1917
- Commissioned: 6 June 1917
- Fate: Sold to be broken up 31 August 1936

General characteristics
- Class & type: R-class destroyer
- Displacement: 975 long tons (991 t) normal; 1,035 long tons (1,052 t) full load
- Length: 265 ft (80.8 m) p.p.
- Beam: 26 feet 9 inches (8.15 m)
- Draught: 9 ft 10 in (3.00 m)
- Propulsion: 3 Yarrow boilers; 2 geared Parsons steam turbines, 27,000 shp (20,000 kW)
- Speed: 36 knots (41.4 mph; 66.7 km/h)
- Range: 3,450 nmi (6,390 km) at 15 kn (28 km/h)
- Complement: 82
- Armament: 3 × single QF 4-inch (102 mm) Mark IV guns; 1 × single 2-pdr 40 mm (1.6 in) AA gun; 2 × twin 21 in (533 mm) torpedo tubes

HMS Thisbe was an R-class destroyer which served in the Royal Navy during World War I. The R class were an improvement on the previous M class with geared steam turbines to improve efficiency. Built by Hawthorn Leslie and launched on 8 March 1917, the destroyer served as part of the Harwich Force. In 1918, the destroyer towed a flying boat on a lighter to take part in operations off the coast of Heligoland, although the aircraft failed to take off. After the war, the destroyer was placed in reserve. After being part of a naval review in front of George V in 1924, the destroyer participated in trials of different compasses with the Compass Department in 1925. The ship was sold to be broken up on 31 August 1936.

== Design ==
Thisbe was one of twelve R-class destroyers ordered by the British Admiralty in March 1916 as part of the Eighth War Construction Programme. The R class were a development of the preceding M-class, but differed in having geared turbines to improve fuel consumption, the central gun mounted on a bandstand and minor changes to improve seakeeping.

The destroyer was 265 feet (80.77 m) long between perpendiculars, with a beam of 26 feet 9 inches (8.15 m) and a draught of 9 feet 10 inches (3.00 m). Displacement was 975 long tons (991 t) normal and 1,035 long tons (1,052 t) deep load. Power was provided by three Yarrow boilers feeding two Parsons geared steam turbines rated at 27,000 shaft horsepower (20,000 kW) and driving two shafts, to give a design speed of 36 knots (67 km/h; 41 mph). Three funnels were fitted. A total of 296 long tons (301 t) of oil was carried, giving a design range of 3,450 nautical miles (6,390 km; 3,970 mi) at 15 knots (28 km/h; 17 mph).

Armament consisted of three 4 in (100 mm) Mk IV QF guns on the ship's centreline, with one on the forecastle, one aft on a raised platform and one between the second and third funnels. A single 2-pounder 40 mm (1.6 in) "pom-pom" anti-aircraft gun was carried, while torpedo armament consisted of two rotating twin mounts for 21 in (533 mm) torpedoes. The destroyer was fitted with racks and storage for depth charges. Initially, only two depth charges were carried but the number increased in service and by 1918, the vessel was carrying between 30 and 50 depth charges. The ship had a complement of 82 officers and ratings.

== Service ==
The ship was laid down by Hawthorn Leslie and Company in Hebburn on 13 June 1916 with the yard number 492. Launched on 8 March 1917, the destroyer was completed on 6 June 1917. The vessel was the third to be named after Thisbe, a woman of Babylon from Greek mythology.

On commissioning, Thisbe joined the Tenth Destroyer Flotilla of the Harwich Force. The deployment was part of a wider expansion of the destroyer force in the navy. Towards the end of the war, the Navy looked to alternative ways of attacking the Germans, particularly the fast but short range Thornycroft Coastal Motor Boats and Curtis Large American flying boats. A lighter was developed that could be towed by destroyers, taking the faster craft close to the enemy. On 10 August 1918, Thisbe, towing a flying boat on a lighter and accompanied by six Coastal Motor Boats, joined a fleet of four light cruisers and thirteen destroyers to sail for Heligoland and attack German shipping. Initially, the assignment was not a success as the aircraft failed to take off and the boats were all sunk or interned, but subsequently one of the aircraft launched by one of the other destroyers shot down the Zeppelin LZ 100.

After the Armistice of 11 November that ended the war, the Royal Navy returned to a peacetime level of strength and both the number of ships and the amount of personnel in service needed to be reduced to save money. Thisbe initially remained part of the Tenth Destroyer Flotilla, but was placed in reserve at Nore on 24 February 1920. On 26 July 1924, the vessel was briefly taken out of reserve to participate in a naval review in front of George V. On 17 November, the vessel completed a refit.

The destroyer was attached to the Compass Department the following year, and took part of a trial of six different compasses, including a gunnery compass. However, the vessel's return to service was brief. On 22 April 1930, the London Naval Treaty was signed, which limited total destroyer tonnage in the Royal Navy. The force was looking to introduce more modern destroyers and so needed to retire some of the older vessels. On 31 August 1936, Thisbe was one of the destroyers given to Thos. W. Ward of Sheffield in exchange for RMS Majestic and was subsequently broken up at Pembroke Dock.

== Pennant numbers ==
Pennant number	Date
F82	September 1915
F75	January 1918
G80	January 1919
H72	December 1919
