= R-class destroyer (1916) =

Class of 62 British destroyers, built 1916–17

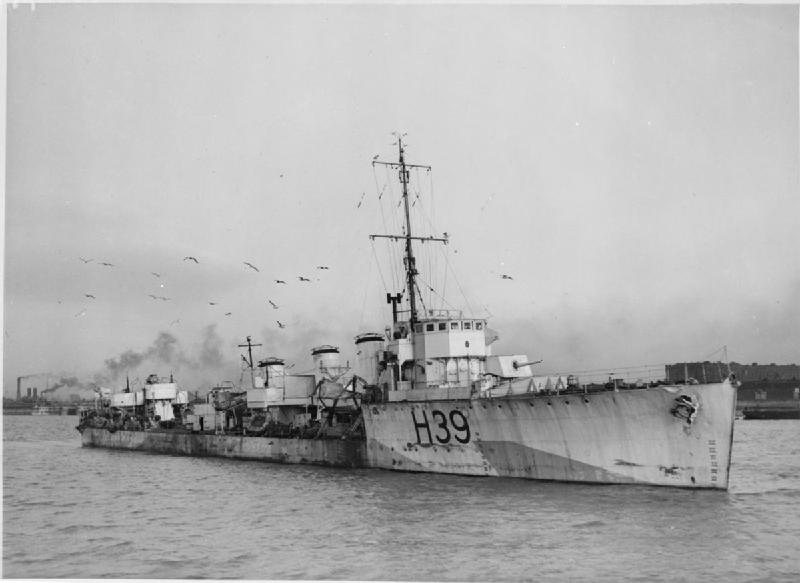
- HMS Skate in 1942

Class overview
- Name: R class
- Operators: Royal Navy; Royal Thai Navy
- Preceded by: Admiralty M class
- Succeeded by: Admiralty V class; S class
- Built: 1916–1917
- In commission: 1916–1957
- Completed: 62
- Lost: 8
- Preserved: 1 (HMS Radiant, transferred to Royal Siamese Navy in 1920 and renamed Phra Ruang, survives as hulk

General characteristics
- Type: Destroyer
- Displacement: 975 long tons (991 t) standard; 1,035 long tons (1,052 t) built by Thornycroft; 930 long tons (940 t) built by Yarrow
- Length: 276 ft (84.1 m)
- Beam: 26 ft 9 in (8.15 m)
- Draught: 9 ft 10 in (3.00 m)
- Propulsion: 3 boilers; 2 geared Brown Curtis steam turbines, 27,000 shp
- Speed: 36 knots (41.4 mph; 66.7 km/h)
- Range: 3,440 nmi (6,370 km) at 15 kn (28 km/h)
- Complement: 82
- Armament: 3 × QF 4-inch (101.6 mm) Mark IV guns, mounting P Mk. IX; 1 × single 2-pounder (40-mm) "pom-pom" Mk. II anti-aircraft gun; 4 × 21 in (533 mm) torpedo tubes (2×2)

The first R class were a class of 62 destroyers built between 1916 and 1917 for the Royal Navy. They were an improvement, specifically in the area of fuel economy, of the earlier Admiralty M-class destroyers. The most important difference was that the Admiralty R class had two shafts and geared turbines, compared with the three shafts and direct turbines of the Admiralty M class, but in appearance the R class could be distinguished from its predecessors by having the after 4-inch gun mounted in a bandstand. The Admiralty ordered the first two of this class of ships in May 1915. Another seventeen were ordered in July 1915, a further eight in December 1915, and a final twenty-three in March 1916 (of which eleven were to a slightly modified design).

As well as these fifty ships to the standard 'Admiralty' design, twelve more R class were designed and built by the two specialist builders Yarrow Shipbuilders and John I. Thornycroft & Company to their own separate designs. Three were ordered from Thornycroft and four from Yarrow in July 1915, and two from Thornycroft and three from Yarrow in December 1915.

They were the last three-funnelled destroyers ordered by the Royal Navy (although HMS Bristol commissioned in 1973 had three funnels, these were not all on the centreline). All of these ships saw extensive service in World War I. Some saw service as minelayers. Eight R-class ships were sunk during the war and all but two of the surviving ships were scrapped in the 1920s and 1930s. One Admiralty R-class vessel, HMS Skate, survived to see service in World War II as a convoy escort, making her the oldest destroyer to see wartime service with the Royal Navy. A second, HMS Radiant was transferred to the Royal Siamese Navy as Phra Ruang in September 1920.

== Ships in class ==
The ships of this class were ordered under the 5th through 8th War Emergency Programmes through which the government funded the United Kingdom's increased ship production during World War I. The first two prototypes of this class were ordered in May 1915 as part of the 5th War Programme and larger numbers followed, as summarized in the following table:

War Programme	Ordered	Admiralty R	Admiralty Modified R	Thornycroft R	Yarrow R
5	May 1915	2	-	-	-
6	July 1915	17	-	3	4
7	December 1915	8	-	2	-
8	March 1916	12	11	-	3

=== Admiralty R-class destroyers ===
Name	Pennant	Builder	Laid down	Launched	Commissioned	Disposed	Status	Ref
5th War Programme order in May 1915 (2 ships)
Radstock	D94, H64, G76, G79, G81	Swan Hunter & Wigham Richardson	6 September 1915	8 June 1916	20 September 1916	29 April 1927	Sold for scrap	
Raider	D95, G41, G81, G82, G86	Swan Hunter & Wigham Richardson	October 1915	17 July 1916	October 1916	29 April 1927	Sold for scrap	
6th War Programme order in July 1915 (17 ships)
Romola	G15, G18, G53, G83	John Brown & Company, Clydebank	25 August 1915	14 May 1916	17 August 1916	13 March 1930	Scrapped	
Rowena	D84, F45, H85, G81, G90	John Brown & Company, Clydebank	25 August 1915	1 July 1916	29 September 1916	27 January 1937	Scrapped	
Restless	G85, G88	John Brown & Company, Clydebank	22 September 1915	12 August 1916	21 October 1916	23 November 1936	Scrapped	
Rigorous	G86, G90	John Brown & Company, Clydebank	22 September 1915	30 September 1916	30 November 1916	5 November 1926	Scrapped	
Rocket	G43, G82, G88, H76	William Denny and Brothers, Dumbarton	28 September 1915	2 July 1916	7 October 1916	16 December 1926	Scrapped	
Rob Roy		William Denny and Brothers, Dumbarton	15 October 1915	29 August 1916	15 December 1916	13 July 1926	Scrapped	
Redgauntlet	F51, F58, F97, FA4	William Denny and Brothers, Dumbarton	28 September 1915	23 November 1916	7 February 1917	July 1927	Scrapped	
Redoubt	F56, F57	William Doxford & Sons, Sunderland		28 October 1916		13 July 1926	Scrapped	
Recruit		William Doxford & Sons, Sunderland		9 December 1916	April 1917	9 August 1917	Sunk by submarine	
Sable	G44, G91, H93	J. Samuel White, Cowes		26 June 1916	30 November 1916	August 1927	Scrapped	
Setter	F55, G98	J. Samuel White, Cowes		18 August 1916	12 February 1917	17 May 1917	Sunk after collision	
Salmon (renamed Sable)	F18, G93, G94, H36, H58	Harland and Wolff, Govan	27 August 1915	7 October 1916	20 December 1916	28 January 1937	Sold for scrap	
Sylph	D93, F54, F68, G69, H0A	Harland and Wolff, Govan	30 August 1916	15 November 1916	10 February 1917	16 December 1926	Sold for scrap	
Sarpedon	F15, G14, G19, G21, G82	R. & W. Hawthorn, Leslie and Company, Hebburn on Tyne	27 September 1915	1 June 1916	2 September 1916	23 July 1926	Sold for scrap	
Sorceress	G68, G93, G94, H66	Swan Hunter & Wigham Richardson, Wallsend-on-Tyne	13 November 1915	29 August 1916	4 December 1916	29 April 1927	Sold for scrap	
Sturgeon	F47, F49, G17	Alexander Stephen and Sons, Linthouse, Govan	10 November 1915	11 January 1917	26 February 1917	16 December 1926	Sold for scrap	
Sceptre	F60, F79	Alexander Stephen and Sons, Linthouse, Govan	10 November 1915	18 April 1917	26 May 1917	1926	Sold for scrap	
7th War Programme order in December 1915 (8 ships)
Satyr	F51, F59, G52, H78	William Beardmore and Company, Dalmuir	April 1916	27 December 1916	2 February 1917	16 December 1926	Sold for scrap	
Sharpshooter	F48, F61	William Beardmore and Company, Dalmuir	May 1916	27 February 1917	2 April 1917	29 April 1927	Sold for scrap	
Simoom		John Brown & Company, Clydebank	23 May 1916	30 October 1916	22 December 1916	23 January 1917	Sunk by torpedo boat	
Skate		John Brown & Company, Clydebank	12 January 1916	11 January 1917	19 February 1917	1947	Sold for scrap	
Skilful		Harland and Wolff, Govan		3 February 1917		13 July 1926	Sold for scrap	
Springbok		Harland and Wolff, Govan	27 January 1916	9 March 1917	30 April 1917	16 December 1926	Sold for scrap	
Starfish	F60, F64, G50, H70		R. & W. Hawthorn, Leslie and Company, Hebburn on Tyne	27 September 1916		21 April 1928	Sold for scrap	
Stork	F65, F66, G60, H90	R. & W. Hawthorn, Leslie and Company, Hebburn on Tyne	10 April 1916	25 November 1916	1 February 1917	7 October 1927	Sold for scrap	
8th War Programme order in March 1916 (12 ships)
Tancred	F12, F85, G07, G08, G79, H67	William Beardmore and Company, Dalmuir	5 November 1916	30 June 1917	1 September 1917	17 May 1928	Sold for scrap	
Tarpon	F22, F65, F72, F79, H97	John Brown & Company, Clydebank	12 April 1916	10 March 1917	April 1917	4 August 1927	Sold for scrap	
Telemachus	F23, F66, F81, F86, H98	John Brown & Company, Clydebank	12 April 1916	21 April 1917	June 1917	July 1927	Sold for scrap	
Tempest		Fairfield Shipbuilding and Engineering Company		26 January 1917	April 1917	January 1937	Sold for scrap	
Tenacious	F96, G02, G61, H1A	Harland and Wolff, Govan; J. Samuel White, Cowes	25 July 1916	21 March 1917	12 August 1917	26 June 1928	Sold for scrap	
Tetrarch	F74, F87, G54, H59	Harland and Wolff, Govan; J. Samuel White, Cowes	26 July 1916	20 April 1917	2 June 1917	28 July 1934	Sold for scrap	
Thisbe	F75, F82, G80, H72	R. & W. Hawthorn, Leslie and Company, Hebburn on Tyne	June 1916	8 March 1917	6 June 1917	31 August 1936	Sold for scrap	
Thruster	F74, F76, G81, H73	R. & W. Hawthorn, Leslie and Company, Hebburn on Tyne	2 June 1916	10 January 1917	30 March 1917	16 March 1937	Sold for scrap	
Tormentor		Alexander Stephen and Sons, Linthouse, Govan		22 May 1917		19 November 1929	Sold for scrap; sunk in transit	
Tornado		Alexander Stephen and Sons, Linthouse, Govan		4 August 1917	November 1917	23 December 1917	Sunk by mines	
Torrent		Swan Hunter & Wigham Richardson, Wallsend-on-Tyne		26 November 1916	February 1917	23 December 1917	Sunk by mines	
Torrid		Swan Hunter & Wigham Richardson, Wallsend-on-Tyne	19 July 1916	10 February 1917	5 May 1917	27 January 1937	Sunk by mines	

=== Admiralty Modified R-class destroyers ===
The remaining eleven ships ordered in March 1916 were of the Admiralty Modified R class with a slightly increased breadth of 27 ft, a draught of 11 ft, and a tonnage of 1,085. These ships had two funnels.

Name	Pennant	Builder	Laid down	Launched	Commissioned	Disposed	Status	Ref
8th War Programme order in March 1916 (11 ships)
Trenchant	G78, G96	J. Samuel White, Cowes		23 December 1916	30 April 1917	15 November 1928	Sold for scrap	
Tristram	F11, F25, F89	J. Samuel White, Cowes	23 September 1916	24 February 1917	30 June 1917	9 May 1921	Sold for scrap	
Tirade	F07, F81, G80, HA7	Scotts Shipbuilding and Engineering Company, Greenock	1 May 1916	21 April 1917	30 June 1917	15 November 1921	Sold for scrap	
Tower		Swan Hunter & Wigham Richardson, Wallsend-on-Tyne	September 1916	5 April 1917		17 May 1928	Sold for scrap	
Ulster	F01, F17, F91, H09	William Beardmore and Company, Dalmuir		10 October 1917	21 November 1917	21 April 1928	Sold for scrap	
Ulysses		William Doxford & Sons, Sunderland		24 March 1917		29 October 1918	Sunk following collision	
Umpire	F02, F26, F94, H10	William Doxford & Sons, Sunderland		9 June 1917	August 1917	7 January 1930	Sold for scrap	
Undine	F03, G79, G97, H61	Fairfield Shipbuilding and Engineering Company	23 September 1916	22 March 1917	26 May 1917	28 September 1927	Sold for scrap; sunk in transit	
Urchin	F04, F99, H62	Palmers Shipbuilding and Iron Company		7 June 1917	August 1917	7 January 1930	Sold for scrap	
Ursa	F05, F10, H63	Palmers Shipbuilding and Iron Company		23 July 1917	16 October 1917	13 July 1926	Sold for scrap	
Ursula	F01, F84, F88, H11	Scotts Shipbuilding and Engineering Company, Greenock	22 September 1916	21 April 1917	26 September 1917	19 November 1929	Sold for scrap	

=== Thornycroft R-class ships ===
Name	Pennant	Builder	Laid down	Launched	Commissioned	Disposed	Status	Ref
6th War Programme order in July 1915 (3 ships)
Rosalind	D87, G64, G89, G95	John I. Thornycroft & Company, Woolston	October 1915	14 October 1916	December 1916	13 July 1926	Sold for scrap	
Radiant		John I. Thornycroft & Company, Woolston		25 November 1916	February 1917	21 June 1920	Sold to Thailand as Phra Ruang	
Retriever		John I. Thornycroft & Company, Woolston		15 January 1917		26 July 1927	Sold for scrap	
7th War Programme order in December 1915 (2 ships)
Taurus	D82, F39, F70, F71, H30	John I. Thornycroft & Company, Woolston	March 1916	10 March 1917	May 1917	18 February 1930	Sold for scrap	
Teazer	D83, F40, F71, F93, H17	John I. Thornycroft & Company, Woolston	March 1916	21 April 1917	July 1917	6 February 1931	Sold for scrap	

Only a single R-class destroyer was passed on from the Royal Navy for service in another service:

Name	Former name	Operator	Service entry	Service exit	Status	Ref
Phra Ruang	ex-Radiant	Royal Thai Navy	September 1920	1957	Stricken	

=== Yarrow R-class ships ===
These seven ships built by Yarrow Shipbuilders were sometimes classified as the Yarrow Later M-class destroyer. These ships had two funnels.

Name	Pennant	Builder	Laid down	Launched	Commissioned	Disposed	Status	Ref
6th War Programme order in July 1915 (4 ships)
Sabrina		Yarrow Shipbuilders	August 1915	24 July 1916	September 1916	5 November 1926	Sold for scrap	
Strongbow		Yarrow Shipbuilders		30 September 1916	November 1916	17 October 1917	Sunk by cruisers	
Surprise		Yarrow Shipbuilders		25 November 1916	February 1917	23 December 1917	Sunk by mines	
Sybille		Yarrow Shipbuilders	August 1915	5 February 1917	February 1917	5 November 1926	Sold for scrap	
8th War Programme order in March 1916 (3 ships)
Truculent		Yarrow Shipbuilders	March 1916	24 March 1917	May 1917	29 April 1927	Sold for scrap	
Tyrant		Yarrow Shipbuilders	March 1916	19 May 1917	July 1917	April 1938	Sold for scrap	
Ulleswater		Yarrow Shipbuilders	1916	4 August 1917		15 August 1918	Sunk by submarine	

== See also ==
- List of destroyer classes of the Royal Navy

== Bibliography ==
- Colledge, J. J.; Warlow, Ben (2006) [1969]. Ships of the Royal Navy: The Complete Record of All Fighting Ships of the Royal Navy from the 15th Century to the Present (3rd Rev ed.). London: Chatham Publishing. ISBN 978-1-86176-281-8. OCLC 67375475.
- British Destroyers: A History of Development, 1892–1953 Drawn by Admiralty Permission from Official Records and Returns, Ships' Covers and Building Plans, Edgar J. March 1966, Seeley, Service & Co OCLC 468636240.
- Destroyers of the Royal Navy, 1893–1981, Maurice Cocker, 1983, Ian Allan ISBN 0-7110-1075-7
- British Destroyers, From Earliest Days to the Second World War Norman Friedman, 2009, ISBN 978-1-84832-049-9
