= HMS Romola =

Destroyer of the Royal Navy

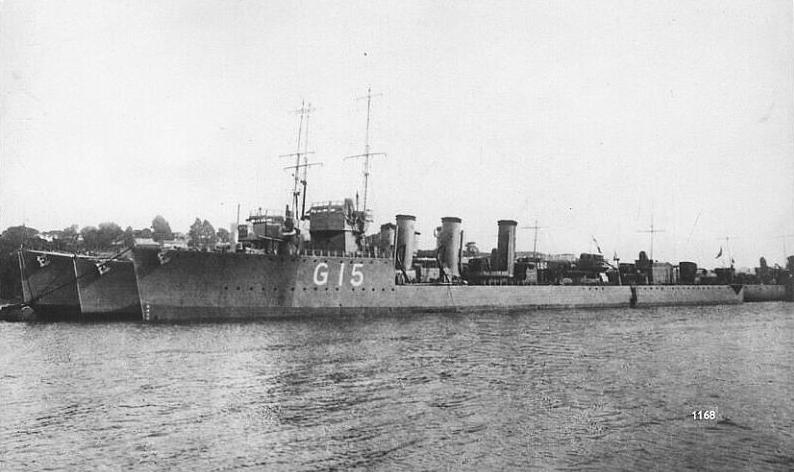
- HMS Romola with two other R-class destroyers

History

United Kingdom
- Name: HMS Romola
- Builder: John Brown & Company, Clydebank
- Yard number: 449
- Laid down: 25 August 1915
- Launched: 14 May 1916
- Commissioned: 17 August 1916
- Decommissioned: 13 March 1930
- Fate: Broken up

General characteristics
- Class & type: R-class destroyer
- Displacement: 975 long tons (991 t) normal; 1,173 long tons (1,192 t) deep load
- Length: 265 ft (80.8 m) p.p.
- Beam: 26 ft 9 in (8.15 m)
- Draught: 9 ft 10 in (3.00 m)
- Propulsion: 3 Yarrow boilers; 2 geared Brown-Curtis steam turbines, 27,000 shp (20,000 kW)
- Speed: 36 knots (41.4 mph; 66.7 km/h)
- Range: 3,450 nmi (6,390 km) at 15 kn (28 km/h)
- Complement: 82
- Armament: 3 × QF 4-inch (101.6 mm) Mark IV guns, mounting P Mk. IX; 1 × single 2-pounder (40-mm) "pom-pom" Mk. II anti-aircraft gun; 4 × 21 in (533 mm) torpedo tubes (2×2)

HMS Romola was an R-class destroyer which served with the Royal Navy during World War I. Launched on 14 May 1916, the ship operated as part of the Grand Fleet, operating as part of a destroyer flotilla. The ship sailed to intercept the German High Seas Fleet in what would be one of the last major expeditions of their Navy in the war but saw no action. After the conflict, the destroyer was held in reserve until being retired and sold to be broken up on 13 March 1930.

== Design and development ==
Romola was one of seventeen R-class destroyers ordered by the British Admiralty in July 1915 as part of the Sixth War Construction Programme. A development of the preceding M-class, the design differed primarily in utilising geared turbines to improve fuel consumption. Comparative trials with Norman showed a 15% saving in fuel at 15 knots (28 km/h; 17 mph) and 28% at 15 knots (28 km/h; 17 mph).

The destroyer was 265 feet (80.77 m) long between perpendiculars, with a beam of 26 feet 9 inches (8.15 m) and a draught of 9 feet 10 inches (3.00 m). Displacement was 975 long tons (991 t) normal and 1,173 long tons (1,192 t) deep load. Power was provided by three Yarrow boilers feeding two Brown-Curtis geared steam turbines rated at 27,000 shaft horsepower (20,000 kW) and driving two shafts, to give a design speed of 36 knots (67 km/h; 41 mph). Three funnels were fitted. A total of 296 long tons (301 t) of fuel oil was carried, giving a design range of 3,450 nautical miles (6,390 km; 3,970 mi) at 15 knots (28 km/h; 17 mph).

Armament consisted of three 4 in (102 mm) Mk IV QF guns on the ship's centreline, with one on the forecastle, one aft on a raised platform and one between the second and third funnels. A single 2-pounder (40 mm) pom-pom anti-aircraft gun was carried, while torpedo armament consisted of two rotating twin mounts for 21 in (533 mm) torpedoes. The ship had a complement of 82 officers and ratings.

== Construction and career ==
Romola was laid down by John Brown & Company at Clydebank on the River Clyde on 25 August 1915 and launched on 14 May 1916, leaving the yard on 17 August that year. The destroyer was allocated the yard number 449. The build took 263 days and fitting out 96 days, the latter the longest of any of the class constructed at the yard. Despite that, Romola was the first of the order to enter service.

On commissioning, Romola joined the 11th Destroyer Flotilla of the Grand Fleet. On 24 April 1918 the Flotilla was called to intercept the High Seas Fleet on what was to prove the last major expedition by the German Navy during the War. The ships did not meet and no shots were fired in anger.

After the War, Romola was sent to Gibraltar along with sister-ship Rowena, arriving on 8 May 1920. Romola, as part of the Gibraltar Local Defence Flotilla, escorted the battlecruiser Renown, carrying Edward, the Prince of Wales, into Gibraltar on 29 October 1921. From 1922, as part of a general demobilisation of the Royal Navy's local defence flotillas, Romola carried a reduced complement. In September 1922, as a result of the Chanak Crisis, which threatened war between Britain and Turkey, Romola's crew was made up to a full complement with men from the cruiser Vindictive and the destroyer, together with sister-ship Rigorous was ordered to Malta. In September 1923, it was announced that Romola and Rigorous would be replaced in the Gibraltar Local Defence Flotilla by the S-class destroyers Splendid and Tourmaline, with the two R-class destroyers going into reserve at Plymouth. In November 1927, Romola relieved Simoom as emergency destroyer at Devonport, and in November 1927 was replaced as Devonport emergency destroyer by Thanet. The destroyer was subsequently recommissioned at Devonport and held in reserve. On 13 March 1930, the vessel was sold to King of Troon and broken up.

== Pennant numbers ==
Pennant number	Date
G83	September 1915
G18	January 1918
G15	March 1918
G53	January 1919
