= 10th Destroyer Flotilla =

- Active: 1914–1919, 1940–1941, 1944–1945
- Country: United Kingdom
- Branch: Royal Navy
- Size: Flotilla
- Engagements: Battle of Jutland, Battle of Calabria, Battle of Cape Matapan, Battle of Ushant

The British 10th Destroyer Flotilla, or Tenth Destroyer Flotilla, was a military formation of the Royal Navy from March from 1914 to 1919. It was reformed on an ad hoc basis from 1940 to 1941 and finally from 1944 to 1945.

== History ==
First created in March 1914 it was later assigned to the Harwich Striking Force later renamed Harwich Force in April 1915. The flotilla took part in the Battle of Jutland, (31 May – 1 June 1916) after Jutland it remained with the Harwich Force until it was disbanded in April 1919. The flotilla was reactivated again during World War Two but each time this was a temporary arrangement. It reformed as part of the Mediterranean Fleet from 1 June 1940 to 1 July 1941 before being de-mobilised. It was reformed for the last time as part of the Plymouth Command in April 1944 it was primarily known for its part in the Battle of Ushant (9 June 1944) it remained active until 1 December 1944 it was abolished in 1945.

== Administration ==
=== Captains (D) afloat, 10th Destroyer Flotilla ===
Captain (D) afloat is a Royal Navy appointment of an operational commander of a destroyer flotilla or squadron.

Post holders included:

- Captain Wilmot S. Nicholson, 11 November 1914 – 1 December 1916
- Captain Colin K. MacLean, 17 October 1917 – 1 March 1919

Flotilla disbanded till 1940 then abolished 1941 until reformed in 1944 until 1945

- Captain Hector Waller, 1940–1941
- Captain Basil Jones, 1944–1945

== Sources ==
- Harley, Simon; Lovell, Tony. (2018) "Tenth Destroyer Flotilla (Royal Navy) - The Dreadnought Project". www.dreadnoughtproject.org. Harley and Lovell.
- Hinsley, F. H.; Thomas, Edward Eastaway; Ransom, C. F. G.; Knight, R. C.; Simkins, C. A. G. (1988). British Intelligence in the Second World War: Volume 3. Cambridge, England: Cambridge University Press. ISBN 978-0-52-135196-6.
- Sutherland, Jonathan; Canwell, Diane (2007). The Battle of Jutland (New ed. ed.). Barnsley: Pen & Sword Maritime. ISBN 978-1-84-415529-3.
- Tent, James Foster (1996). E-boat alert : defending the Normandy invasion fleet. Annapolis, Md.: Naval Inst. Press. ISBN 978-1-55-750805-8.
- Watson, Dr Graham. (2015) "Royal Navy Organization in World War 2, 1939-1945". www.naval-history.net. Gordon Smith.
- Whitby, Michael (2011). Commanding Canadians: The Second World War Diaries of A.F.C. Layard. Vancouver, Canada: UBC Press. ISBN 978-0-77-484037-8.
- Whitby, Michael. (2012) "Matters of the Channel Night: The 10th Destroyer Flotilla's Victory Off Ile De Batz, 9 June 1944". Directorate of Heritage and History, Department of National Defence (Canada).
