= List of ships built by John Brown & Company =

This is a list of ships built by John Brown & Company at their shipyard in Clydebank, Scotland.

== A ==
- HMS Acasta (1912)
- HMS Acasta (H09)
- HMS Achates (1912)
- HMS Achates (H12)
- HMS Acorn (1910)
- MV Adelaide Star (1950)
- HMS Airedale (L07)
- HMS Alarm (1911)
- RMS Alaunia (1925)
- HMS Albrighton (L12)
- MV Algol (1952)
- HMCS Algonquin (R17)
- MV Alisa (1972)
- MV Almak (1951)
- SS Alvega (1955)
- HMS Ambuscade (1913)
- SS Amsterdam (1930)
- SS Amsterdam (1950)
- SS Antrim (1904)
- HMS Antrim (1905)
- SS Antwerp (1919)
- RMS Aquitania
- SS Arcadia (1954)
- SS Argyllshire
- SS Arnhem (1946)
- SS Atalanta (1906)
- HMS Aurora (F10)
- HMAS Australia (D84)
- HMAS Australia (1911)
- SS Avelona (1926)
- SS Avila (1926)
- HMS Avon Vale (L06)

== B ==
- HMS Bacchante (1901)
- HMS Barham (04)
- HMS Barrosa (D68)
- PS Barry (1907)
- HMS Basilisk (H11)
- SS Bata (1919)
- HMS Beagle (1909)
- HMS Beagle (H30)
- HMS Bermuda (52)
- SS Bodnant (1919)
- INS Brahmaputra (1957)
- HMS Brisk (1910)
- HMS Bristol (1911)
- HMY Britannia
- SS British Confidence (1965)
- MV British Diplomat (1926)
- SS British Duchess (1958)
- SS British Hussar (1962)
- SS British Industry (1956)
- SS British Judge (1958)
- SS British Mariner (1963)
- SS British Queen (1959)
- SS British Sailor (1952)
- SS British Soldier (1954)
- SS British Trader (1957)
- SS Bruges (1920)
- HMS Bulldog (1909)

== C ==
- HMS Caesar (R07)
- SS Calgary (1920)
- SS Calumet (1922)
- HMAS Canberra (D33)
- HMS Canterbury (1916)
- MV Cape St Vincent (1966)
- SS Cariboo (1924)
- RMS Carinthia (1956)
- RMS Carmania (1905)
- RMS Caronia (1947)
- HMS Cavendish (R15)
- MV Centaur (1963)
- HMS Ceres (D59)
- SS City of Birmingham (1948)
- SS City of Oxford (1948)
- MV Clan Macindoe (1959)
- MV Clan Macintosh (1951)
- MV Clan Macintyre (1951)
- MV Clan Macnair (1961)
- MV Clydewater (1951)
- SS Cochrane (1922)
- MV Comanchee (1936)
- SS Copenhagen (1907)
- HMCS Crescent (R16)
- HMS Crusader (R20)

== D ==
- SS Derby (1960)
- PS Devonia (1905)
- HMS Diamond (D35)
- SS Doris (1910)
- SS Dorset (1903)
- SS Duchess of Bedford
- SS Duchess of Richmond
- SS Duchess of York (1928)
- SS Duke of Albany (1907)
- SS Duke of Connaught (1902)
- PS Duchess of Montrose (1902)
- HMS Duke of York (17)

== E ==
- SS East River (1954)
- SS Edgewater (1957)
- SS Ekari (1920)
- SS Emperor Nicholas I (1913)
- SS Emperor Peter the Great (1913)
- RMS Empress of Britain (1931)
- HMS Enchantress (L56)
- HMS Energetic (1902)
- HMS Enterprise (D52)
- SS Essex (1902)
- MV Essex (1936)
- MV Essex (1953)
- MV Essex Ferry (1956)

== F ==
- HMS Fernie (L11)
- HMS Fiji (58)
- HMS Forth (A187)
- HMS Fortune (H70)
- HMS Foxhound (1909)
- HMS Foxhound (H69)
- SS Franconia (1923)

== G ==
- HMS Garth (L20)
- MV Glenfinlas (1966)
- PS Golden Eagle (1909)
- PS Gwalia (1905)

== H ==
- HMS Halcyon (J42)
- HMS Hampshire (D06)
- MV Haparangi (1947)
- HMS Hardy (R08)
- SS Haverford (1901)
- HMS Hecla (1940)
- MV Hinakura (1949)
- HMS Hind (1911)
- HMS Hindustan (1905)
- HMS Hood (51)
- HMS Hornet (1912)
- SS Hororata (1941)
- HMS Hydra (1912)

== I ==
- HMS Icarus (D03)
- HMS Ilex (D61)
- SS Imperio (1947)
- HMS Indefatigable (R10)
- HMS Inflexible (1907)
- HMS Intrepid (L11)
- SS Invergordon (1923)
- RMS Ivernia (1954)

== J ==
- HMS Jackal (F22)
- HMS Javelin (F61)
- SS Jeannette (1911)
- PS Jackel (1853 Yard Number 1)

== K ==
- SS Kaikoura (1903)
- SS Kaipara (1903)
- HMS Kempenfelt (R03)
- SS Kent (1960)
- SS Kenuta (1907)
- MV Kipawa (1951)
- MS Kungsholm (1966)

== L ==
- HMS Leviathan (1901)
- SS Lima (1907)
- SS Lincoln (1958)
- HMS Loch Fada (K390)
- MV Lochkatrine (1921)
- MV Lumen (1925)
- RMS Lusitania
- HMS Lynx (F27)

== M ==
The steamship RMS Mauretania (1906) was constructed by Swan Hunter & Wingham Richardson, ship builders, not John Brown & Co.of Clydebank Scotland.

- HMS Maidstone (1937)
- HMS Mameluke (1915)
- HMS Marne (1915)
- PS Mars (1902)
- HMS Matapan (D43)
- HMS Medea (1915)
- RMS Media
- HMS Medusa (1915)
- SS Merion
- HMS Milne (1914)
- SS Mirror (1923)
- HMS Mons (1915)
- SS Montcalm (1920)
- SS Montclare (1921)
- HMS Moorsom (1915)
- HMS Morris (1914)
- SS Munich (1908)

== N ==
- SS Nahlin (1930)
- HMS Nairana (D05)
- HMS Napier (1916)
- HMS Narbrough (1916)
- HMS Nerissa (G65) (renamed ORP Piorun)
- RMS Niagara
- HMAS Nizam (G38)
- MV Norfolk (1946)
- MV Norfolk Ferry (1951)
- SS Norseman (1923)
- MV Northumberland (1955)
- MV Nottingham (1949)

== O ==
- HMS Onslow (G17)
- RMS Orama (1911)
- RMS Ormonde (1917)
- SS Oronsay (1925)
- SS Orsova (1909)
- HMS Ossory (1915)
- MV Otaio (1957)
- MV Otaki (1952)
- MV Ottawa (1950)

== P ==
- HMS Paladin (G69)
- SS Pannonia (1903)
- SS Partridge (1906)
- SS Patria (1947)
- HMS Pegasus (1917)
- HMS Penn (1916)
- HMS Peregrine (1916)
- HMAS Platypus (1917)
- MV Port Wellington (1946)
- MV Port Wyndham (1934)
- SS Prague (1929)
- SS Preussen (1910)
- SS Princess Elaine (1927)
- SS Princess Kathleen (1924)
- SS Princess Marguerite (1924)

== Q ==
- RMS Queen Mary
- RMS Queen Elizabeth
- SS Queen Elizabeth 2

== R ==
- HMS Racehorse (H11)
- HMS Rambler (1908)
- MS Rangitane (1929)
- MV Rangitane (1949)
- MS Rangitata
- MS Rangitiki
- HMS Recruit (1900)
- HMS Redoubt (H41)
- HMS Relentless (H85)
- HMS Repulse (1916)
- HMS Restless (1916)
- SS Restless (1923)
- HMS Rigorous (1916)
- HMS Roberts (F40)
- HMS Romola (1916)
- HMS Rotherham (H09)
- HMS Rowena (1916)
- MS Ruahine

== S ==
- SS St Andrew (1908)
- SS St David (1906)
- SS St Helier (1925)
- SS St Julian (1925)
- SS St Patrick (1906)
- SS St Petersburg (1910)
- MV Salmara (1956)
- MV Salsette (1956)
- San Juan (1937)
- San Luis (1937)
- SS Sapphire (1912)
- RMS Saxonia (1899)
- RMS Saxonia (1954)
- HMS Scimitar (1918)
- HMS Scotsman (1918)
- MV Scottish Ptarmigan (1957)
- HMS Scout (H51)
- HMS Scythe (1918)
- HMS Seabear (1918)
- HMS Seafire (1918)
- HMS Searcher (1918)
- HMS Seawolf (1918)
- SS Shropshire (1911)
- HMS Simoom (1916)
- HMS Simoom (1918)
- SS Singapore (1950)
- HMS Skate (1917)
- HMS Skipjack (J38)
- SS Somerset (1903)
- MV Somerset (1962)
- HMS Southampton (1912)
- HMS Southampton (C83)
- SS Stanvac Australia (1955)
- SS Suffolk (1902)
- MV Suffolk (1939)
- MV Suffolk Ferry (1947)
- SS Sunda (1952)
- MV Sussex (1936)
- MV Sussex (1948)
- RMS Sylvania

== T ==
- HMS Tarpon (1917)
- HMS Telemachus (1917)
- SS Thalassa (1924)
- HMS Tiger (1913)
- HMS Tiger (C20)
- RMS Transvaal Castle
- HMS Troubridge (R00)
- HMS Tumult (R11)

== V ==
- SS Vaderland (1900)
- HMS Vanguard (23)
- HMS Vanoc (H33)
- HMS Vanquisher (D54)
- MV Vennachar (1964)
- HMS Venomous
- HMS Verity (D63)
- HMS Veteran (1919)
- SS Vienna (1929)
- MV Vikfoss (1949)
- MV Vikland (1949)

== W ==
- HMS Wager (R98)
- SS War Hermit (1918)
- SS War Rider (1919)
- SS War Thistle (1917)
- HMS Watchman (D26)
- MV Wellington Star (1952)
- MV Whangaroa (1955)
- MV Wharanui (1956)
- SS Wiltshire (1912)
- RMS Windsor Castle (1922)
- SS Woodcock (1906)
- SS Wonga Wonga (1853)

== Y ==
- HMS Yarmouth (F101)

== Z ==
- SS Zealandia (1910)
- SS Zeeland (1901)
