= Almak =

Almak may refer to:

- Almak, Russia, a rural locality in Kazbekovsky District, Republic of Dagestan, Russia
- Almaki, or Almak, a village in Zanjan Province, Iran
- Almak (BFM), a French civilian training ship for cadets of foreign navies
- MV Almak (1951), a ship built by John Brown & Company
- Gamma Andromedae, or Almak, a star in the constellation Andromeda
- Almak, a Star Trek character
