= HMS Sterling =

Royal Navy S class destroyer

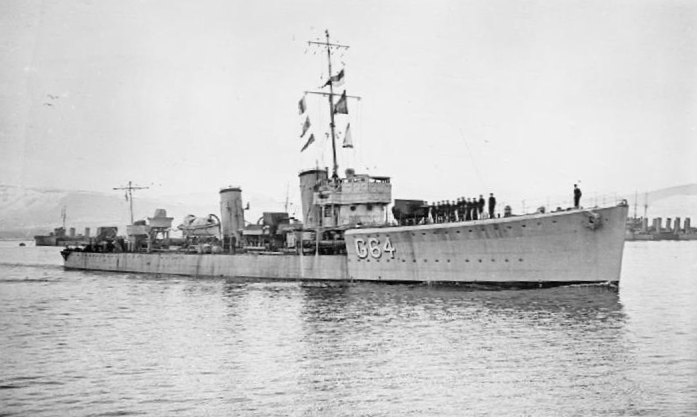
- Sister ship Strenuous

History

United Kingdom
- Name: Sterling
- Ordered: 7 April 1917
- Builder: Palmers, Jarrow
- Laid down: October 1917
- Launched: 8 October 1918
- Commissioned: 28 April 1919
- Out of service: 25 August 1932
- Fate: Sold to be broken up

General characteristics
- Class & type: S-class destroyer
- Displacement: 1,075 long tons (1,092 t) normal; 1,221 long tons (1,241 t) deep load
- Length: 265 ft (80.8 m) p.p.
- Beam: 26 ft 8 in (8.13 m)
- Draught: 9 ft 10 in (3.00 m) mean
- Propulsion: 3 Yarrow boilers; 2 geared Parsons steam turbines, 27,000 shp
- Speed: 36 knots (41.4 mph; 66.7 km/h)
- Range: 2,750 nmi (5,090 km) at 15 kn (28 km/h)
- Complement: 90
- Armament: 3 × single QF 4 in (102 mm) guns; 1 × single 2-pdr 40 mm (2 in) Mk. II AA gun; 2 × twin 21 in (533 mm) torpedo tubes; 4 × depth charge chutes

HMS Sterling was an Admiralty S-class destroyer that served with the Royal Navy at the China Station during the twentieth century. The S class was a development of the R class created during the First World War as a cheaper alternative to the V and W class. Launched in 1918 just before the Armistice, the ship was commissioned in 1919. After a short period based in Harwich, the destroyer was transferred to the China Station. In 1929 and 1931, Sterling was involved in combatting piracy, including helping the crew of the passenger ship Hatching defeat 25 pirates that had secreted themselves amongst the passengers. In 1931, the destroyer was in Kowloon defending Japanese citizens aboard the ocean liner Asama Maru who were under threat from rioters. Soon after, in 1932, Sterling was retired and sold to be broken up in Llanelli.

== Design and development ==
Sterling was one of 33 Admiralty S-class destroyers ordered by the British Admiralty on 7 April 1917 as part of the Eleventh War Construction Programme. The design was a development of the R class introduced at the same time as, and as a cheaper and faster alternative to, the V and W class. Differences with the R class were minor, such as having the searchlight moved aft and being designed to mount an additional pair of torpedo tubes.

The destroyer had a overall length of 276 ft (84 m) and a length of 265 ft (81 m) between perpendiculars. Beam was 26 ft 8 in (8.13 m) and mean draught 9 ft 10 in (3.00 m). Displacement was 1,075 long tons (1,092 t) normal and 1,221 long tons (1,241 t) deep load. Three Yarrow boilers fed steam to two sets of Parsons geared steam turbines rated at 27,000 shaft horsepower (20,000 kW) and driving two shafts, giving a design speed of 36 knots (67 km/h; 41 mph) at normal loading and 32.5 knots (60.2 km/h; 37.4 mph) at deep load. Two funnels were fitted. A full load of 301 long tons (306 t) of fuel oil was carried, which gave a design range of 2,750 nautical miles (5,090 km; 3,160 mi) at 15 knots (28 km/h; 17 mph).

Armament consisted of three QF 4 in (102 mm) Mk IV guns on the ship's centreline. One was mounted raised on the forecastle, one on a platform between the funnels, and one aft. The destroyer mounted a single 2-pounder 40 mm (1.6 in) "pom-pom" anti-aircraft gun for air defence. Four 21 in (533 mm) torpedo tubes were carried in two twin rotating mounts aft. Four depth charge chutes were also fitted aft. Initially, typically ten depth charges were carried. The ship was designed to mount two additional 18 in (457 mm) torpedo tubes either side of the superstructure but this required the forecastle plating to be cut away, causing excess water to come aboard at sea, so they were not carried. The weight saved enabled the heavier Mark V 21-inch torpedo to be carried. Fire control included a training-only director, single Dumaresq and a Vickers range clock. The ship had a complement of 90 officers and ratings.

== Construction and career ==
Laid down in October 1917 during the First World War by Palmers at their dockyard in Jarrow, Sterling was launched on 8 October 1918 shortly before the Armistice that ended the war and completed in March the following year. The vessel was originally to be named Stirling but was launched with the name Sterling, the first to be given the name in the Royal Navy. Sterling was re-commissioned on 28 April 1919. The ship was briefly placed in reserve at Devonport.

On 15 July, the vessel replaced the destroyer Raider at Harwich. The service did not last long and, soon afterwards, Sterling was transferred to the China Station. On 8 December 1929, the destroyer, accompanied by sister ship Sirdar, assisted the crew of the passenger ship Hatching, which had been attacked by 25 pirates that had secreted themselves amongst the passengers. The crew regained control of the ship, but one officer, a guard, five passengers and five pirates were injured. The remaining pirates were tried and executed when the ships returned to port.

On 27 September 1931, the destroyer was docked alongside the wharfs of Kowloon to protect the ocean liner Asama Maru against rioters attacking Japanese goods and businesses, as well as individual Japanese people. After the capture of Hangtang by pirates, on 3 December, Sterling was sent to Nan'ao to retrieve some of the cargo recaptured. The crew also succeeded in capturing some of the pirates. However, the Navy had already decided to scrap many of the older destroyers in preparation for the introduction of newer and larger vessels. Up to nine destroyers, or a flotilla, were proposed. Sterling returned to England in early 1932 and, on 25 August, was retired and sold to be broken up by Rees in Llanelli.

== Pennant numbers ==
Penant numbers
Pennant number	Date
D88	January 1919
FA3	March 1919
F56	December 1920
H31	January 1922
