= HMS Sirdar (1918) =

Royal Navy S class destroyer

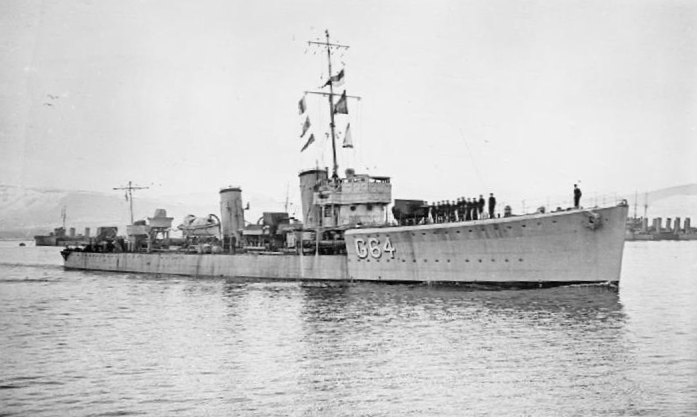
- Sister ship Strenuous

History

United Kingdom
- Name: Sirdar
- Namesake: Sirdar
- Ordered: 7 April 1917
- Builder: Palmers, Jarrow
- Laid down: August 1917
- Launched: 6 July 1918
- Commissioned: 6 September 1918
- Out of service: 4 May 1934
- Fate: Sold to be broken up

General characteristics
- Class & type: S-class destroyer
- Displacement: 1,000 long tons (1,000 t) normal; 1,220 long tons (1,240 t) deep load
- Length: 265 ft (80.8 m) p.p.
- Beam: 26 ft 8 in (8.1 m)
- Draught: 9 ft 10 in (3.0 m) mean
- Propulsion: 3 Yarrow boilers; 2 geared Parsons steam turbines, 27,000 shp
- Speed: 36 knots (41.4 mph; 66.7 km/h)
- Range: 2,750 nmi (5,090 km) at 15 kn (28 km/h)
- Complement: 90
- Armament: 3 × single QF 4 in (102 mm) guns; 1 × single 2-pdr 40 mm (2 in) Mk. II AA gun; 2 × twin 21 in (533 mm) torpedo tubes; 4 × depth charge chutes

HMS Sirdar was an Admiralty S-class destroyer that served with the Royal Navy during the Turkish War of Independence. The S class was a development of the R class created during the First World War as a cheaper alternative to the V and W class. Launched in 1918 just before the Armistice, the ship initially joined the Grand Fleet but was swiftly transferred to reserve when the war ended. After a short period based in Rosyth, the destroyer was transferred to the Mediterranean Fleet at the end of 1919 in time for the Turkish War of Independence. The vessel helped British and Ottoman forces defend the town of Izmit and to escort the Turkish battlecruiser Yavuz Sultan Selim to Tuzla. The destroyer was subsequently deployed to the China Station. Between 1927 and 1931, Sirdar was involved in combatting piracy, including helping the crew of the passenger ship Hatching defeat 25 pirates that had secreted themselves amongst the passengers. In 1930, the destroyer was fired on by members of the Chinese Red Army while cruising along the Yangtze. The signing of the London Naval Treaty that year meant that the Royal Navy needed to decommission older destroyers as new vessels entered service. In 1934, Sirdar was retired and sold to be broken up.

== Design and development ==
Sirdar was one of 33 Admiralty S-class destroyers ordered by the British Admiralty on 7 April 1917 as part of the Eleventh War Construction Programme. The design was a development of the R class introduced at the same time as, and as a cheaper and faster alternative to, the larger V and W class. Differences with the R class were minor, such as having the searchlight moved aft and being designed to mount an additional pair of torpedo tubes.

The destroyer had a overall length of 276 ft (84.1 m) and a length of 265 ft (80.8 m) between perpendiculars. Beam was 26 ft 8 in (8.1 m) and mean draught 9 ft 10 in (3.0 m). Displacement was 1,000 long tons (1,000 t) normal and 1,220 long tons (1,240 t) deep load. Three Yarrow boilers fed steam to two sets of Parsons geared steam turbines rated at 27,000 shaft horsepower (20,000 kW) and driving two shafts, giving a design speed of 36 knots (67 km/h; 41 mph) at normal loading and 32.5 knots (60.2 km/h; 37.4 mph) at deep load. Two funnels were fitted. A full load of 301 long tons (306 t) of fuel oil was carried, which gave a design range of 2,750 nautical miles (5,090 km; 3,160 mi) at 15 knots (28 km/h; 17 mph).

Armament consisted of three QF 4 in (102 mm) Mk IV guns on the ship's centreline. One was mounted raised on the forecastle, one on a platform between the funnels, and one aft. The ship also mounted a single 2-pounder 40 mm (1.6 in) "pom-pom" anti-aircraft gun for air defence. Four 21 in (533 mm) torpedo tubes were carried in two twin rotating mounts aft. Four depth charge chutes were also fitted aft. Typically, ten depth charges were carried. The ship was designed to mount two additional 18 in (457 mm) torpedo tubes either side of the superstructure but this required the forecastle plating to be cut away, causing excess water to come aboard at sea, so they were removed. The weight saved enabled the heavier Mark V 21-inch torpedo to be carried. Fire control included a training-only director, single Dumaresq and a Vickers range clock. The ship had a complement of 90 officers and ratings.

== Construction and career ==
Laid down in August 1917 during the First World War by Palmers at their dockyard in Jarrow, Sirdar was launched on 6 July 1918 and completed on 6 September shortly before the Armistice that ended the war. The vessel was the first to be named Sirdar in the Royal Navy, recalling the noble title of the Commander-in-Chief of the Egyptian Army under British rule. The ship joined the Twelfth Destroyer Flotilla of the Grand Fleet. However, the war had put a huge financial burden on the Royal Navy and it need to return to a peacetime level of strength. Both the number of ships and personnel needed to be reduced to save money. Sirdar was placed in reserve at Rosyth, remaining there into the following year.

Despite the fighting ending of the Western Front, there was still conflict in the Aegean Sea as the Ottoman Empire split up. The Royal Navy deployed an increasing number of destroyers to the Mediterranean and, in November 1919, Sirdar was ordered to be commissioned into the reserve of the Sixth Destroyer Flotilla as part of the Mediterranean Fleet based at Malta. When the city of Izmit was being attacked by the Kuva-yi Milliye on 14 June 1920 during the Turkish War of Independence, the destroyer was deployed to support the British and Ottoman troops defending the town. The vessel then escorted the Turkish battlecruiser Yavuz Sultan Selim to Tuzla. The destroyer returned to Malta. Resuming deployment on 9 February the following year, the vessel arrived at Smyrna as part of an escort flotilla to the dreadnought Ajax three days later. The fleet undertook exercises in the Sea of Marmara on 17 February. On 14 November 1922, the destroyer sailed for Moudros.

Sirdar was subsequently transferred to the China Station, being deployed to Zhenjiang on 27 April 1927 following the Nanking incident. On 21 August, the destroyer was attacked off Zhenjiang by militants. The ship returned fire, killing six without loss of life amongst the crew. On 1 September, Sirdar was deployed on one of many anti-piracy patrols off Daya Bay in the South China Sea. On 8 December 1929, the destroyer, accompanied by sister ship Sterling, assisted the crew of the passenger ship Hatching, which had been attacked by 25 pirates that had secreted themselves amongst the passengers. The crew regained control of the ship, but one officer, a guard, five passengers and five pirates were injured. The remaining pirates were tried and executed when the ships returned to port. On 6 September 1930, the destroyer was fired on by soldiers of the Chinese Red Army while cruising along the Yangtze to Jingzhou. After the recapture of the merchant ship Hangtang from pirates, on 3 December 1931, Sirdar was sent to Nan'ao to retrieve some of the cargo retrieved. The crew also succeeded in capturing some of the pirates. However, the vessel's service days were numbered. On 22 April 1930, the London Naval Treaty had been signed, which limited total destroyer tonnage in the Royal Navy. The force was looking to introduce more modern destroyers and so needed to retire some of the older vessels. Sirdar was decommissioned and, on 4 May 1934, sold to be broken up by Cashmore in Newport, Wales.

== Pennant numbers ==
Penant numbers
Pennant number	Date
G27	November 1918
F51	January 1919
H1A	November 1919
D59	January 1922
