= HMS Seabear (1918) =

Royal Navy S class destroyer

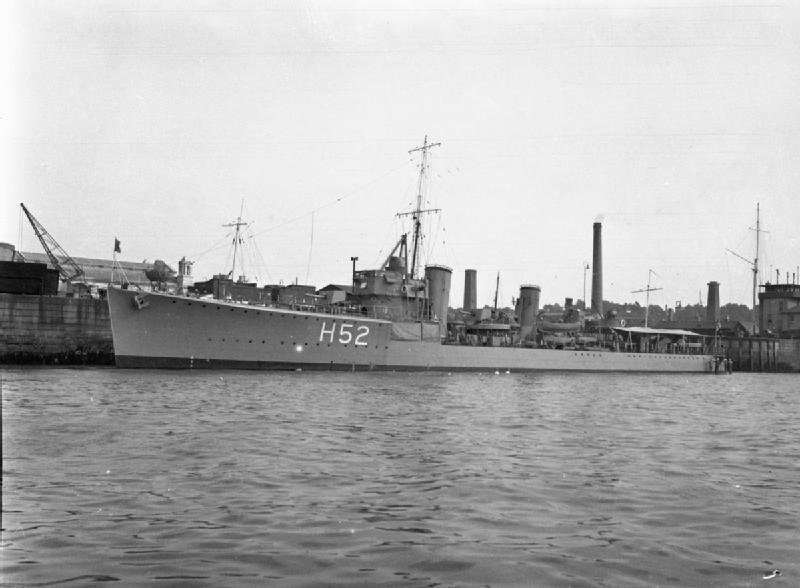
- Sister ship Scotsman

History

United Kingdom
- Name: Seabear
- Ordered: June 1917
- Builder: John Brown & Company, Clydebank
- Yard number: 477
- Laid down: 13 December 1917
- Launched: 6 July 1918
- Completed: 7 September 1918
- Out of service: 5 February 1931
- Fate: Sold to be broken up

General characteristics
- Class & type: S-class destroyer
- Displacement: 1,075 long tons (1,092 t) normal; 1,221 long tons (1,241 t) deep load
- Length: 265 ft (80.8 m) p.p.
- Beam: 26 ft 8 in (8.13 m)
- Draught: 9 ft 10 in (3.00 m) mean
- Propulsion: 3 Yarrow boilers; 2 geared Brown-Curtis steam turbines, 27,000 shp
- Speed: 36 knots (41.4 mph; 66.7 km/h)
- Range: 2,750 nmi (5,090 km) at 15 kn (28 km/h)
- Complement: 90
- Armament: 3 × single QF 4 in (102 mm) Mark IV guns; 1 × single 2-pdr 40 mm (2 in) Mk. II AA gun; 2 × twin 21 in (533 mm) torpedo tubes; 4 × depth charge chutes

HMS Seabear was an S-class destroyer that served with the Royal Navy during the Russian Civil War. The S class was a development of the previous R class, with minor differences, constructed at the end of the First World War. Seabear was launched in December 1917 and joined the Grand Fleet for the last few months of the War. The destroyer then joined the British campaign in the Baltic, sailing as part of a detachment of ten destroyers under the command of Admiral Walter Cowan in March 1919. Seabear sailed to Tallinn in support of the Estonian War of Independence the following month. On returning to the UK, the ship was placed in reserve. The London Naval Treaty limited to number of destroyers that the Royal Navy could operate and, as new ships entered service, older vessels were retired. Seabear was sold in February 1931 and broken up.

== Design and development ==
Seabear was one of 33 Admiralty S class destroyers ordered by the British Admiralty in June 1917 as part of the Twelfth War Construction Programme. The design was a development of the R class introduced as a cheaper and faster alternative to the V and W class. Differences with the R class were minor, such as having the searchlight moved further aft.

Seabear had an overall length of 276 ft (84 m) and a length of 265 ft (81 m) between perpendiculars. Beam was 26 ft 8 in (8.13 m) and draught 9 ft 10 in (3.00 m). Displacement was 1,075 long tons (1,092 t) normal and 1,221 long tons (1,241 t) deep load. Three Yarrow boilers fed steam to two sets of Brown-Curtis geared steam turbines rated at 27,000 shaft horsepower (20,000 kW) and driving two shafts, giving a design speed of 36 knots (67 km/h; 41 mph) at normal loading and 32.5 knots (60.2 km/h; 37.4 mph) at deep load. Two funnels were fitted. A full load of 301 long tons (306 t) of fuel oil was carried, which gave a design range of 2,750 nautical miles (5,090 km; 3,160 mi) at 15 knots (28 km/h; 17 mph).

Armament consisted of three QF 4 in (102 mm) Mk IV guns on the ship's centreline. One was mounted raised on the forecastle, one on a platform between the funnels and one aft. The ship also mounted a single 2-pounder 40 mm (1.6 in) "pom-pom" anti-aircraft gun for air defence. Four 21 in (533 mm) torpedo tubes were carried in two twin rotating mounts aft. Four depth charge chutes were also fitted aft. Typically ten depth charges were carried. The ship was designed to mount two additional 18 in (457 mm) torpedo tubes either side of the superstructure but this required the forecastle plating to be cut away, making the vessel very wet, so they were removed. The weight saved enabled the heavier Mark V 21-inch torpedo to be carried. Fire control included a training-only director, single Dumaresq and a Vickers range clock. The ship had a complement of 90 officers and ratings.

== Construction and career ==
Laid down on 13 December 1917 by John Brown & Company in Clydebank with the yard number 477, Seabear was launched on 6 July the following year and completed on 7 September shortly before the Armistice that ended the First World War. The vessel was the first with the name to serve in the Royal Navy, and one of nine of the class to be built by the yard. Seabear joined the Twelfth Destroyer Flotilla of the Grand Fleet.

Although the war had finished, the escalating civil war in Russia continued. The Royal Navy decided to send a small contingent of warships into the Baltic Sea to monitor the situation. The fleet was tasked with not simply helping to help organise the evacuation of German forces from the country but also supporting the Estonian War of Independence. Seabear was sent as part of a detachment of ten destroyers under the command of Admiral Walter Cowan in Caledon. The flotilla left on 25 March 1919, sailing initially to Oslo, Norway, and Copenhagen, Denmark. Remaining there until 26 April, Seabear then departed for Tallinn to support the Estonian armed forces. The vessel did not remain long and had left the theatre within the month.

At the same time, the Royal Navy was returning to a peacetime level of strength and both the number of ships and personnel needed to be reduced to save money. Seabear joined the Seventh Destroyer Flotilla based at Rosyth and was placed in reserve. For a short time during the following year, the destroyer was back in active duty attached to the Fourth Destroyer Flotilla of the Atlantic Fleet. However, by 1921 Seabear was back in reserve, based at Devonport. The vessel made a visit to Pembroke and, then on 17 January 1925, the port of Portsmouth at the same time as new squash courts had been authorised for the naval base.

On 22 April 1930, the London Naval Treaty was signed, which limited total destroyer tonnage that the Royal Navy could operate. As the force was looking to introduce more modern destroyers, some of the older vessels needed to be retired. Having returned to Rosyth the destroyer was dispatched to Sheerness on 21 October. This proved to be one of the last sailings that the destroyer undertook. On 5 February 1931, Seabear was sold to Thos. W. Ward and broken up at Grays.

== Pennant numbers ==
Penant numbers
Pennant number	Date
G29	November 1918
F48	January 1919
H23	January 1922
