= HMS Searcher (1918) =

Royal Navy S class destroyer

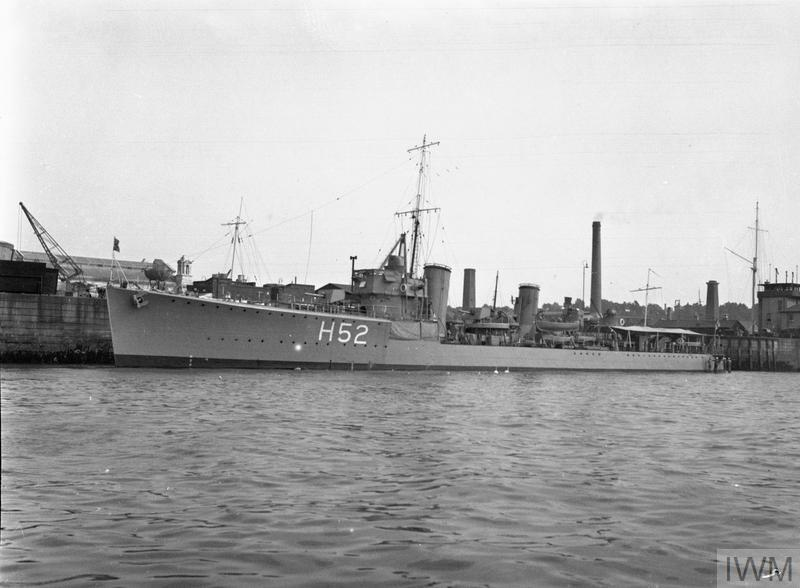
- Sister ship Scotsman

History

United Kingdom
- Name: Searcher
- Ordered: June 1917
- Builder: John Brown & Company, Clydebank
- Yard number: 479
- Laid down: 30 March 1918
- Launched: 11 September 1918
- Completed: 25 November 1918
- Out of service: 25 March 1938
- Fate: Sold to be broken up

General characteristics
- Class & type: S-class destroyer
- Displacement: 1,075 long tons (1,092 t) normal; 1,221 long tons (1,241 t) deep load
- Length: 265 ft (80.8 m) p.p.
- Beam: 26 ft 9 in (8.15 m)
- Draught: 9 ft 10 in (3.00 m) mean
- Propulsion: 3 Yarrow boilers; 2 geared Brown-Curtis steam turbines, 27,000 shp
- Speed: 36 knots (41.4 mph; 66.7 km/h)
- Range: 2,750 nmi (5,090 km) at 15 kn (28 km/h)
- Complement: 90
- Armament: 3 × single QF 4 in (102 mm) guns; 1 × single 2-pdr 40 mm (2 in) Mk. II AA gun; 2 × twin 21 in (533 mm) torpedo tubes; 4 × depth charge chutes

HMS Searcher was an S-class destroyer that served with the Royal Navy during the Russian Civil War. The S class was a development of the previous R class, with minor differences, constructed at the end of the First World War. Searcher was launched in September 1918 and joined the Grand Fleet days after the end of the War. The destroyer then joined the British campaign in the Baltic, sailing as part of a detachment of ten destroyers under the command of Admiral Walter Cowan in March 1919. Searcher sailed to Tallinn in support of the Estonian War of Independence the following month. On returning to the UK, the ship was placed in reserve. In 1931, the destroyer resumed active service and joined the defence flotilla at Gibraltar, and, subsequently, the Mediterranean Fleet, accompanying ships like the aircraft carrier Glorious and the dreadnought Queen Elizabeth on cruises around the Mediterranean Sea. The vessel also took part in the naval review to celebrate the Silver Jubilee of George V in 1935. Searcher was sold to be broken up in 1938.

== Design and development ==
Searcher was one of 33 Admiralty S-class destroyers ordered by the British Admiralty in June 1917 as part of the Twelfth War Construction Programme. The design was a development of the R class introduced as a cheaper and faster alternative to the V and W class. Differences from the R class were minor, such as having the searchlight further aft.

Searcher had an overall length of 276 ft (84 m) and a length of 265 ft (81 m) between perpendiculars. The beam was 26 ft 9 in (8.15 m) and draught 9 ft 10 in (3.00 m). Displacement was 1,075 long tons (1,092 t) normal and 1,221 long tons (1,241 t) deep load. Three Yarrow boilers fed steam to two sets of Brown-Curtis geared steam turbines rated at 27,000 shaft horsepower (20,000 kW) and driving two shafts, giving a design speed of 36 knots (67 km/h; 41 mph) at normal loading and 32.5 knots (60.2 km/h; 37.4 mph) at deep load. Two funnels were fitted. A full load of 301 long tons (306 t) of fuel oil was carried, which gave a design range of 2,750 nautical miles (5,090 km; 3,160 mi) at 15 knots (28 km/h; 17 mph).

Armament consisted of three QF 4 in (102 mm) Mk IV guns on the ship's centreline. One was mounted raised on the forecastle, one on a platform between the funnels, and one aft. The ship also mounted a single 2-pounder 40 mm (1.6 in) "pom-pom" anti-aircraft gun for air defence. Four 21 in (533 mm) torpedo tubes were carried in two twin rotating mounts aft. Four depth charge chutes were also fitted aft. Typically ten depth charges were carried. The ship was designed to mount two additional 18 in (457 mm) torpedo tubes either side of the superstructure but this required the forecastle plating to be cut away, causing excess water to come aboard at sea, so they were removed. The weight saved enabled the heavier Mark V 21-inch torpedo to be carried. Fire control included a training-only director, single Dumaresq and a Vickers range clock. The ship had a complement of 90 officers and ratings.

== Construction and career ==
One of nine of the class to be built by the shipyard, Searcher was laid down on 30 March 1918 by John Brown & Company in Clydebank with the yard number 479, launched on 11 September the following year and completed on 25 November, days after the Armistice that ended the First World War. The second vessel with the name to serve in the Royal Navy, Searcher joined the Fourteenth Destroyer Flotilla of the Grand Fleet.

Although the war had finished, the escalating civil war in Russia continued. The Royal Navy decided to send a small contingent of warships into the Baltic Sea to monitor the situation. The fleet was tasked with not simply helping to organise the evacuation of German forces from the country but also supporting the Estonian War of Independence. Searcher was sent as part of a detachment of ten destroyers under the command of Admiral Walter Cowan in the light cruiser Caledon. The flotilla left on 25 March 1919, sailing initially to Oslo, Norway, and Copenhagen, Denmark. Remaining there until 26 April, Searcher then departed for Tallinn to support the Estonian armed forces. The vessel did not remain long and had left the theatre within the month.

At the same time, the Royal Navy was returning to a peacetime level of strength and both the number of ships and personnel needed to be reduced to save money. Searcher joined the Seventh Destroyer Flotilla based at Rosyth and was placed in reserve. The vessel was subsequently moved to Devonport.

In May 1931, Searcher was taken from reserve to replace fellow S-class destroyer Tourmaline with the local defence flotilla at Gibraltar. Between 5 and 30 April 1933, the destroyer, along with sister ship Shamrock visited Morocco and Spain, calling in at Casablanca, Cádiz, Bonanza, Seville and Tangier. Soon after, on 19 May, the destroyer was ordered to support the aircraft carrier Glorious, the first time that a member of the Gibraltar flotilla had been used for such a purpose. Searcher accompanied the aircraft carrier on cruises around the Mediterranean Sea, visiting Kotor and Malta, before returning to Gibraltar on 16 March the following year. The warship then accompanied the dreadnought Queen Elizabeth on a cruise to Villefranche-sur-Mer during the next month.

On 22 June 1935, Searcher arrived at Portsmouth ready to participate in a fleet review to celebrate the Silver Jubilee of George V. The event involved over 100 ships of the Royal Navy. After a short refit, the destroyer was recommissioned on 12 August and returned to the Mediterranean Fleet. Although based at Malta, the vessel accompanied Queen Elizabeth on visits to various Greek ports, including Crete on 22 October 1936. Soon after, the destroyer returned to the UK and retired. On 25 March 1938, Searcher was sold to Thos. W. Ward to be broken up at Barrow-in-Furness.

== Pennant numbers ==
Penant numbers
Pennant number	Date
G72	November 1918
F43	January 1919
H20	January 1922
