= Léopard-class training ship =

Class of training sea vessels

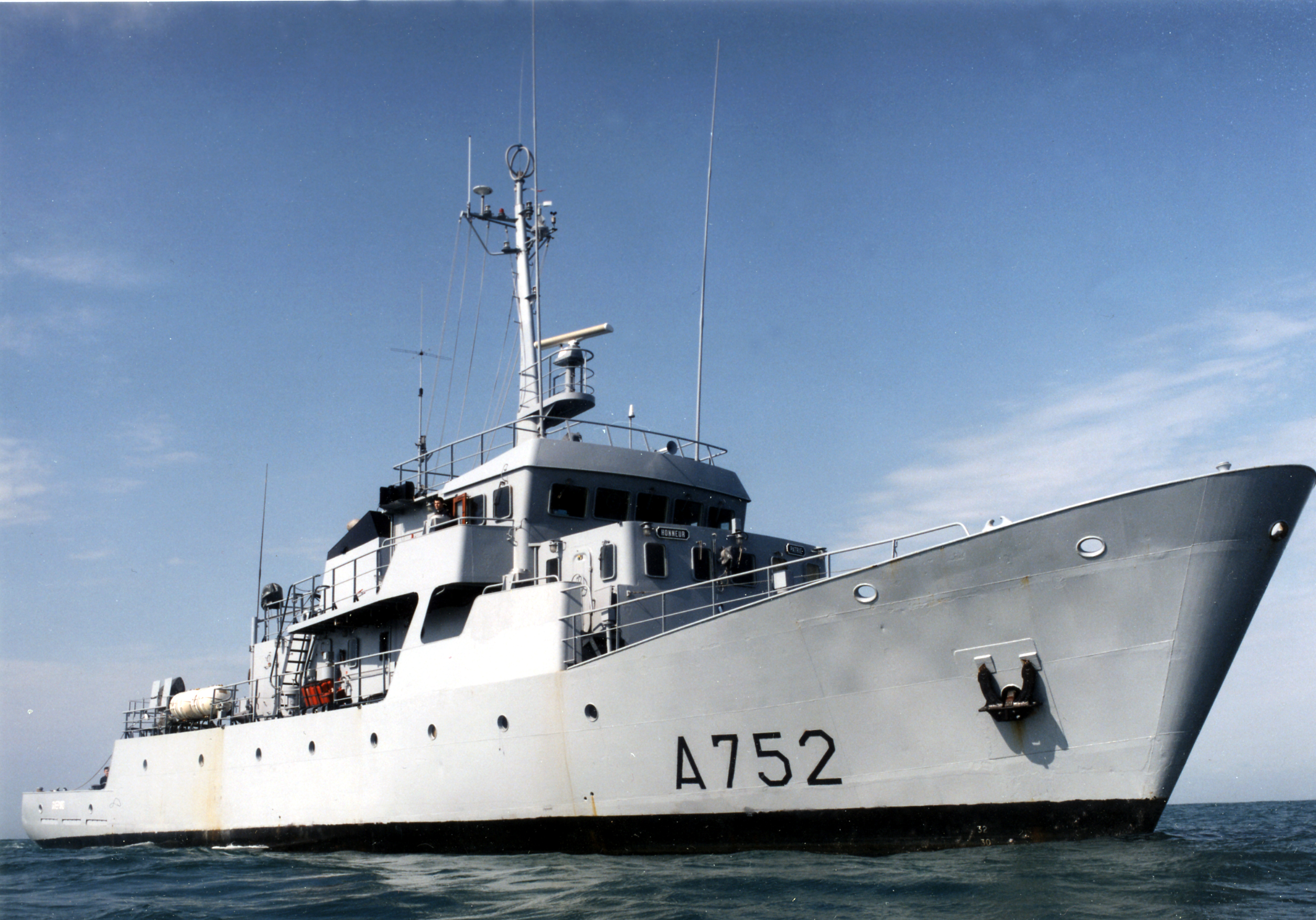
- Guépard at sea

Class overview
- Name: Léopard class
- Builders: La Ferrière, Lorient; ACM, Saint-Malo; SFCN, Villeneuve-la-Garenne
- Operators: French Navy
- Preceded by: Adjutant class
- Succeeded by: Almak
- Built: 1978–1983
- In commission: 1982–present
- Planned: 8
- Completed: 8
- Active: 8

General characteristics
- Type: Training vessel
- Tonnage: 335 t (330 long tons) standard; 470 t (460 long tons) full load
- Length: 43 m (141 ft 1 in)
- Beam: 8.3 m (27 ft 3 in)
- Draught: 3.21 m (10 ft 6 in)
- Installed power: 2 × SACM-Wärtsilä UD30 V16-M3 diesel engines, 1,600 kW (2,200 hp)
- Propulsion: Two shafts with controllable pitch propellers
- Speed: 15 knots (28 km/h; 17 mph)
- Range: 4,100 nmi (7,600 km; 4,700 mi) at 12 knots (22 km/h; 14 mph)
- Complement: 15 + 22 training personnel
- Sensors & processing systems: DRBN 32 radar
- Armament: 2 × single Oerlikon 20 mm cannon; Replaced in 2002 by 2 × 12.7 mm machine guns

The Léopard-class training ships are a class of sea vessels built for the Marine Nationale (French Navy) to train French officer-candidates in basic seamanship. There are eight of these vessels built. They were built by La Perrière in Lorient, Ateliers et Chantiers de la Manche (ACM) in Saint-Malo, and Société Française de Construction Navale (SFCN). These vessels have a secondary role of anti-pollution work and coastal patrol, and are still in active service as of 2022.

== Origin ==
The Léopard-class training ships are used for navigational and practical training of French Navy officer-candidates at sea. In the 1970s, ex-minesweepers were converted into training ships and formed both the 20th and 22nd divisions. In 1978 the French Navy decided to build eight vessels to provide practical training in the operation and navigation of naval vessels. All vessels of the class were named after animals and the class is commonly referred to as "the menagerie".

== Design and description ==
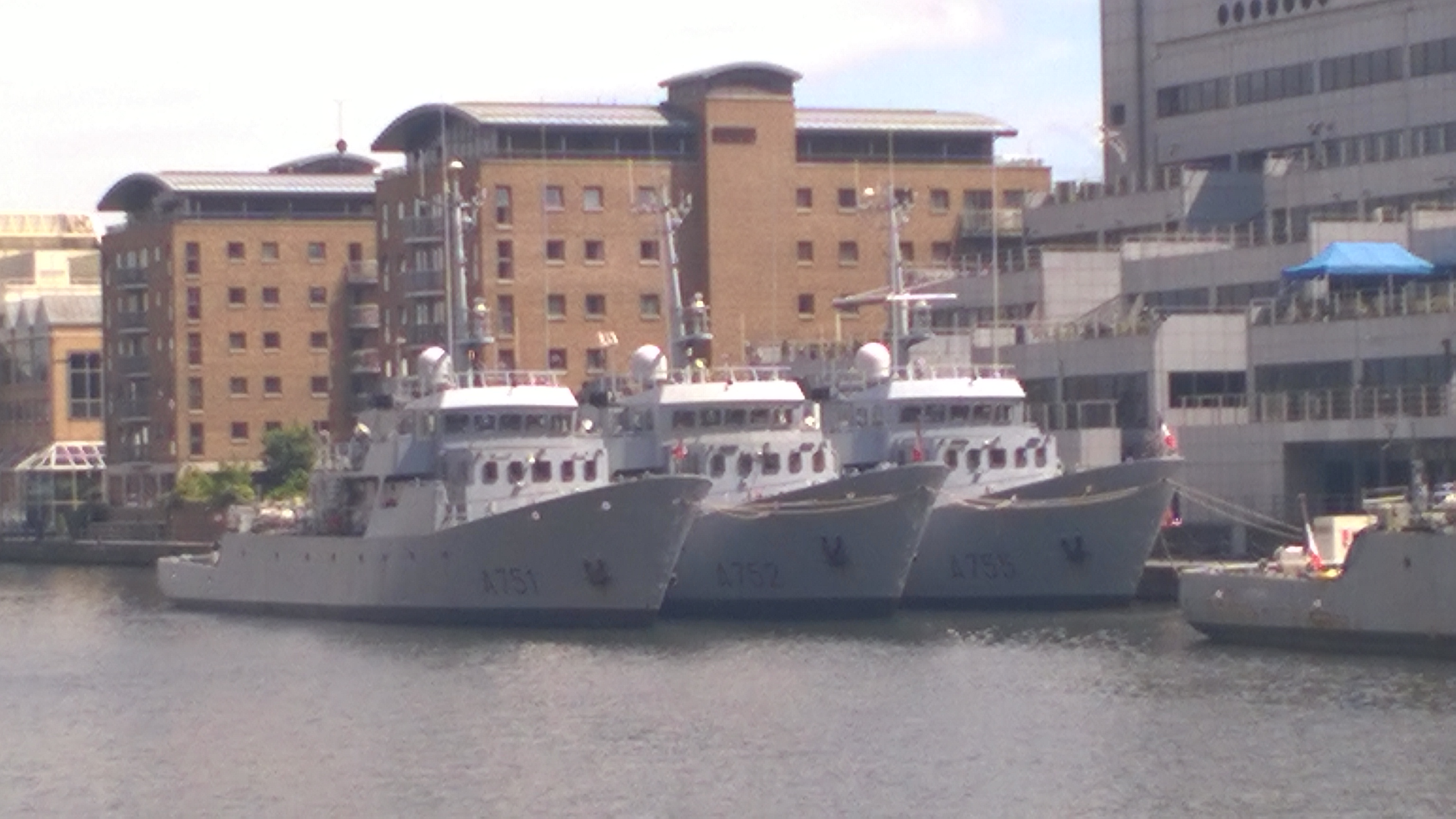
Three Léopard-class ships moored at South Quay in London in 2018

Ships of the Léopard class are 43 metres (141 ft 1 in) long overall and 40.15 m (131 ft 9 in) between perpendiculars with a beam of 8.3 m (27 ft 3 in) and a draught of 3.21 m (10 ft 6 in). The vessels have a standard displacement of 335 tonnes (330 long tons) and a full load displacement of 470 t (460 long tons). Ships of the class originally had twin SACM-Wärtsilä UD30 V16-M3 diesel engines, that were replaced by two 890 kW (1,200 hp) Baudouin 12M-26.2 diesel engines in 2011–2012. Power is transmitted via two shafts turning two controllable pitch propellers creating 1,600 kilowatts (2,200 shp). They have two Baudouin auxiliary diesel electric alternators of 80 kW output each.

The electronic equipment includes DRBN 32 navigational radar. This replaced the DRBN 38A radar in 2011–2012. The vessels initially mounted two single Oerlikon 20-millimetre (0.79 in) anti-aircraft guns but these were removed and replaced with two 12.7 mm (0.50 in) machine guns in 2003. The ships of this class each have a crew composed of 1 officer, 10 sailors, and 4 quartermasters; plus 1 or 2 officers, 2 instructors, and 18 students. Each vessel has two bridges superimposed at the front of the superstructure of which one is used for training.

== Ships in class ==
Léopard class construction data
Number	Ship	Builder	Laid down	Launched	Commissioned	Status
A 748	Léopard	SICNAV, Saint-Malo	6 April 1981	4 June 1981	4 December 1982	In service
A 749	Panthère	SICNAV, Saint-Malo	9 June 1981	3 September 1981	4 December 1982	In service
A 750	Jaguar	SICNAV, Saint-Malo	27 September 1981	29 October 1981	18 December 1982	In service
A 751	Lynx	La Ferrière, Lorient	23 July 1981	22 February 1982	18 December 1982	In service
A 752	Guépard	SICNAV, Saint-Malo	11 October 1982	21 December 1982	1 July 1983	In service
A 753	Chacal	SFCN, Villeneuve-la-Garenne	11 October 1982	11 February 1983	10 September 1983	In service
A 754	Tigre	La Ferrière, Lorient	16 April 1982	8 October 1982	1 July 1983	In service
A 755	Lion	La Ferrière, Lorient	27 February 1982	13 December 1982	10 September 1983	In service

== Construction and operations ==
The first four ships were authorised in 1980 and the remaining four in 1981. All eight ships were stationed at Brest with the first ship entering service in 1982. The class replaced the Adjutant and Ham-class minesweepers for training purposes. All eight ships were initially assigned to the 20th division school, which was formed on 20 January 1983 in Brest, and dissolved on 13 July 1993. Since the division's dissolution, each vessel reports directly to the admiral commanding the École navale (French: Naval Academy). During periods of one to three weeks at sea, students become familiar with the basic functions of chief officer on watch, running lines in navigation groups or solo, life on board, and teamwork. School ship duty is usually at the end of the school year, during June. Additionally the vessels can be used as anti-pollution and as regular patrol ships.
