= HMS Penn (1916) =

British M-Class destroyer, WW1

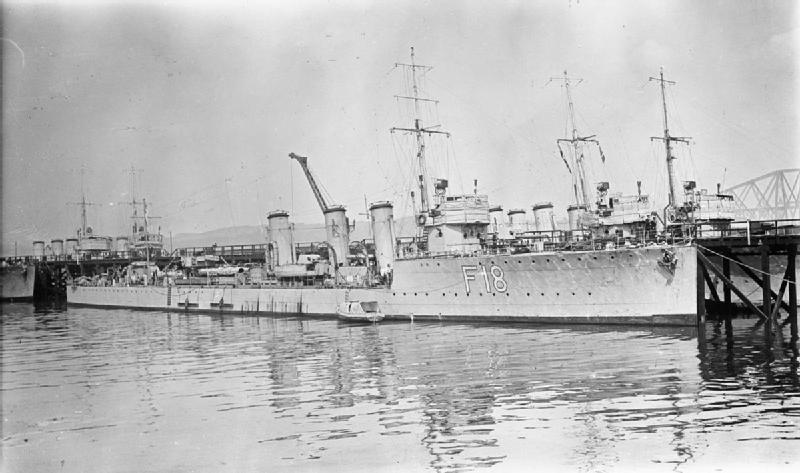
- Sister ship HMS Paladin

History

United Kingdom
- Name: HMS Penn
- Namesake: William Penn
- Ordered: May 1915
- Builder: John Brown & Company, Clydebank
- Yard number: 447
- Laid down: 5 June 1915
- Launched: 8 April 1916
- Completed: 31 May 1916
- Out of service: 31 October 1921
- Fate: Sold to be broken up

General characteristics
- Class & type: Admiralty M-class destroyer
- Displacement: 860 long tons (870 t) (normal); 1,021 long tons (1,037 t) (full load)
- Length: 273 ft 8 in (83.4 m) (o.a.)
- Beam: 26 ft 9 in (8.2 m)
- Draught: 16 ft 3 in (5.0 m)
- Installed power: 3 Yarrow boilers, 25,000 shp (19,000 kW)
- Propulsion: Brown-Curtis steam turbines, 3 shafts
- Speed: 34 knots (63.0 km/h; 39.1 mph)
- Range: 2,280 nmi (4,220 km; 2,620 mi) at 17 kn (31 km/h; 20 mph)
- Complement: 80
- Armament: 3 × single QF 4-inch (102 mm) guns; 1 × single 2-pdr 40 mm (1.6 in) AA gun; 2 × twin 21 in (533 mm) torpedo tubes; Depth charges

HMS Penn was a Repeat Admiralty M-class destroyer which served with the Royal Navy during the First World War. The M class were an improvement on the preceding L class, capable of higher speed. The ship was named after William Penn, the father of the founder of Pennsylvania. Launched on 8 April 1916, the vessel served with the Grand Fleet forming part of the screen for the dreadnought battleships of the 1st Battle Squadron and escorting the aircraft carrier Furious in battle. The destroyer participated in the Actions of 19 August 1916 and 16 October 1917, as well as forming part of the distant support during the Second Battle of Heligoland Bight. Penn was also instrumental in rescuing the survivors from the light cruiser Nottingham, sunk by a German submarine. After the Armistice that ended the war, the destroyer was placed in reserve and subsequently sold to be broken up on 9 May 1921.

== Design and development ==
Penn was one of sixteen Repeat Admiralty M-class destroyers ordered by the British Admiralty in May 1915 as part of the Fifth War Construction Programme. The M-class was an improved version of the earlier L-class destroyers, required to reach a higher speed in order to counter rumoured German fast destroyers. The design was to achieve a speed of 36 knots (67 km/h; 41 mph), although the destroyers did not achieve this in service. It transpired that the German ships did not exist but the greater performance was appreciated by the navy. The Repeat M class differed from prewar vessels in having a raked stem and design improvements based on wartime experience.

The destroyer was 273 feet 8 inches (83.4 m) long overall, with a beam of 26 feet 9 inches (8.2 m) and a draught of 16 feet 3 inches (5.0 m). Displacement was 860 long tons (870 t) normal and 1,021 long tons (1,037 t) full load. Power was provided by three Yarrow boilers feeding Brown-Curtis steam turbines rated at 25,000 shaft horsepower (19,000 kW) and driving three shafts, to give a design speed of 34 knots (63 km/h; 39 mph). Three funnels were fitted. A total of 268 long tons (272 t) of oil could be carried, including 40 long tons (41 t) in peace tanks that were not used in wartime, giving a range of 2,280 nautical miles (4,220 km; 2,620 mi) at 17 knots (31 km/h; 20 mph).

Armament consisted of three single QF 4-inch (102 mm) Mk IV guns on the ship's centreline, with one on the forecastle, one aft on a raised platform and one between the middle and aft funnels. Torpedo armament consisted of two twin mounts aft of the funnels for 21 in (533 mm) torpedoes. A single QF 2-pounder 40 mm (1.6 in) "pom-pom" anti-aircraft gun was mounted between the torpedo tubes. For anti-submarine warfare, Penn was equipped with two chutes, initially each with a single depth charge. The number of depth charges carried increased as the war progressed. The ship had a complement of 80 officers and ratings.

== Construction and career ==
Penn was laid down by John Brown & Company of Clydebank, alongside sister ship Peregrine, on 9 June 1915 with the yard number 447, launched on 8 April the following year and completed on 31 May. The vessel was the first to be named after the naval officer Admiral William Penn, the father of the founder of Pennsylvania. The vessel was deployed as part of the Grand Fleet, joining the Thirteenth Destroyer Flotilla.

The destroyer spent most of the war as part of the screen for the 1st Battle Squadron. A key role was to protect the dreadnought battleships of the squadron from German submarines. As part in the Action of 19 August 1916, the ship was dispatched to support the light cruiser Nottingham, which was sunk by torpedo launched by the submarine U-52. The destroyer sped to the spot to pick up survivors, weaving to avoid the same fate. Despite the cold water, the destroyer managed to save most of the crew. Returned to screen the squadron, Penn subsequently sighted a submarine and helped to fend off attacks by Zeppelin airships against the British warships.

On 18 January 1917, the destroyer, equipped with anti-submarine paravanes, was one of six used for high speed sweeps of Dogger Bank, although no submarines were found during the operation. The vessel remained part of the Thirteenth Destroyer Flotilla based at Rosyth. On 16 October, the destroyer participated in the Action off Lerwick, escorting the aircraft carrier Furious, which launched aircraft to search for enemy ships. Penn rejoined the screen for the 1st Battle Squadron in time for the Second Battle of Heligoland Bight the following month. The squadron did not engage with the German force, which was able to escape through a minefield. The destroyer was subsequently transferred to the Fourteenth Destroyer Flotilla. The flotilla took part in the Royal Navy's response to one of the final sorties of the German High Seas Fleet during the First World War, on 24 April 1918, although the two fleets did not actually meet and the destroyer saw no action.

After the Armistice of 11 November 1918 that ended the war, the Royal Navy returned to a peacetime level of strength and both the number of ships and personnel needed to be reduced to save money. Penn was declared superfluous to operational requirements. On 17 October 1919, the destroyer was reduced and placed in reserve. However, this did not last long. The harsh conditions of wartime operations, particularly the combination of high speed and the poor weather that is typical of the North Sea, exacerbated by the fact that the hull was not galvanised, meant that the Admiralty decided to retire the ship. On 31 October 1921, Penn was sold to be broken up to W. & A.T. Burdon.

== Pennant numbers ==
Pennant number	Date
G50	September 1915
F19	January 1917
F16	January 1918
G74	March 1918
G25	January 1919
