= SS St Petersburg =

North Sea ferry and troop ship

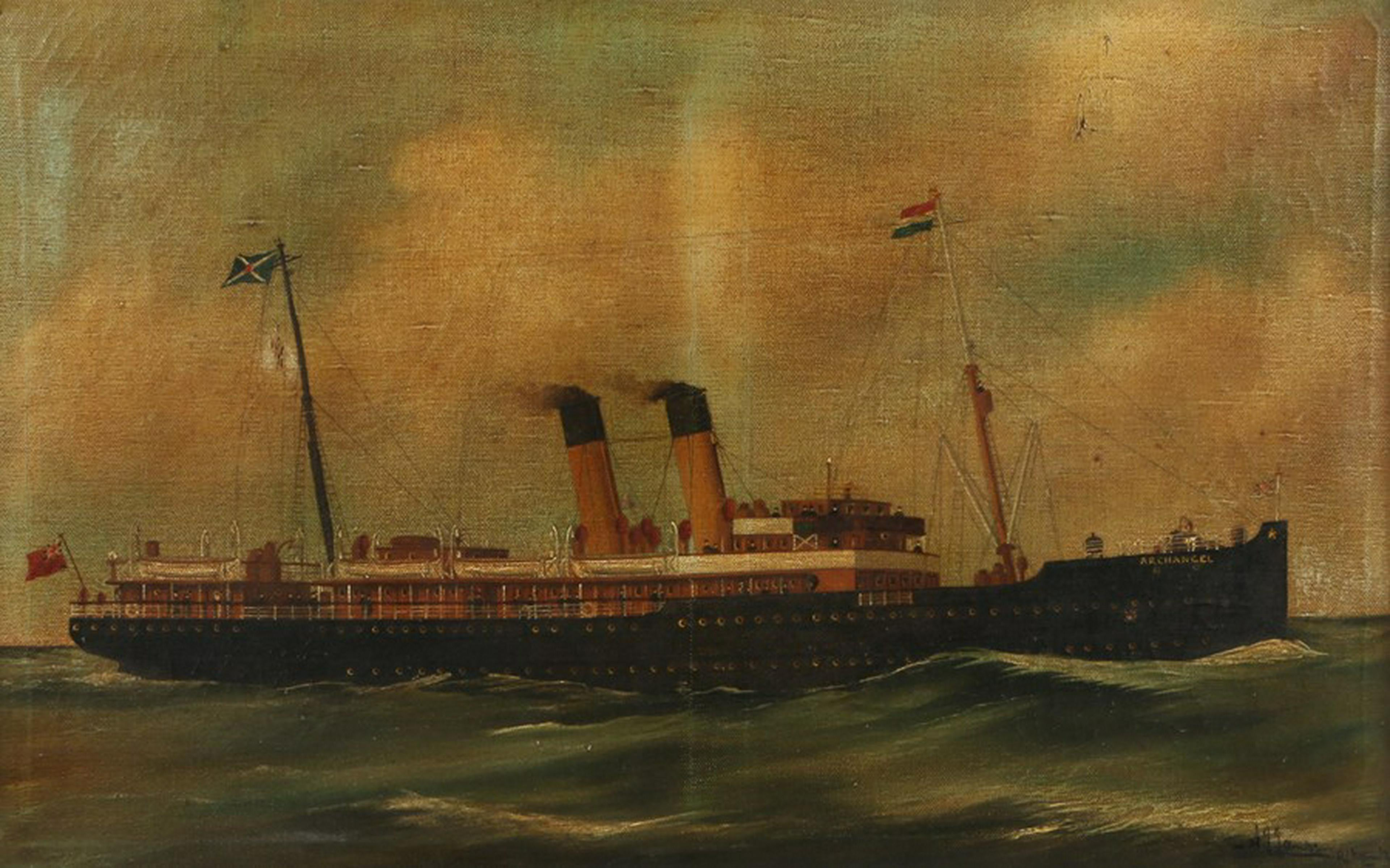
- Archangel in 1925, by Alfred Jansen

History

United Kingdom
- Name: 1910: St Petersburg; 1915: Archangel
- Namesake: 1910: Saint Petersburg; 1915: Arkhangelsk
- Owner: 1910: Great Eastern Railway; 1923: London & North Eastern Rly
- Operator: 1915: (United Kingdom) Admiralty; 1941: (United Kingdom) Admiralty
- Port of registry: 1910: (United Kingdom) Harwich
- Route: Harwich – Hook of Holland
- Builder: John Brown & Co, Clydebank
- Yard number: 397
- Launched: 25 April 1910
- Completed: 1910
- Identification: UK official number 123940; until 1933: code letters HRFS; call sign: by 1913: PQP; from 1914: GPK; by 1930: GRNV
- Fate: Bombed and beached, 1941

General characteristics
- Type: passenger ferry
- Tonnage: 2,448 GRT, 1,039 NRT
- Length: 330.8 ft (100.8 m)
- Beam: 43.2 ft (13.2 m)
- Depth: 18.8 ft (5.7 m)
- Decks: 2
- Propulsion: 3 × steam turbines; 3 × screws
- Sensors & processing systems: submarine signalling
- Notes: sister ships: Copenhagen, Munich

SS St Petersburg was a North Sea passenger ferry that was built in Scotland in 1908 for the Great Eastern Railway (GER). In the 1923 railway grouping she passed to the new London and North Eastern Railway (LNER). She was sunk by enemy action in 1941.

The Admiralty requisitioned her in both world wars as a troop ship. In 1915 she was renamed Archangel.

== Building ==
St Petersburg was the third of three sister ships that John Brown & Company of Clydebank, Dunbartonshire built for the GER. She was preceded by Copenhagen, launched in 1907, and Munich, launched in 1908. Brown built St Petersburg as yard number 397. A Miss Green launched her on 25 April 1910. She was the daughter of Frederick Green, a GER director.

St Petersburg's registered length was 330.8 ft (100.8 m), her beam was 43.2 ft (13.2 m) and her depth was 18.8 ft (5.7 m). Her tonnages were 2,448 GRT and 1,039 NRT. She had three steam turbines and three screws. Each turbine drove its respective screw by direct drive. She was equipped with submarine signalling and wireless telegraphy.

== Career ==
The GER registered St Petersburg at Harwich. Her United Kingdom official number was 123940 and her code letters were HRFS. Her regular route was between Harwich and Hook of Holland.

By 1913 St Petersburg's wireless telegraph call sign was PQP. By 1914 it had been changed to GPK.

In 1915 the Admiralty requisitioned St Petersburg as a cross-Channel troop ship, and renamed her Archangel. After the First World War she was returned to the GER, which in 1923 was absorbed by the new LNER.

On 20 January 1925 she ran aground at the Hook of Holland. Three tugs brought her passengers ashore.

By 1930 Archangel's call sign was GRNV. By 1934 this had superseded her code letters.

== Loss ==
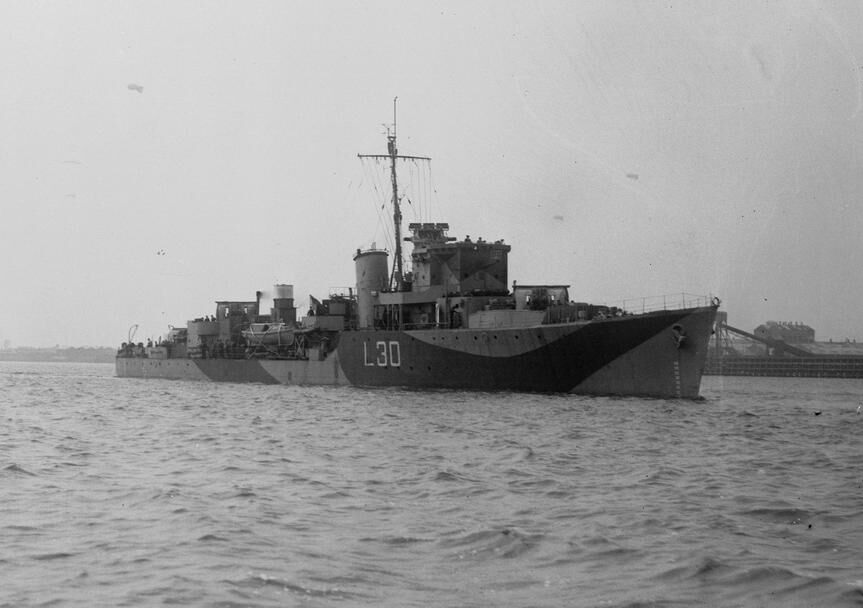
HMS Blankney in 1943

In the Second World War Archangel was again requisitioned as a troop ship. On 16 May 1941 she embarked 182 and 196 batteries of 65th (The Manchester Regiment) Anti-Aircraft Brigade at Kirkwall to take them to Aberdeen. The destroyer HMS Blankney escorted her.

Where Archangel was attacked and beached

Just before midnight that night, three German Heinkel He 111 bomber aircraft attacked the two ships in the North Sea at position 57°55′N 2°03′W. One aircraft, flying at an altitude of 50 feet (15 m), dropped two bombs, one of which hit Archangel in her engine room and boiler room, caused a boiler explosion, and severed communication between the fore and aft of the ship. The same aircraft returned at an altitude of 500 feet (150 m) to strafe Archangel, as the other two He 111s engaged Blankney. Both ships returned fire, and Blankney circled Archangel at speed. The He 111 that attacked Archangel made three runs, and was then damaged and crashed into the sea. The other two aircraft then withdrew.

Blankney launched her boats to rescue survivors, and went alongside Archangel to complete the evacuation. Blankney's surgeon came aboard to assist Archangel's medical officer. Blankney reached Aberdeen about 0800 hrs on 17 May. Casualties included 38 killed and 18 wounded in 182 battery; and three killed and 24 wounded in 196 battery; all suffering from burns. Archangel's Master, Captain AP Sutton, was badly wounded. Accounts differ as to the number of casualties in his crew.

Also on 17 May, either Blankney or a tug (accounts differ) took Archangel in tow. The troop ship beached at Blackdog, just north of Aberdeen, and broke into four pieces.

== Bibliography ==
- Duckworth, Christian Leslie Dyce; Langmuir, Graham Easton (1968). Railway and other Steamers. Prescot: T. Stephenson and Sons.
- Haws, Duncan (1993). Britain's Railway Steamers – Eastern and North Western Companies + Zeeland and Stena. Merchant Fleets in Profile. Vol. 25. Hereford: TCL Publications. ISBN 0-946378-22-3.
- Lloyd's Register of British & Foreign Shipping. Vol. I.–Steamers. London: Lloyd's Register of Shipping. 1911 – via Internet Archive.
- Lloyd's Register of Shipping (PDF). Vol. II.–Steamers and Motorships of 300 tons gross and over. London: Lloyd's Register of Shipping. 1934 – via Southampton City Council.
- The Marconi Press Agency Ltd (1913). The Year Book of Wireless Telegraphy and Telephony. London: The St Katherine Press.
- The Marconi Press Agency Ltd (1914). The Year Book of Wireless Telegraphy and Telephony. London: The Marconi Press Agency Ltd.
- Mercantile Navy List. London. 1911 – via Crew List Index Project.
- Mercantile Navy List. London. 1930 – via Crew List Index Project.

Media related to Archangel (ship, 1910) at Wikimedia Commons
