= HMS Peregrine (1916) =

British M-Class destroyer, WW1

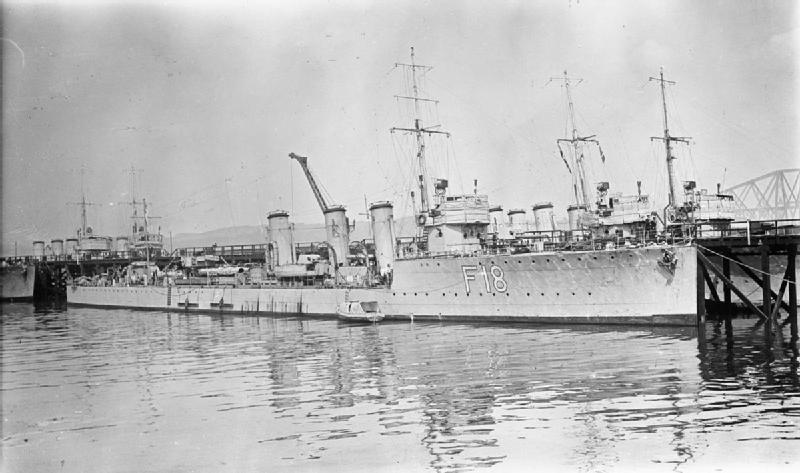
- Sister ship HMS Paladin

History

United Kingdom
- Name: HMS Peregrine
- Namesake: Peregrine falcon
- Ordered: May 1915
- Builder: John Brown & Company, Clydebank
- Yard number: 448
- Laid down: 9 June 1915
- Launched: 29 May 1916
- Completed: 10 July 1916
- Out of service: 5 November 1921
- Fate: Sold to be broken up

General characteristics
- Class & type: Admiralty M-class destroyer
- Displacement: 860 long tons (870 t) normal; 1,021 long tons (1,037 t) full load
- Length: 273 ft 8 in (83.4 m)
- Beam: 26 ft 9 in (8.2 m)
- Draught: 16 ft 3 in (4.95 m)
- Propulsion: 3 Yarrow boilers; 2 Brown-Curtis steam turbines, 25,000 shp (19,000 kW)
- Speed: 34 knots (63.0 km/h; 39.1 mph)
- Range: 3,450 nmi (6,390 km; 3,970 mi) at 15 kn (28 km/h; 17 mph)
- Complement: 76
- Armament: 3 × QF 4 in (102 mm) Mark IV guns (3×1); 1 × single 2-pounder (40 mm) "pom-pom" Mk. II anti-aircraft gun (1×1); 4 × 21 in (533 mm) torpedo tubes (2×2)

HMS Peregrine was a Admiralty M-class destroyer that served with the Royal Navy during the First World War. The M class were an improvement on the preceding L class, capable of higher speed. Launched on 29 May 1916, the vessel served with the Grand Fleet, focusing on anti-submarine warfare. In 1917, the destroyer was involved in the search for UC-65 after the submarine had sunk the protected cruiser Ariadne. In 1918, the ship participated in one of the final sorties of the war, although this did not lead to a confrontation with the German High Seas Fleet. After the Armistice that ended the war, the destroyer was placed in reserve and subsequently sold to be broken up on 9 May 1921.

== Design and development ==
Peregrine was one of sixteen Admiralty M-class destroyers ordered by the British Admiralty in May 1915 as part of the Fifth War Construction Programme. The M-class was an improved version of the earlier L-class destroyer destroyers, designed to reach a higher speed in order to counter rumoured German fast destroyers, although it transpired these vessels did not exist. The destroyers did not achieve the speed required. Nonetheless, the additional speed that was possible was appreciated by the navy.

The destroyer was 273 feet 8 inches (83.41 m) long overall, with a beam of 26 feet 9 inches (8.15 m) and a draught of 16 feet 3 inches (4.95 m). Displacement was 860 long tons (870 t) normal and 1,021 long tons (1,037 t) full load. Power was provided by three Yarrow boilers feeding two Brown-Curtis steam turbines rated at 25,000 shaft horsepower (19,000 kW) and driving two shafts, to give a design speed of 34 knots (63 km/h; 39 mph). Three funnels were fitted and 296 long tons (301 t) of oil carried, giving a design range of 2,530 nautical miles (4,690 km; 2,910 mi) at 15 knots (28 km/h; 17 mph).

Armament consisted of three 4-inch (102 mm) Mk IV QF guns on the ship's centreline, with one on the forecastle, one aft on a raised platform and one between the middle and aft funnels. Torpedo armament consisted of two twin torpedo tubes for 21 in (533 mm) torpedoes located aft of the funnels. Two single 1-pounder 37 mm (1.5 in) "pom-pom" anti-aircraft guns were carried. The anti-aircraft guns were later replaced by 2-pdr 40 mm (1.6 in) "pom-pom" guns and the destroyer was also fitted with racks and storage for depth charges. The ship had a complement of 76 officers and ratings.

== Construction and career ==
Peregrine was laid down by John Brown & Company of Clydebank, alongside sister ship Penn on 9 June 1915, with the yard number 448, launched on 29 May the following year and completed on 10 June. The ship was named after the Peregrine falcon, a title that dates from 1650. The vessel was deployed as part of the Grand Fleet, joining the newly formed Fourteenth Destroyer Flotilla. On 4 July, the new flotilla was sent from Scapa Flow to the Humber. On 22 November, the flotilla took part in exercises north of the Shetland Islands under the dreadnought Iron Duke that also involved the majority of the First and Third Battle Squadrons.

Peregrine spent most of the First World War in anti-submarine escorting and patrols. For example, on 15 June 1917, the vessel, along with the rest of the flotilla, was involved in a large sweep of the area west of the Shetland Islands. The destroyer did not succeed in spotting or sinking any submarines. On 26 July, the destroyer was escorting the protected cruiser Ariadne from Immingham to Plymouth, to lay a deep minefield. Off the coast of Folkestone, the German U-boat UC-65, captained by Korvettenkapitän Otto Steinbrinck, sighted the vessels and launched two torpedoes. The torpedoes hit, sinking Ariadne, while Peregrine unsuccessfully searched for the submarine.

On 15 October, the flotilla formed part of a large-scale operation, involving 30 cruisers and 54 destroyers deployed in eight groups across the North Sea in an attempt to stop a suspected sortie by German naval forces. Despite these measures, the German light cruisers Bremse and Brummer managed to attack the regular convoy between Norway and Britain two days later, sinking two destroyers, Mary Rose and Strongbow, and nine merchant ships before returning safely to Germany. On 24 April the following year, the flotilla took part in the Royal Navy's response to one of the final sorties of the German High Seas Fleet during the First World War, although the two fleets did not actually meet and the destroyer saw no action.

After the armistice, the Royal Navy returned to a peacetime level of mobilisation and Peregrine was declared superfluous to operational requirements. On 29 November 1919, the destroyer was reduced and placed in reserve. However, this did not last long and, on 5 November 1921, Peregrine was sold to be broken up to Cashmore or Newport, Wales.

== Pennant numbers ==
Pennant number	Date
G60	September 1915
G65	January 1917
H94	September 1918
G38	January 1919
