= Forbes Log =

Instrument to measure speed and distance traveled by ships

The Forbes Log is an instrument for measuring the speed and distance traveled by ships, notably those of the Royal Navy. They were introduced commercially by Elliott Brothers in 1909 and were fitted to all capital ships by 1912, generally to aid the use of the dumaresq as well as battle reporting.

== History ==
Elliott Brothers licensed the concept and began production in 1909. It was a standard fit to all capital ships by 1912. The company also licensed the device to Anschütz in 1911, in exchange for a license of Anschütz's gyrocompass technology. The Anschütz compass proved less accurate and less reliable than models introduced in 1913 by Sperry Gyroscope, and the Anschütz models produced by Elliot were replaced with Sperrys.

Initial tests of the Forbes Log in 1912 demonstrated it was not entirely accurate, which added to a larger set of problems being encountered by the Navy's new gunlaying instruments. These issues were eventually solved, and the Forbes Log remained a standard solution well into World War II, by which time they were found on almost all British and allied ships, including submarines.

One of the remote outputs of the Forbes Log was placed in the gunnery control rooms where they were initially used to set the dumaresq and range clocks by their respective operators; in the post World War I-era, the system was often automated, eliminating the need for an operator to do this.

== Description ==
The measuring system of the Forbes Log consists of an L-shaped tube that projects through the hull with the bottom portion of the L facing forward. The ship's forward motion forces water into the tube where it spins a propeller and then exits through a second pipe facing aft. The propeller is connected to a small generator, whose electrical signal is then sent to the Log itself. This consists of a voltmeter pointer indicating the instantaneous speed, and an odometer-like system recording elapsed distance.

The advantage to the Forbes Log is that the signal can be amplified and sent anywhere in the ship. This made it valuable on large Navy ships where the information was being used by many different parts of the crew. In typical use, the main log would be repeated on the bridge and combat center, with additional speed-only indicators sent to the fire control office and turrets to aid gunlaying.
