= MV Northumberland (1955) =

History
- Name: Northumberland
- Owner: Federal Steam Navigation Company London
- Operator: P&O
- Builder: John Brown & Company
- Yard number: 676
- Launched: 7 May 1955
- Identification: IMO number: 5257684
- Fate: Scrapped in Hong Kong by Leung Yau Shipbreaking Co Ltd 1978

General characteristics
- Type: Reefer
- Tonnage: 10,335 GT, 5,698 NT, 10,606 DWT
- Length: 470 feet (140 m)
- Beam: 64 feet 9 inches (19.74 m)
- Draught: 28 feet 9 inches (8.76 m)
- Installed power: 9,000 brake horsepower (6,700 kW)
- Propulsion: 2 x 10 cylinder (580 x 760 mm) 2SCSA Sulzer oil engines, driving a single shaft
- Speed: 16 knots (30 km/h; 18 mph)

MV Northumberland was a refrigerated cargo liner built in 1955 and scrapped in 1978.

She was built in 1955 for the New Zealand Shipping Company by John Brown & Co. in Clydebank, Scotland. It was later sold to P&O; then later to a Panamanian company under the name of Kavo Astrapi; and finally to Guan Guan Shipping in Singapore as Golden City. It was scrapped in 1978 in Hong Kong.
