= HMS Scotsman (1918) =

Royal Navy S class destroyer

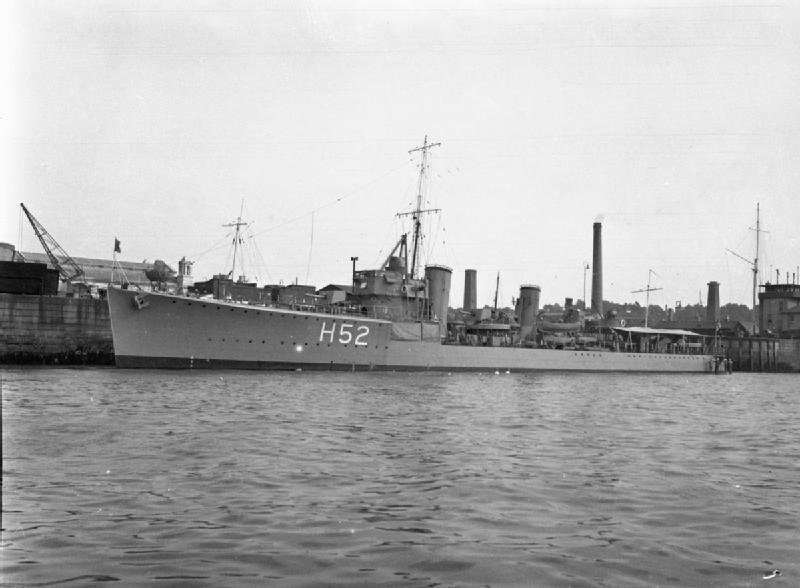
- Scotsman in 1933

History

United Kingdom
- Name: Scotsman
- Ordered: 17 April 1917
- Builder: John Brown & Company, Clydebank
- Yard number: 474
- Laid down: 10 December 1917
- Launched: 30 March 1918
- Completed: 21 May 1918
- Out of service: 13 July 1937
- Fate: Sold to be broken up

General characteristics
- Class & type: S-class destroyer
- Displacement: 1,075 long tons (1,092 t) normal; 1,221 long tons (1,241 t) deep load
- Length: 265 ft (80.77 m) p.p.
- Beam: 26 ft 8 in (8.13 m)
- Draught: 9 ft 10 in (3.00 m) mean
- Propulsion: 3 Yarrow boilers; 2 geared Brown-Curtis steam turbines, 27,000 shp
- Speed: 36 knots (41 mph; 67 km/h)
- Range: 2,750 nmi (5,090 km) at 15 kn (28 km/h)
- Complement: 90
- Armament: 3 × single QF 4 in (102 mm) Mark IV guns; 1 × single 2-pdr 40 mm (2 in) Mk. II AA gun; 2 × twin 21 in (533 mm) torpedo tubes; 4 × depth charge chutes

HMS Scotsman was an S-class destroyer that served with the Royal Navy during the Russian Civil War. The S class was a development of the previous R class, with minor differences, constructed at the end of the First World War. Scotsman was completed in May 1918 and joined the Grand Fleet for the last few months of the War. The destroyer then joined the British campaign in the Baltic, sailing as part of a detachment of ten destroyers under the command of Admiral Walter Cowan in March 1919. Scotsman provided military and humanitarian assistance to the Latvian cities of Liepāja and Ventspils in April 1919. On returning to the UK, the ship was placed in reserve, initially at Rosyth and later Devonport. The destroyer remained in reserve until, in July 1937, Scotsman was sold in part-exchange for the liner Majestic and broken up.

== Design and development ==
Scotsman was one of 33 Admiralty S class destroyers ordered by the British Admiralty on 17 April 1917 as part of the Eleventh War Construction Programme. The design was a development of the R class introduced as a cheaper and faster alternative to the V and W class. Differences with the R class were minor, such as having the searchlight moved aft.

Scotsman had an overall length of 276 ft (84.12 m) and a length of 265 ft (80.77 m) between perpendiculars. Beam was 26 ft 8 in (8.13 m) and draught 9 ft 10 in (3.00 m). Displacement was 1,075 long tons (1,092 t) normal and 1,221 long tons (1,241 t) deep load. Three Yarrow boilers fed steam to two sets of Brown-Curtis geared steam turbines rated at 27,000 shaft horsepower (20,000 kW) and driving two shafts, giving a design speed of 36 knots (67 km/h; 41 mph) at normal loading and 32.5 knots (60 km/h; 37 mph) at deep load. Two funnels were fitted. A full load of 301 long tons (306 t) of fuel oil was carried, which gave a design range of 2,750 nautical miles (5,090 km; 3,160 mi) at 15 knots (28 km/h; 17 mph).

Armament consisted of three QF 4 in (102 mm) Mk IV guns on the ship's centreline. One was mounted raised on the forecastle, one on a platform between the funnels and one aft. The ship also mounted a single 2-pounder 40 mm (1.6 in) "pom-pom" anti-aircraft gun for air defence. Four 21 in (533 mm) torpedo tubes were carried in two twin rotating mounts aft. Four depth charge chutes were also fitted aft. Typically ten depth charges were carried. The ship was designed to mount two additional 18 in (457 mm) torpedo tubes either side of the superstructure but this required the forecastle plating to be cut away, making the vessel very wet, so they were removed. The weight saved enabled the heavier Mark V 21-inch torpedo to be carried. Fire control included a training-only director, single Dumaresq and a Vickers range clock. The ship had a complement of 90 officers and ratings.

== Construction and career ==
Laid down on 10 December 1917 by John Brown & Company in Clydebank with the yard number 474, Scotsman was launched on 30 March the following year and completed on 21 May, shortly before the Armistice that ended the First World War. Construction was a record-breaking 163 days, under six months, from the laying of the keel to the moment the destroyer left the shipyard. The vessel was the first with the name to serve in the Royal Navy, and the third of nine of the class to be built by the yard. The vessel joined the Twelfth Destroyer Flotilla of the Grand Fleet.

Although the war had finished, the escalating civil war in Russia continued. The Royal Navy decided to send a small contingent of warships into the Baltic Sea to monitor the situation. The fleet was therefore tasked with not simply helping to help organise the evacuation of German forces from the country but also support their War of Independence. Scotsman was sent as part of a detachment of ten destroyers under the command of Admiral Walter Cowan in Caledon. The flotilla left on 25 March 1919, sailing initially to Oslo, Norway, and Copenhagen, Denmark, before arriving in Ventspils in Latvia on 3 April. The ship discovered a fraught political situation, with the Red Army approaching and a German Freikorps army under Rüdiger von der Goltz forming the only credible resistance. Meanwhile, citizens starving from lack of food. The sailors provided what assistance they could, including food from their own rations. The destroyer sailed to Liepāja, just before a coup d'état by the Freikorps led to the Latvian government evacuating to a ship in the harbour. The Royal Navy forces provided humanitarian help as well as military support, until 26 April, when Scotsman departed to head back to sea.

At the same time, the Royal Navy was returning to a peacetime level of strength and both the number of ships and personnel needed to be reduced to save money. Scotsman joined the Seventh Destroyer Flotilla based at Rosyth and was placed in reserve. By early 1920, the destroyer had been transferred to Devonport.

On 22 April 1930, the London Naval Treaty was signed, which limited total destroyer tonnage that the Royal Navy could operate. As the force was looking to introduce more modern destroyers, some of the older vessels needed to be retired. Scotsman was initially reprieved and retained as the emergency destroyer based at Devonport. This lasted until 1936, when the ship was replaced in this role by the V-class destroyer Vivien. Scotsman was retired, given to Thos. W. Ward as part-payment in exchange for the liner Majestic on 13 July 1937 and broken up at Briton Ferry.

== Pennant numbers ==
Penant numbers
Pennant number	Date
G30	June 1918
F56	January 1919
H7A	November 1919
H52	January 1922
