= SS Munich =

North Sea ferry and hospital ship

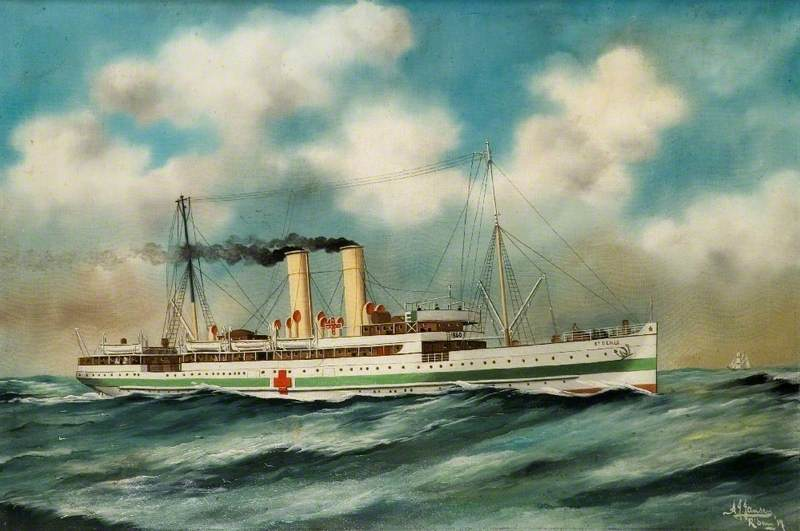
- HMHS St Denis, by Alfred Jensen

History
- Name: 1908: Munich; 1915: St. Denis; 1940: Skorpion; 1940: Barbara
- Namesake: 1908: Munich
- Owner: 1908: Great Eastern Railway; 1923: London & North Eastern Rly
- Operator: 1916: (United Kingdom) Admiralty; 1940: (Nazi Germany) Kriegsmarine; 1945: (Allied-occupied Germany) Allied Forces in Europe
- Port of registry: 1908: (United Kingdom) Harwich
- Route: Harwich – Antwerp
- Builder: John Brown & Co, Clydebank
- Yard number: 384
- Launched: 26 August 1908
- Completed: 1908
- Identification: UK official number 123938; until 1933: code letters HNJM; call sign: by 1913: PQM; from 1914: GPJ; by 1930: GRNT
- Fate: Scrapped 1950

General characteristics
- Type: passenger ferry
- Tonnage: 2,410 GRT, 1,029 NRT
- Length: 331.0 ft (100.9 m)
- Beam: 43.2 ft (13.2 m)
- Depth: 17.8 ft (5.4 m)
- Decks: 2
- Installed power: 1,325 NHP
- Propulsion: 3 × steam turbines; 3 × screws
- Sensors & processing systems: by 1910: submarine signalling
- Notes: sister ships: Copenhagen, St Petersburg

SS Munich was a North Sea passenger ferry that was built in Scotland in 1908 for the Great Eastern Railway (GER). In the 1923 railway grouping she passed to the new London and North Eastern Railway (LNER). She was scrapped in England in 1950.

In 1914 she was requisitioned as a hospital ship and renamed St. Denis. Early in the Second World War St Denis was requisitioned as a troop ship. In 1940 the Kriegsmarine captured her and renamed her Skorpion, and then Barbara. She returned to Allied control in 1945.

== Building ==
Munich was the second of three sister ships that John Brown & Company of Clydebank, Dunbartonshire built for the GER. She was preceded by Copenhagen, launched in 1907, and followed by St Petersburg, launched in 1910. Brown built Munich as yard number 384. A Miss Lawson launched her on 26 August 1908. She was the daughter of Sir Arthur Tredgold Lawson, Baronet, who was a GER director.

Munich's registered length was 331.0 ft (100.9 m), her beam was 43.2 ft (13.2 m) and her depth was 17.8 ft (5.4 m). Her tonnages were 2,410 GRT and 1,029 NRT. She had three steam turbines and three screws. Each turbine drove its respective screw by direct drive. The combined power of her three turbines was rated at 1,325 NHP.

== Career ==
The GER registered Munich at Harwich. Her United Kingdom official number was 123938 and her code letters were HNJM. Her regular route was between Harwich and Antwerp.

By 1910 Munich was equipped with submarine signalling and wireless telegraphy. By 1913 her call sign was PQM. By 1914 this had been changed to GPJ.

In 1914 the Admiralty requisitioned Munich, had her converted into a hospital ship, and renamed her St. Denis. After the First World War she was returned to the GER, which in 1923 was absorbed by the new LNER. In 1932 the LNER relegated her to secondary services.

By 1930 St. Denis' call sign was GRNT. By 1934 this had superseded her code letters.

Early in the Second World War St Denis was requisitioned as a troop ship. The German invasion of the Netherlands in May 1940 caught her in Amsterdam, so she was scuttled. The Kriegsmarine had her raised, renamed her Skorpion, and started to have her converted into a minelayer. The conversion was discontinued, and she was renamed Barbara and used as an accommodation ship.

In 1945 the Allies found Barbara at Kiel, providing accommodation for Kiel University. In 1950 she was towed to Sunderland, where she arrived on 2 March to be scrapped by Thomas Young and Sons.

== Bibliography ==
- Duckworth, Christian Leslie Dyce; Langmuir, Graham Easton (1968). Railway and other Steamers. Prescot: T. Stephenson and Sons.
- Haws, Duncan (1993). Britain's Railway Steamers – Eastern and North Western Companies + Zeeland and Stena. Merchant Fleets in Profile. Vol. 25. Hereford: TCL Publications. ISBN 0-946378-22-3.
- Lloyd's Register of British and Foreign Shipping. Vol. I.–Steamers. London: Lloyd's Register of Shipping. 1908 – via Internet Archive.
- Lloyd's Register of British and Foreign Shipping. Vol. I.–Steamers. London: Lloyd's Register of Shipping. 1910 – via Internet Archive.
- Lloyd's Register of Shipping (PDF). Vol. II.–Steamers and Motorships of 300 tons gross and over. London: Lloyd's Register of Shipping. 1934 – via Southampton City Council.
- The Marconi Press Agency Ltd (1913). The Year Book of Wireless Telegraphy and Telephony. London: The St Katherine Press.
- The Marconi Press Agency Ltd (1914). The Year Book of Wireless Telegraphy and Telephony. London: The Marconi Press Agency Ltd.
- Mercantile Navy List. London. 1909 – via Crew List Index Project.
- Mercantile Navy List. London. 1930 – via Crew List Index Project.
