= SS Copenhagen (1907) =

North Sea ferry and hospital ship

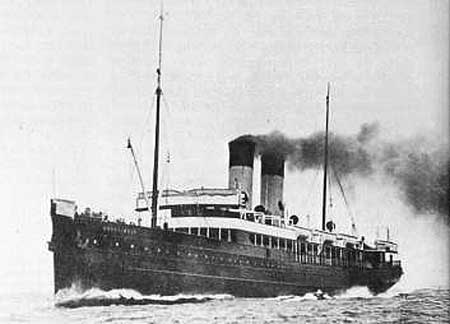
- Copenhagen under way

History

United Kingdom
- Name: Copenhagen
- Namesake: Copenhagen
- Owner: Great Eastern Railway
- Operator: 1916: (United Kingdom) Admiralty
- Port of registry: 1908: (United Kingdom) Harwich
- Route: Harwich – Hook of Holland
- Builder: John Brown & Co, Clydebank
- Yard number: 380
- Launched: 22 October 1907
- Completed: December 1907
- Identification: UK official number 123935; code letters HMFQ; call sign: by 1913: PQC; from 1914: GPI
- Fate: sunk by torpedo, 1917

General characteristics
- Type: passenger ferry
- Tonnage: 2,570 GRT, 1,092 NRT
- Length: 331.2 ft (100.9 m)
- Beam: 43.2 ft (13.2 m)
- Depth: 17.8 ft (5.4 m)
- Decks: 2
- Installed power: 1,200 shp
- Propulsion: 3 × steam turbines; 3 × screws
- Speed: 22 knots (41 km/h)
- Capacity: passengers: 320 × 1st class; 130 × 2nd class
- Sensors & processing systems: submarine signalling
- Notes: sister ships: Munich, St Petersburg

SS Copenhagen was a North Sea passenger ferry that was built in Scotland in 1907. She was the Great Eastern Railway (GER)'s first turbine steamship. In 1916 she was requisitioned as an ambulance ship. A U-boat sank her in 1917 with the loss of six lives.

== Building ==
Between 1907 and 1910 John Brown & Company of Clydebank, Dunbartonshire built three ferries for the GER. Ida Hamilton, daughter of Claud Hamilton, Chairman of the GER, launched yard number 380 on 22 October 1907 as Copenhagen. The ship was completed that December, and registered in 1908. Yard number 384 was launched on 26 August 1908 as Munich. Yard number 397 was launched on 25 April 1910 as St Petersburg.

Each ship had three steam turbines and three screws. Each turbine drove its respective screw by direct drive. Copenhagen was the GER's first turbine ship. The total power of her three turbines was rated at 1,200 shp, and gave her a speed of 22 knots (41 km/h). Her navigation equiplment included submarine signalling.

Copenhagen's registered length was 331.2 ft (100.9 m), her beam was 43.2 ft (13.2 m) and her depth was 17.8 ft (5.4 m). Her tonnages were 2,570 GRT and 1,092 NRT. She had berths for 320 passengers amidships in first class, and 130 in second class aft. Her first class accommodation included 100 double cabins, a 62-seat dining saloon, a ladies' room, and a smoking room.

== Passenger ferry ==
The GER registered Copenhagen at Harwich. Her United Kingdom official number was 123935 and her code letters were HMFQ. Her regular route was between Harwich and Hook of Holland.

By 1910 Copenhagen was equipped with wireless telegraphy. By 1913 her call sign was PQC. By 1914 this had been changed to GPI.

== First World War ==
After the UK entered the First World War, Copenhagen at first remained on her peacetime route, and carried Belgian refugees to Britain. She was then requisitioned, at first as a troop ship. On 1 January 1916 she was reallocated as an ambulance ship.

On 5 March 1917 she was steaming from Harwich to Hook of Holland when SM UC-61 torpedoed her 8 nautical miles (15 km) east of the Noord Hinder Lightship. Copenhagen sank with the loss of six lives.

== Bibliography ==
- Duckworth, Christian Leslie Dyce; Langmuir, Graham Easton (1968). Railway and other Steamers. Prescot: T. Stephenson and Sons.
- Haws, Duncan (1993). Britain's Railway Steamers – Eastern and North Western Companies + Zeeland and Stena. Merchant Fleets in Profile. Vol. 25. Hereford: TCL Publications. ISBN 0-946378-22-3.
- Lloyd's Register of British and Foreign Shipping. Vol. I.–Steamers. London: Lloyd's Register of Shipping. 1908 – via Internet Archive.
- Lloyd's Register of British and Foreign Shipping. Vol. I.–Steamers. London: Lloyd's Register of Shipping. 1910 – via Internet Archive.
- The Marconi Press Agency Ltd (1913). The Year Book of Wireless Telegraphy and Telephony. London: The St Katherine Press.
- The Marconi Press Agency Ltd (1914). The Year Book of Wireless Telegraphy and Telephony. London: The Marconi Press Agency Ltd.
- Mercantile Navy List. London. 1909 – via Crew List Index Project.
