= HMS Paladin (1916) =

British M-Class destroyer, WW1

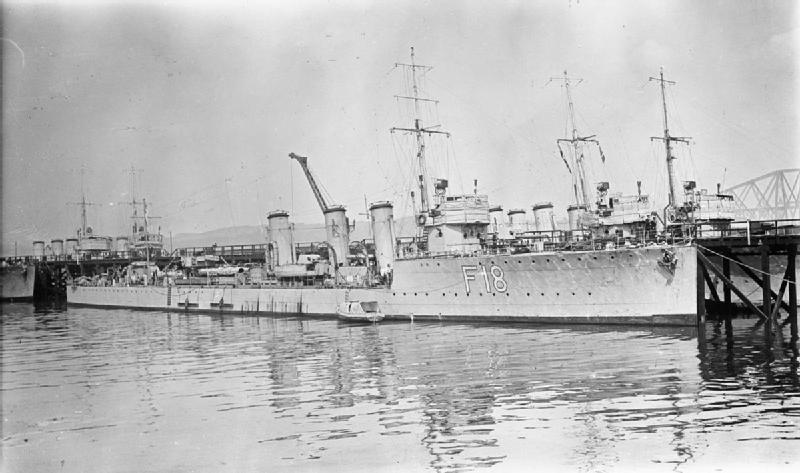
- Paladin in 1916

History

United Kingdom
- Name: Paladin
- Namesake: Paladin
- Ordered: February 1915
- Builder: Scotts, Greenock
- Yard number: 471
- Laid down: May 1915
- Launched: 27 March 1916
- Completed: 1 May 1916
- Fate: Sold to be broken up on 9 May 1921

General characteristics
- Class & type: Admiralty M-class destroyer
- Displacement: 994 long tons (1,010 t) normal; 1,025 long tons (1,041 t) full load
- Length: 265 ft (80.8 m)
- Beam: 26 ft 8 in (8.1 m)
- Draught: 9 ft 3 in (2.82 m)
- Installed power: 3 Yarrow boilers; 25,000 shp (19,000 kW)
- Propulsion: 2 shafts; 2 steam turbines
- Speed: 34 knots (63 km/h; 39 mph)
- Range: 3,450 nmi (6,390 km; 3,970 mi) at 15 kn (28 km/h)
- Complement: 76
- Armament: 3 × single 4 in (102 mm) guns; 1 × single 2 pdr (40 mm) AA gun; 2 × twin 21 in (533 mm) torpedo tubes

HMS Paladin was a Admiralty M-class destroyer which served with the Royal Navy during the First World War. The M class were an improvement on the previous L-class destroyer, capable of higher speed. Launched on 27 March 1916. Paladin took part in the Royal Navy sorties against German minesweepers in 1917, which culminated in the Second Battle of Heligoland Bight on 17 November, although the destroyer did not engage with any enemy warships during the battle. After the end of the war, the ship was placed in reserve before being decommissioned and sold to be broken up on 9 May 1921.

== Design and development ==
Paladin was one of sixteen Admiralty M-class destroyers ordered by the British Admiralty in February 1915 as part of the Fourth War Construction Programme. The M-class was an improved version of the earlier L-class destroyers, designed to reach a higher speed in order to counter rumoured German fast destroyers.

The destroyer was 265 feet (80.8 m) long overall, with a beam of 26 ft 8 in (8.1 m) and a draught of 9 ft 3 in (2.8 m). displacement was 994 long tons (1,010 t) normal and 1,025 long tons (1,041 t) full load. Power was provided by three Yarrow boilers feeding two Brown-Curtis steam turbines rated at 25,000 shaft horsepower (19,000 kW) and driving two shafts, to give a design speed of 34 kn (63 km/h; 39 mph). Three funnels were fitted. 296 long tons (301 t) of oil were carried, giving a design range of 3,450 nautical miles (6,390 km; 3,970 mi) at 15 kn (28 km/h; 17 mph).

Armament consisted of three 4 in (102 mm) Mk IV QF guns on the ship's centreline, with one on the forecastle, one aft on a raised platform and one between the middle and aft funnels. A single 2-pounder (40 mm) pom-pom anti-aircraft gun was carried, while torpedo armament consisted of two twin mounts for 21 in (533 mm) torpedoes. The ship had a complement of 76 officers and ratings.

== Construction and career ==
Paladin was laid down by Scotts Shipbuilding and Engineering Company of Greenock with the yard number 471 in May 1915, launched on 27 March the following year and completed on 1 May. The ship was the first to be named by the Navy after the paladin, the knights of Charlemagne. (Note: A hired rescue tug Paladin was commissioned in 1914, keeping her civilian name, and renamed Paladin II in 1916.) The vessel was deployed as part of the Grand Fleet, joining the Thirteenth Destroyer Flotilla.

During 1917, the Admiralty became concerned about German minesweeper activity off the Heligoland Bight. On 16 October, the destroyer sortied with the leader Valentine, but found no enemy ships. The ship subsequently formed part of the screen for the First Battle Squadron led by the dreadnought Revenge during the Second Battle of Heligoland Bight on 17 November. The British fleet attempted to engage the light cruisers supporting the minesweepers, but were unsuccessful in sinking any of them. The destroyer remained with the destroyer screen for capital ships throughout the war, although by 1918, this was the faster battlecruisers.

After the Armistice of 11 November 1918, the Royal Navy returned to a peacetime level of mobilisation, and surplus vessels were placed in reserve. Paladin was initially transferred to Nore on 14 January 1919 until being decommissioned and sold to Thos. W. Ward in Rainham on 9 May 1921 and broken up.

== Pennant numbers ==
Pennant number	Date
G40	September 1916
F18	January 1917
F14	January 1918
G73	March 1918
D1A	November 1918
G30	January 1919
F11	September 1919
