= Almak (BFM) =

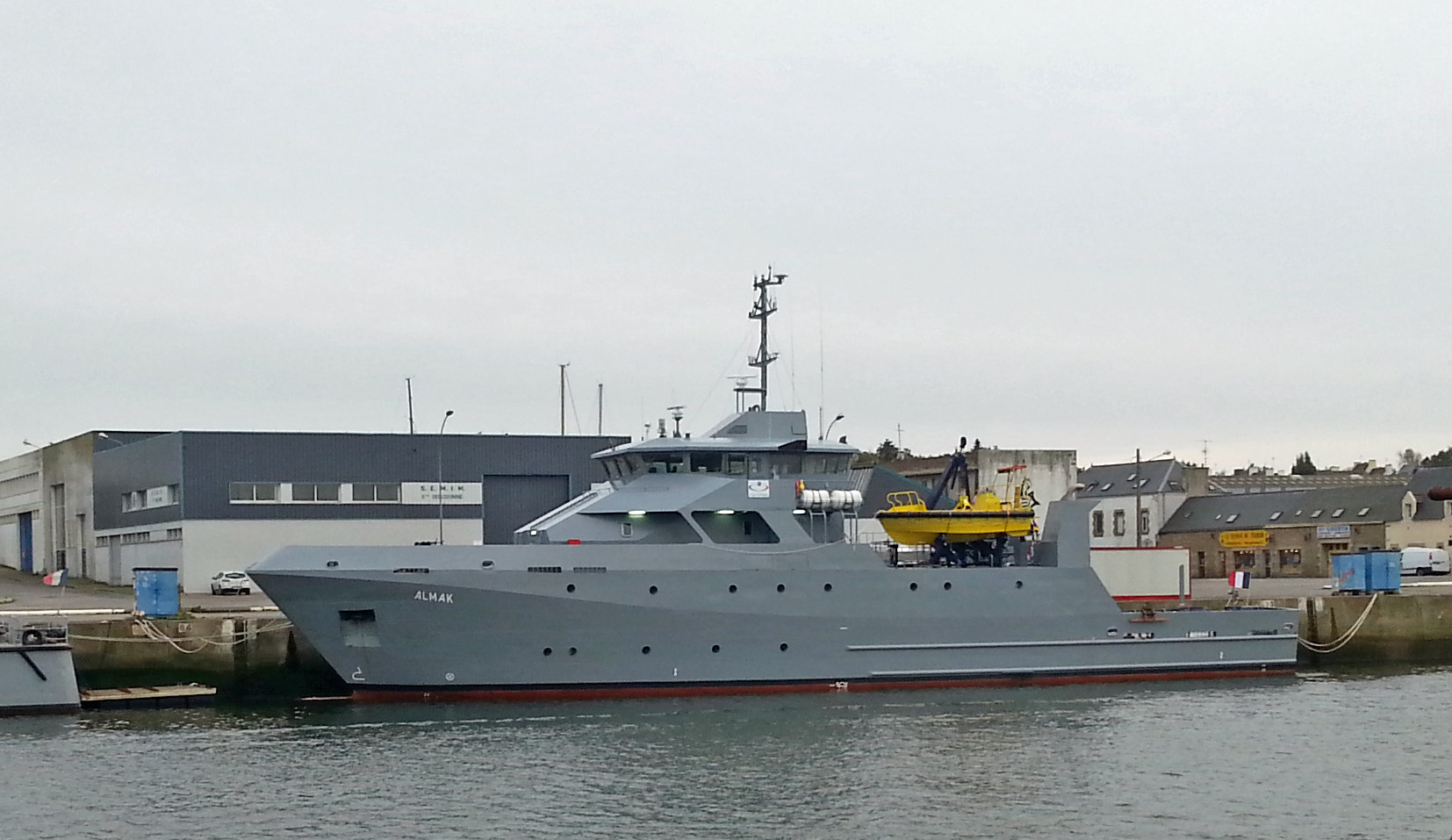
- Almak under construction in Concarneau

History

France
- Name: Almak
- Operator: French Navy
- Builder: Piriou shipyard in Concarneau
- Laid down: September 2012
- Launched: July 11, 2013
- Commissioned: September 27, 2013

General characteristics
- Type: Training Vessel
- Length: 44m
- Beam: 9.60m
- Draft: 3.10m
- Propulsion: 2 x Beaudoin 662 kilowatts with two shafts and variable pitch propellers, bow thruster
- Speed: 12 knots
- Range: 3,600 nautical miles at 10 knots
- Endurance: 10 days
- Crew: 8 crew and 16 trainee sailors
- Sensors & processing systems: 2 radars, GPS, GMTSS

Almak is a French civilian training ship for cadets of foreign navies. It is owned by Defense Council International (DCI). It is intended for use with students following foreign officers trained by DCI Navfco. It allows DCI to respond to the increasing number of foreign students trained in France. The ship's name refers to a star in the constellation of Andromeda.

== Design ==
Almak adopts the design of P43, a concept developed by patrol Piriou sites. It is an international consulting Defense Command (INN) that serves as the collaborative organization of the French armed with friendly nations. Built in Concarneau by Piriou yards, the first sheet was laid in September 2012. The ship was launched in July 2013 and delivered in September 2013. NavOcéan, of subsidiary of DCI and Piriou, are responsible for its operation.

Almak has a gateway with a vision of 360 °. Navigation equipment, including radar and synthetic mapping, are suitable for cadet training. Its draft of 3.1 meters is suited to learning and facilitates navigation in coastal areas. The ship is 44 meters long with a beam of 9.6 meters. It carries a crew of eight sailors and embeds one teacher and 16 students.

Almak has two engines of 662 kilowatts with 2 shafts and two controllable pitch propellers (HPV) that can reach a speed of 12 knots. It has an autonomy of 10 days sailing at 10 knots. These Piriou sites participate in its operation via navOcean, who services Almak in Concarneau.

== Capacity ==
Almak plans to train a dozen cadets of Saudi Arabia, Kuwait, Libya and Qatar and will provide 35–40 weeks of sailing per year. The ship can be used for receiving trainee divers for surveillance missions and experimental navigation equipment.

Initially, Almak will operate from Brest and include Kuwaiti cadets attending the Naval School of Lanvéoc-Poulmic CENOE under the program (course for foreign officers).

== See also ==
- Training ship
- Piriou
