= Dumaresq =

Mechanical calculating device

A Mark VIII dumaresq depicting a typical scenario.

The Dumaresq is a mechanical calculating device invented around 1902 by Lieutenant John Dumaresq of the Royal Navy. It is an analog computer that relates vital variables of the fire control problem to the movement of one's own ship and that of a target ship.

It was often used with other devices, such as a Vickers range clock, to generate range and deflection data so the gun sights of the ship could be continuously set. A number of versions of the Dumaresq were produced of increasing complexity as development proceeded.

== Geometric principle ==
The dumaresq relies on sliding and rotating bars and dials to represent the motion of the two ships.

Normally the motion of the ship carrying the dumaresq is represented by a metal bar running above the instrument. Below the bar is a round metal plate inscribed with a coordinate plot, and an angle scale around its outer rim. The fixed bar is mounted on a bearing that allows it to be turned to represent the direction of motion of the ship, measured against the scale. Hanging down from the metal bar is a device that is slid along the bar to represent the speed of the ship. This sliding part is normally in the form of a ring, sometimes referred to as the "inclination ring", that is suspended just above the coordinate plate.

The motion of the enemy ship is represented by a bar connected to the sliding ring, the "enemy bar". This is normally in the form of a long pointer that extends from the ring towards the edge of the plot, which allows the angle of the enemy ship to be input by rotating the pointer (and ring) as measured against the angle scale at the edge of the plot. A smaller pointer connected to this bar, the "enemy pointer", extends downward from the bar, and can slide along it to represent the speed of the enemy ship.

The central coordinate plate also rotates, which is used to represent the current bearing to the target. When correctly set, the enemy pointer will point to a location on the coordinate plate. The coordinates can be read to directly provide the "range rate" (the component of motion along the line of bearing) and "dumaresq deflection" (or "speed across", the component perpendicular to the range rate). This was normally measured as the yards per minute in range and knots in deflection. Based on the time-of-flight using the instantaneous range between the two ships at the time of firing, these two measurements are added to the initial calculation of the firing solution to produce the corrections for motion.

Because the dumaresq is an analogue model of the relative motion of the two ships, it does not intrinsically favour which of its settings is an input and which is an output - one can use the centre bar to represent the enemy ship motion and the moving portions to represent the dumaresq ship. This allows it to be used "backwards", a process called a "cross cut", to take sequential estimates of the range and bearing of an enemy vessel and discover its speed and heading that would be consistent.

To aid the operation of the system, the dumaresq is normally co-located with instruments showing the direction and speed of the ship, while the operators set the enemy bearing, heading and speed based on calls from the rangetellers. In some versions, the rotation of the bar is automated through the use of a gyrocompass and selsyn, in other the speed input was automated using a Forbes Log.

== Mechanical design ==
The design of the dumaresq consists of a circular dial with a cross-bar passing over the centre which is oriented to match the heading of one's own ship. A sliding assembly can be moved backwards along a scale etched on this bar to indicate the ship's speed in knots. Suspended below the slider is a second bar, which recorded the speed and heading of the enemy ship by rotating and sliding against a similar scale to that on the main cross-bar. The result of these two settings are such that the tip of the enemy bar records enemy movement minus own movement as a vector sum. This is equivalent to the relative motion of the target ship.

The base disc of the Dumaresq features a graph which can be rotated along the line of bearing. When so aligned, the axis along the line of bearing indicates the range rate and the perpendicular axis indicates speed across. A pointer stem dangling from the enemy ship bar allows the values to be easily read off in convenient units (in 1902, range rate was expressed as the number of seconds required for the range to alter 50 yards, but was soon standardised on yards per minute).

== Mark I ==
The mark I Dumaresq was manufactured by Elliott Brothers, who paid for and obtained a patent on the device in the name of its inventor, John Dumaresq, in August 1904. By 1906 the device had been amended to add a rifle-like sight for directly obtaining a bearing to the target ship. By 1913 approximately 1000 devices of various versions had been purchased by the Royal Navy at a cost of £10,000.

== Mark II ==
The mark II Dumaresq was the same as the Mark I, but larger and was in production by Elliotts by 1907. In 1909 it was proposed to add a compass ring to the dial plate, and another mounted on the cross bar for the enemy ship. This was added to a revised Mark II and Mark III versions.

== Mark IV ==
The mark IV version was developed in 1910, intended to be used within a gun turret operating independently from the centralised fire control. The device cost £4.50.

== Mark VI ==
This version included a hand wheel on the side, which rotated the dial plate, and with it the enemy bar. Relative direction of the enemy ship could be maintained to within a few degrees during a turn of the "own ship".

In 1908 Frederic Dreyer suggested an improvement, adding gears so that the enemy bar would alter direction automatically when the dial plate was rotated. This allowed an automatic correction of enemy direction as the home ship changed course. A similar "helm-free" Mark VI* model with a range and bearing clock and fixed dial plate permitted a gyrocompass input to automatically track own ship as it altered course, and was the one incorporated in the Dreyer Fire Control Table Mark III and III*. Such equipment was quite specialized to a larger fire control context.

== The electrical dumaresq ==
This model is the zenith in complexity for the dumaresq, and was created for use in the most modern Dreyer tables of WWI, the Mark IV and IV*. The electrical dumaresq's special features were very particular to its use in the Dreyer FCTs in which it was fitted, sitting atop a range clock. Like the Mark VI*, it was helm-free, a gyro applied own course continuously, and a bearing clock tried to keep the bearing plate set appropriately. Its new wrinkle was an elaborate electrical device which would, when engaged, continuously and automatically apply the indicated range rate to its range clock and convert the indicated speed-across to a gunnery deflection at the present range. These special accoutrements were overtaking the inherent complexity of the dumaresqs themselves.

== Mark VIII ==
This dumaresq (as Admiralty pattern 5969A) lasted into service through WWII. It was compact, had a fixed cross-bar and special gearing maintained enemy heading when alterations to own heading were made. All adjustments were manual on this model. A special graph spindle in the dial plate oriented along the speed-across axis could be spun to the present gun range and could quickly convert the speed-across to a gun deflection. That this was done by simple thumb work suggests that this dumaresq was meant to operate in the absence of advanced systems such as the Admiralty Fire Control Table that was then in service.

== Wind dumaresq ==
Before World War I was over, a specialised dumaresq proposed by Captain FC Dreyer was incorporated into the Dreyer Fire Control Table alongside the main one to track and nullify the influence of cross-range winds on the shells as they flew toward the target. In the wind dumaresq, the vector bars subtracted own ship's motion from the real wind vector to produce the relative wind vector, which was called "wind you feel". A rolling spindle graph across the dial plate was spun to the present gun range and its markings indicated an additional correction to deflection to be applied to the gun sights in order to negate the crosswind's influence. This figure was read off by projecting the vector sum pipper to the roller graph.

== Post WWI ==
The more sophisticated dumaresqs slowly died out after WWI, their functionality being manifested in other hardware. The design of the dumaresq was not well-suited to integration in larger schemes of automated fire control. A wind dumaresq, however, can still be found in the transmitting stations of HMS Belfast and HMCS Sackville. Simple dumaresqs of almost regressive simplicity continued to be issued through WWII in auxiliaries and transports.

== Mark XI ==
An example of the Spartan dumaresqs that survived beyond World War I, these were very simple, with fixed cross-bars and an own-speed of 12 knots that could not be altered. The standard speed suggests it was intended for use in transport type ships in convoy. The dial plate lacks markings for range rate, implying the fire control staff of the ship would have no range clock at all and that this device was solely to give an idea of what deflection should be used on the gun sights. A further indication that these were to be used by less intensively trained personnel is that the dial plate helpfully features an image of a gun muzzle which is to be pointed toward the enemy ship.

== Mark XII ==
These were nearly identical to the Mark XI model, but had range rate markings on its dial plate. It must have been for convoy vessels with at least a Vickers range clock whose rate could be set according to this indication.

== Bibliography ==
- Brooks, John (2005). Dreadnought Gunnery at the Battle of Jutland: The Question of Fire Control. London: Routledge. doi:10.4324/9780203316207. ISBN 978-0-7146-5702-8. OCLC 762590708.
- C.B. 1456 Handbook for Captain F.C. Dreyer's Fire Control Tables. Royal Navy Admiralty. 1918.
- "B.R. 1534 Handbook on Minor Fire Control Instruments". Historic Naval Ship Association. 1946. Archived from the original on 19 August 2018.
