= Naval order of 24 October 1918 =

Cancelled 1918 German Imperial Navy operation

Op. 269/A I
- Part of Naval Operations in the First World War
- Location: 53°45′N 05°15′E
- Planned: 24 October 1918
- Planned by: Seekriegsleitung
- Target: Southern North Sea
- Objective: To engage the British Fleet in a decisive action
- Date: 30–31 October 1918
- Executed by: High Seas Fleet (Franz von Hipper)
- Outcome: Cancelled following rebellion in the High Seas Fleet

The naval order of 24 October 1918 was a plan made by the Seekriegsleitung of the Kaiserliche Marine (Imperial German Navy) to provoke a decisive battle between the German High Seas Fleet and the British Grand Fleet in the southern North Sea in the final weeks of the First World War. The plan was drawn up contrary to the wishes and without the knowledge of the German government. When the order to prepare for the sortie was issued on 29 October, resistance broke out aboard some of the German ships stationed at Wilhelmshaven. Despite the cancellation of the operation, the sailors' revolt led to the more serious Kiel mutiny, which began the German Revolution of 1918-19 and the establishment of the Weimar Republic.

== Background ==
=== Armistice negotiations ===
Following the Allied successes during the Hundred Days Offensive, the new German government under Prince Max of Baden, at the insistence of the Supreme Army Command, asked President Woodrow Wilson on 5 October 1918 to mediate an armistice. One of his conditions was the cessation of the German submarine war. Despite the objections of Admiral Reinhard Scheer, the Chief of the German Admiralty Staff, the German government made the concession on 20 October and submarines at sea were recalled on 21 October. On 22 October, Scheer on his authority and without the knowledge of the new German government, ordered Admiral Franz von Hipper, commander of the High Seas Fleet, to prepare for an attack on the British fleet by the main battle fleet, reinforced by the returning U-boats. Hipper's order was promulgated on 24 October; Scheer approved it on 27 October. The fleet then began to concentrate at Schillig Roads off Wilhelmshaven to prepare for the battle.

=== German fleet ===
The High Seas Fleet in October 1918 was built around the core of 18 battleships and 5 battlecruisers, most of which had been completed before the outbreak of war. Since the Battle of Jutland in May 1916, the obsolete pre-dreadnoughts had been de-commissioned, two new battleships with 15-inch guns (Baden and Bayern) and the new battlecruiser Hindenburg had joined the fleet, but one dreadnought battleship Rheinland had been damaged beyond repair by running aground in the Baltic. The fleet had undertaken only three major sorties at full strength into the North Sea since June 1916: 18–19 August 1916, 18–19 October 1916, and 22–25 April 1918. This prolonged period of relative inactivity, at a time when all other branches of Germany's armed forces were very heavily engaged, did much to undermine the morale of the crews and the self-respect of the officers. Acts tantamount to mutiny took place on various occasions during 1917, the most noteworthy being the arrest of 200 men from the battleship Prinzregent Luitpold in August, two of whom were executed.

=== Royal Navy ===
==== Grand Fleet ====
In late October 1918 the Grand Fleet, based at Rosyth in the Firth of Forth, had 35 dreadnought battleships and 11 battlecruisers (two of them of the very lightly armoured Courageous class). Twenty of these ships had been completed since the outbreak of war, and a third of them were armed with the highly effective 15-inch gun; the oldest capital ship in the fleet was HMS Indomitable, commissioned in June 1908, while HMS Dreadnought had been put in reserve in July 1918. Five of the ships were from the United States Navy and one from the Royal Australian Navy.

The materiel problems which beset the Grand Fleet at the Battle of Jutland and beyond (i.e. poor flash-protection in ammunition handling, lack of deck armour over magazines, deficient armour-piercing shells, and too few destroyers) had all been remedied to various extents. The new "Green Boy" shells for the heavy guns were thought to be such a great improvement in offensive power that they nullified the advantage of the heavier armour protection of German battleships. The fleet possessed new weapons (such as the Sopwith Cuckoo ship-borne torpedo-bombers and fast steam-driven submarines) for which the German fleet had no match.

The second wave of the Spanish Flu pandemic reached its peak in the Grand Fleet in autumn 1918; about 6 per cent of the fleet's sailors were taken ill, and 1 per cent died. The sick list of the light cruiser HMS Cardiff peaked at 19 men, 6 per cent of her complement, on 23 October 1918, but it had returned to normal (two men) by 31 October; the destroyer HMS Torch of the 12th Destroyer Flotilla was more seriously hit, with 37 (41 per cent) of her crew on the sick list on 31 October.

The morale in the British fleet was high in anticipation of a re-match for Jutland, the personality and leadership of the commander-in-chief, Admiral Sir David Beatty, being an important reason for this.

==== Admiralty intelligence ====
In the First World War British naval intelligence in general, and code-breaking in particular, was highly efficient. It played a very important role in the battles of Dogger Bank and Jutland, in the American entry into the war on the Allied side and the defeat of the U-boats from 1917 to 1918. By late 1917 improvements in German communications security had made intelligence gathering more difficult, at least as far as the High Seas Fleet was concerned. Between October 1917 and April 1918, the Germans were able to launch three surprise sorties into Norwegian waters against mercantile traffic, on the last occasion (22–25 April 1918) employing their whole fleet. Each time the British did not receive a warning in time to mount an effective counter-operation.

High-power wireless communications were essential for the control of U-boats at sea; but this also allowed triangulation-based location of the U-boats by the Allies. In addition, U-boats employed a simpler cypher system than that used by the surface fleet, which Room 40, the British Admiralty's code-breaking section, could usually read with few difficulties. In October 1918 these methods allowed the Admiralty to track the U-boats operating in British Home Waters.

== Prelude ==
=== Operational order ===
The order of 24 October for the High Seas Fleet's attack is as follows: (Note: Based on the English text given by Grant modified with reference to the partial German text and additional details found in the German official history.)

Commander of the High Seas Fleet

Op. 269/A I
SMS KAISER WILHELM II, (Note: Old battleship of the Kaiser Friedrich III class (launched 1897), acting as a static command ship in Wilhelmshaven.) 24.10.1918

VERY SECRET
O. MATTER
O.-COMMAND No.19. (Note: The complete German header of the message reads as follows: "Kommando der Hochseeflotte/Op. 269/A I/SMS KAISER WILHELM II den 24.10.1918/GANZ GEHEIM/O. SACHE/O.-BEFEHL Nr.19.")

A. Information about the enemy
It is to be supposed that most of the enemy forces are in Scottish east coast ports, with detachments in the Tyne, the Humber and the Channel.

B. Intentions
The enemy will be brought to battle under conditions favourable for us.

For this purpose, the concentrated High Seas forces (Note: German: Hochseestreitkräfte, literally: "high sea armed forces"; Admiral Hipper's formal title was Chef der Hochseestreitkräfte. Hochseeflotte (High Seas Fleet) presumably referred to surface forces alone, while Hochseestreitkräfte included U-boats and aircraft.) will advance by night into the Hoofden, and attack combat forces and mercantile traffic on the Flanders coast and in the Thames estuary. This strike should induce the enemy to advance immediately with detachments of his fleet (Note: German: Flottenteile, literally "fleet parts". To even the odds, the Germans would have preferred to engage isolated detachments of the Grand Fleet rather than the whole force; the British command would have endeavoured to keep the fleet concentrated to avoid this possibility, keeping faster units such as battlecruisers tied to the slower battleships.) toward the line Hoofden/German Bight. Our intention is to engage these detachments on the evening of Day II of the operation, or to have them attacked by torpedo-boats during the night of Day II or III. In support of the main task the approach routes of the enemy from east Scottish ports to the sea area of Terschelling will be infested by mines and occupied by submarines.

C. Execution
i) Departure from the German Bight by day, out of sight of the Dutch coast;
ii) Route through the Hoofden so that the attack on the Flanders Coast and the Thames Estuary takes place at dawn on Day II;
iii) The Attack:

a) against the Flanders coast by the commander of the 2nd Torpedo-Boat Flotilla with Graudenz, Karlsruhe, Nürnberg and the 2nd Torpedo-Boat Flotilla.
b) against the Thames estuary by the 2nd Scouting Group with Königsberg, Köln, Dresden, Pillau and the 2nd Torpedo-Boat Half-Flotilla
Covering of a) by the fleet and b) by the C-in-C of the Scouting Forces;

iv) Return so as to reach the combat area favourable to us, near Terschelling, one or two hours before nightfall on Day II.
v) Protection of the return (Day II) by part of the 8th Flotilla
vi) Mine laying by the leader of 4th Scouting Group with 4th Scouting Group (supported by minelayers by Arkona (Note: Both Grant and Gladisch spell her name this way. The only mine-warfare ship with the name Arkona listed in Gröner's standard reference work on German warships is the minesweeper M115, which bore that name in 1935–41. Thus presumably this is the old Gazelle-class cruiser Arcona (launched 1902), which was used as a mine-layer and base ship in the Ems.) and Möwe (Note: a disguised raider which had undertaken two very successful cruises in 1916 and 1917. She was also used as a mine-layer in the North Sea.)) and the 8th Flotilla, on the approaches of the enemy, in accord with plan No. I.
vii) Disposition of submarines on the enemy routes in accord with plan No. III
viii) Attack by torpedo-boats during the night of Day II to III, in case an encounter has already taken place, from near the Terschelling Light Vessel towards the Firth of Forth, in accordance with the orders of the commander of torpedo-boats. On the meeting of the torpedo-boats with the fleet in the morning of Day III, see the following order;
ix) Entrance into the German Bight by departure route or by routes 420, 500 or 750, depending on the situation;

x) Air reconnaissance: if possible.

=== U-boat operations ===
The command of the High Seas Fleet had 24 submarines at its disposal, which lay at their bases in the North Sea. The command tried to recall more boats from the missions and direct them to the planned locations. This succeeded with six more boats: U-43, U-108, UB-86, UB-96, UB-121, and UB-125. All boats were to form six lines in the North Sea on the presumed approach route of the British fleet and take up waiting positions in front of the ports of the British fleet in Scotland. (Note: The captain of UB-96, OLtzS. Walter Krastel, reportedly received sealed orders when he sailed from Heligoland on 12 October to be opened in the event of the cancellation of the U-boat war, instructing him to take up this position. This indicates that Hipper's plan may well have been in preparation for some time before 22 October.)

Two of these U-boats were lost. The first, U-78 (Oblt. Johann Vollbrecht), sailed on 27 October from Heligoland for a minelaying mission off the Scottish East Coast, but she was torpedoed and sunk the same day by the British submarine G2 in the central North Sea, roughly 280 nautical miles (520 km; 320 mi) east of the Firth of Forth. All 40 crewmen were lost.

The other submarine to be sunk was UB-116, which sailed from Heligoland on 25 October with special orders to attack the British fleet anchorage at Scapa Flow. She was commanded by the 26-year-old Oberleutnant zur See Hans Joachim Emsmann who, since first becoming a U-boat captain in February 1918, had sunk a total of 26 ships. (Note: Contrary to some sources, UB-116 did not have an all-officer volunteer crew.) She attempted to enter Scapa Flow submerged by the southern passage, Hoxa Sound, on the evening of 28 October. Hydrophones mounted ashore at Stanger Head, Flotta, alerted the British defences, and the sea-bed magnetometer loops, designed to detect the magnetic signatures of incoming vessels and thus trigger remote-controlled mines, were activated. Emsmann raised his periscope at 11:30 pm, presumably to check his position, and was spotted by look-outs on shore; the mines detonated shortly thereafter, leaving the submarine disabled on the sea bed. She was finished off by depth charges from defense trawlers shortly thereafter; all 37 crew members were lost. (Note: Emsmann's attempt was repeated more successfully 21 years later, when on 14 October 1939 Günther Prien entered Scapa Flow via the eastern channel, Holm Sound, and sank the battleship Royal Oak.)

Two other submarines, UB-98 and UB-118 were damaged in collision with each other on 28 October, and had to return to port. Five others, U-43, U-67, UB-86, UB-87, and UB-130 also aborted their missions due to breakdowns.

=== British reaction ===
The commanders of the British Fleet were anticipating action, and the fleet was warned to make preparations as early as 14 October 1918. On the afternoon of 23 October the Admiralty alerted Admiral Beatty that the situation was abnormal and that they would reinforce him by sending destroyers from the anti-submarine flotillas based at Plymouth and Buncrana. By late on 28 October the situation was reaching a climax, and Vice Admiral Sydney Fremantle, the Deputy Chief of the Naval Staff, and Rear Admiral Reginald Hall, the Director of Naval Intelligence, sent Beatty a full appreciation which read, in part:

Dispositions of enemy submarines combined with positions of their large minefield recently laid and now clear constitutes fairly decisive evidence of his desire to draw the Grand Fleet out ... No evidence of how he proposes to achieve this object but evidence that no move of his battlefleet can take place before ... tomorrow night. No objective of the enemy is apparent that will not involve great risk for him. Therefore he may confine himself to emerging from the Bight and returning after making us aware of his exit by W/T signals. Unlikely the enemy will risk fleet action until the Armistice negotiations are settled one way or another. Press reports of German submarines proceeding home via the Norwegian Coast probably emanate from Germany and are intended to conceal existence of submarine trap.

For the next 48 hours, Fremantle was able to keep Beatty informed of developments, correctly describing the concentration of the High Seas Fleet at Schillig Roads on the evening of 29 October and its intention to sail on 30 October. (Note: This close and continuous exchange of important intelligence between Room 40, the Naval Staff and the Commander-in-Chief was a noticeable improvement over the situation earlier in the war.) Hipper's unexpected postponement of the operation on 30 October was initially ascribed to fog.

=== Cancellation of the plan ===
The High Seas Fleet had assembled in Schillig Roads on the afternoon of 29 October in preparation for sailing the following day, 30 October. A ruse that the operation was a training sortie was employed for security, as was usual practice. The raid on the Thames and the Flanders Coast was scheduled for dawn on 31 October and the battle with the British Fleet in the afternoon and evening of the same day. The evening of 29 October was marked by unrest and serious acts of indiscipline in the German Fleet, as the men became convinced their commanders were intent on sacrificing them to sabotage the armistice negotiations. A large number of stokers from Derfflinger and Von der Tann failed to return from shore leave and were rounded up by the authorities; mass insubordination occurred on Thüringen, Kaiserin, Helgoland and Regensburg; and mutinous demonstrations took place in König, Kronprinz Wilhelm and Markgraf. Even in the fleet flagship Baden the mood of the crew was dangerous. The mutinous behavior was confined to the crews of the larger ships; the crews of torpedo-boats, submarines, and minesweepers remained loyal. Admiral Hipper canceled the operation on 30 October and ordered the fleet to disperse, in the hope of quelling the insurrection. When ships of the III Battle Squadron, arrived at Kiel via the Kaiser Wilhelm Canal on 1 November, their men helped spark the Kiel mutiny on 3 November.

== Aftermath ==
=== Analysis ===
The detailed orders of battle are given in the Appendix, and are summarised in the table below. The disparity in forces was roughly 2-to-1 in favour of the British. Had the battle been joined, it would have involved some 69 capital ships (in comparison with 58 involved at Jutland).

Ship category	Grand Fleet	Other British forces	German fleet
Dreadnought battleships	35	0	18
Battlecruisers	11	0	5
Armoured cruisers	3	0	0
Light cruisers	36	9	14
Aircraft carriers (Note: Only including flat-deck vessels.)	3	0	0
Flotilla leaders, destroyers (Note: Only including destroyers built after 1913 (i.e. the Laforey class and later ships).) and torpedo-boats (Note: The German Navy's large torpedo boats (großer Torpedoboote) were of similar size and function to the destroyers in the Royal Navy; the vessels of the German II. TBF were special larger vessels officially classified as destroyers (Zerstörer).)	160	44	60
Submarines	14	58	25/30 (Note: According to Groß, 25 U-boats were to be deployed, Spindler gives a figure of 30 submarines. Two of the submarines were sunk by the British (U 78 and UB 116), a further seven boats aborted their missions due to technical faults and/or collisions, so that, according to Spindler, 21 submarines could have been effectively deployed.)
Total	262	111	122-127

Writing after the war, Admiral Scheer asserted that "it was highly probable an expedition of the Fleet might achieve a favourable result. If the Fleet suffered losses, it was to be assumed that the enemy's injuries would be in proportion, and that we should still have sufficient forces to protect the U-boat campaign in the North Sea, which would have to be resumed if the negotiations should make imperative a continuation of the struggle with all the means at our disposal." The High Seas Fleet had undertaken similar diversionary attacks intended to draw British units into a submarine/mine ambush before: the action of 19 August 1916 was the one occasion when this tactic came closest to succeeding. On 27 October, the German Government had agreed to surrender the fleet as part of the armistice; thus in strictly material terms, the German Navy had nothing to lose.

Admiral Beatty's intentions are not recorded but there seems no doubt that he would have sailed as soon as the Germans were reported to be at sea and would have aggressively pursued battle. Given the distances involved, if the German sortie were reported promptly and the Grand Fleet sailed immediately on receipt of such a report, there was every possibility that they could have cut off the German line of retreat and forced a fight to the finish. (Note: The distance from Rosyth to Terschelling is approximately 350 nautical miles (400 mi; 650 km), while the distance that the German forces would have had to cover, from Wilhelmshaven to the Thames and then back to Terschelling is roughly 400 nautical miles (460 mi; 740 km). The Germans would have been delayed some hours by their attacks on the Thames and along the Flanders coast, and presumably in fighting with the British forces based at Harwich and Dover. The British relied on submarines patrolling in the German Bight to give warning of German fleet sorties. This was far from infallible: the failure of the British to intercept the High Seas Fleet sortie to Norway in April 1918 was principally due to the failure of a British submarine commander (Lt. Cdr. Geoffrey Warburton DSO of J6) to send a sighting report when he spotted the German fleet sailing through his patrol area.) Admiral Hipper and his staff seemed well aware of the risk in this plan, and his chief of staff Adolf von Trotha expressed a sanguinary attitude about it: "a battle for the honour of the fleet in this war, even if it were a death battle, it would be the foundation for a new German fleet".

Henry Newbolt, the official historian of the Royal Navy during the First World War, compared Hipper's planned operation with Michiel de Ruyter's Raid on the Medway in June 1667, when the Dutch Fleet launched a surprise attack on the English naval bases in the Thames estuary, inflicting a serious defeat and in consequence securing a more favourable peace treaty for the Netherlands at the end of the Second Anglo-Dutch War.

More recently, it has been argued that the plan was a deliberate act of counter-revolution by the German Naval High Command against Prince Max of Baden and the peace party: regardless of the outcome of the battle, the launching of the attack would have hopelessly compromised the armistice negotiations and the credibility of Prince Max's government. Historian Michael Epkenhans describes the action as a mutiny by the admirals:

When we think of the end of the war in 1918, we have to imagine admirals who had hoped throughout the war to be able to fight a major naval battle, perhaps even to defeat the British. The naval leadership was basically itself mutinous; it was an admirals' rebellion, because contrary to the orders of the political Reich leadership to hold back, especially in regard to the armistice, it made plans that were not politically legitimized.

== Orders of battle ==
=== German fleet ===
The German fleet was to be organised into three groups, plus supporting submarines and airships, as follows

- High Seas Fleet
  - Commander-in-Chief, High Seas Fleet: Admiral Franz Ritter von Hipper in battleship Baden
- Scouting forces
  - Commander, Scouting Forces: RAdm Ludwig von Reuter in battlecruiser Hindenburg
    - I. SG (RAdm Reuter) battlecruisers: Hindenburg (F), Derfflinger, Moltke, Von der Tann, Seydlitz
    - II. SG (Cdre Viktor Harder) light cruisers: Königsberg (F), Karlsruhe, Pillau, Nürnberg, Köln, Dresden, Graudenz
  - Deputy Leader of Torpedo-Boats FKpt Hans Quaet-Faslem in light cruiser Frankfurt
    - II. TBF destroyers: (3. hf) G101, G104, V100, G103, G102; (4. hf) B97, B111, B109, B110, B112
    - I. TBF (detachment) torpedo boats: (2. hf) V130, S133, S135, S134, S139
    - VII. TBF (detachment) torpedo boats: (13. hf) S138, V83, S65, V78, S56
- Main body (under Commander-in-Chief)
  - III. BS (VAdm Hugo Kraft), battleships: König (F), Bayern, Grosser Kurfürst, Kronprinz Wilhelm, Markgraf
  - Fleet Flagship battleship: Baden (F, Adm Hipper)
  - I. BS (VAdm Friedrich Boedicker) battleships: Ostfriesland (F), Thüringen, Posen, Nassau, Oldenburg, Westfalen (Note: Westfalen had been allocated as a gunnery training ship since August 1918; she was however listed in the tactical order of battle for this operation.), Helgoland
  - IV. BS (VAdm Hugo Meurer) battleships: Friedrich der Grosse (F), König Albert, Kaiserin, Prinzregent Luitpold, Kaiser
  - Leader of Torpedo-Boats Cdre Paul Heinrich^{(GE)} in light cruiser Emden
    - I. TBF torpedo boats: (1. hf) V129, G39, G86, G40, G38, S32
    - V. TBF torpedo boats: (9. hf) G11, V6, V3, V2; (10. hf) G8, G10, V5
    - VI. TBF torpedo boats: (11. hf) V128, V127, S132, S131, V126, V125; (12. hf) V43, V45, V44, S49, S50, V46
    - IX. TBF torpedo boats: (17. hf) V80, S52, S51, S60, S36
- Minelaying group
  - IV. SG (RAdm Johannes von Karpf^{(GE)}) light cruisers: Regensburg (F), Bremse, Brummer, Strassburg, Stralsund; attached minelayers: Arcona, Möwe
  - VIII. TBF torpedo boats: (15. hf) T180, T193, T192, T195, T190, T189; (16. hf) torpedo boats: T178, T179, T176, T186
- Airships: L65, L64, L63, L52, L61, L56, SL22
- Submarines: thirty U-boats were assigned to this operation, in six patrol lines: U-43, U-52, U-53, U-62, U-78, U-86, U-91, U-94, U-96, U-100, U-107, U-108, U-113, U-162, UB-64, UB-67, UB-80, UB-86, UB-87, UB-93, UB-96, UB-98, UB-116, UB-118, UB-121, UB-125, UB-126, UB-130, UB-131, UC-58.

=== Anglo-American ===
This is the administrative order of battle of the Grand Fleet and other important commands in Home Waters on 11 November 1918. Excluded from this list are ships on detached service and minor vessels of war such as minesweepers, sloops and older vessels employed on patrol duties; it includes only forces likely to have been engaged had the German sortie gone ahead. Some of these ships may not in fact have been available to sail on 30 October due to breakdowns or routine maintenance. The Grand Fleet was based at Rosyth, with usually one Squadron detached to Scapa Flow for gunnery training.

- Grand Fleet
  - Commander-in Chief: Adm Sir David Beatty in battleship Queen Elizabeth (attached destroyer: Oak)
  - 1st BS (Adm Sir Charles Madden) battleships: Revenge (F), Emperor of India, Iron Duke, Benbow, Marlborough, Canada, Ramillies, Resolution, Royal Oak, Royal Sovereign (attached cruiser: Blonde)
  - 2nd BS (VAdm Sir John de Robeck) battleships: King George V (F), Orion, Ajax, Centurion, Conqueror, Monarch, Thunderer, Agincourt, Erin (attached cruiser: Bellona)
  - 4th BS (VAdm Sir Montague Browning) battleships: Hercules (F), Colossus, Bellerophon, Collingwood, Neptune, St. Vincent (attached cruiser: Boadicea)
  - 5th BS (VAdm A C Leveson) battleships: Barham (F), Malaya, Valiant, Warspite (attached cruiser: Blanche)
  - 6th BS (RAdm H Rodman) battleships: New York^{(USN)} (F), Arkansas^{(USN)}, Florida^{(USN)}, Texas^{(USN)}, Wyoming^{(USN)}
- Cruisers (with main body)
  - 2nd CS (RAdm E F Bruen) armoured cruisers: Minotaur (F), Cochrane, Shannon
  - 4th LCS (RAdm A F Everett) light cruisers: Calliope (F), Cambrian, Caroline, Comus, Cordelia, Constance
  - 7th LCS (RAdm G H Borrett) light cruisers: Carysfort (F), Aurora, Penelope, Undaunted, Cleopatra
- Flying Squadron (RAdm R F Phillimore) (Note: embarked aircraft: Furious: 6 Sopwith Camel fighters, 14 Sopwith 1½ Strutter spotter aircraft; Vindictive: 4 Grain Griffin reconnaissance aircraft, 1 Sopwith Pup fighter; Argus: landing trials with 1½ Strutters and Pups; No. 185 Squadron RAF was formed on 19 October at East Fortune with 18 Sopwith Cuckoo torpedo bombers for service in Argus, although these do not seem to have embarked before the armistice; Campania: 4 Fairey Campania reconnaissance seaplanes, 7 1½ Strutters; Nairana: 5 Campanias, 2 Sopwith Baby fighter seaplanes; Pegasus: 3 Campanias, 1 Short Type 184 reconnaissance seaplanes, 5 Camels; battleships: 47 fighters, 19 reconnaissance aircraft; battle-cruisers: 13 fighters, 8 reconnaissance aircraft; light cruisers: 16 aircraft; total: 155 aircraft embarked.) aircraft carriers: Furious (F), Argus, Vindictive, Nairana, Pegasus, Campania (Note: sunk, 5 November 1918)
- Battlecruiser force
  - Commander-in-Chief: VAdm Sir William Pakenham in battlecruiser Lion
  - 1st BCS (RAdm Sir Henry Oliver) battlecruisers: Repulse (F), Renown, Tiger, Princess Royal
  - 2nd BCS (RAdm Sir Lionel Halsey) battlecruisers: New Zealand (F), Australia^{(RAN)}, Inflexible, Indomitable
  - 1st CS (VAdm T D W Napier) battlecruisers: Courageous (F), Glorious
  - 1st LCS (RAdm W H Cowan): Inconstant (F), Galatea, Royalist, Phaeton, Caledon
  - 2nd LCS (RAdm J A Fergusson): Birmingham (F), Dublin, Melbourne^{(RAN)}, Sydney^{(RAN)}, Yarmouth
  - 3rd LCS (RAdm A T Hunt): Chatham (F), Southampton, Chester, Birkenhead
  - 6th LCS (RAdm E S Alexander-Sinclair): Cardiff (F), Calypso, Caradoc, Cassandra, Ceres
- Destroyer Command
  - Commodore (Destroyers): Cdre H J Tweedie in light cruiser Castor
  - 3rd DF leaders: Nimrod, Talisman; destroyers: Maenad, Mameluke, Marvel, Menace, Michael, Munster, Napier, Noble, Nonsuch, Onslaught, Petard; temporarily attached from 4th DF (Devonport): Lawford, Nizam, Norseman, Oracle, Oriana, Orpheus
  - 11th DF leaders: Valorous, Seymour, Kempenfelt; destroyers: Romola, Sarpedon, Tancred, Tenacious, Tormentor, Vancouver, Vanessa, Vanity, Versatile, Viscount, Vittoria, Vivacious, Vortigern, Voyager, Walker, Walrus, Watchman
  - 12th DF leaders: Valhalla, Saumarez; destroyers: Scimitar, Scotsman, Scout, Scythe, Seabear, Sepoy, Simoom, Sirdar, Speedy, Tomahawk, Torch, Trinidad, Tryphon, Vivien, Waterhen, Winchester, Wolsey, Wrestler
  - 13th DF light cruiser: Champion, leaders: Valentine, Valkyrie; destroyers: Vimiera, Vega, Vectis, Violent; Vendetta, Verulam, Wakeful, Westminster; Verdun, Viceroy, Vesper, Venetia; Wolfhound, Ursa, Ursula, Urchin; Umpire, Ulster, Tower, Tristram; Vidette, Winchelsea, Westcott; Windsor, Whitley, Woolston, Walpole, Wessex
  - 14th DF leaders: Vampire, Anzac; destroyers: Medina, Norman, Octavia, Opportune, Orford, Paladin, Patriot, Pellew, Penn, Peregrine, Peyton, Plover, Plucky, Pylades, Relentless, Sabre, Seafire, Seraph, Somme, Sparrowhawk, Splendid, Tactician, Tobago, Tyrant, Velox, Warwick, Whirlwind; due to transfer to 1st DF but temporarily retained by 14th DF: Nonpareil, Observer, Offa, Orestes
  - 15th DF leaders: Parker, Grenville; destroyers: Patrician, Radstock, Raider, Rapid, Ready, Restless, Rigorous, Rob Roy, Rocket, Rosalind, Rowena, Sable, Sabrina, Salmon, Sorceress, Tirade, Trenchant, Undine; temporarily attached from 2nd DF (Buncrana): Marne, Medway, Michael, Mystic, Nicator, Pelican
  - 21st DF (transferring from 6th DF, Dover) leaders: Botha, Douglas, Swift; destroyers: Mansfield, Melpomene, Milne, Miranda, Moorsom, Murray, Nugent, Phoebe
- Harwich Force
  - 5th LCS (RAdm Sir Reginald Tyrwhitt) light cruisers: Curacoa (F), Coventry, Curlew, Concord, Centaur, Conquest, Danae, Dragon
  - 10th DF leaders: Spenser, Shakespeare, Bruce, Montrose; destroyers: Radiant, Redgauntlet, Redoubt, Retriever, Satyr, Sceptre, Sharpshooter, Skate, Skilful, Springbok, Starfish, Stork, Sturgeon, Swallow, Sybille, Sylph, Taurus, Teazer, Tempest, Tetrarch, Thisbe, Thruster, Torrid, Truculent
- Dover Force
  - 6th DF (Dover) leader: Broke; modern destroyers: Manly, Mastiff, Meteor, Morris, Termagant, Trident, Afridi, Amazon, Cossack, Crusader, Viking, Zubian
- Minelaying destroyers
  - 20th DF (Immingham) leaders: Abdiel, Gabriel, destroyers: Tarpon, Telemachus, Vanoc, Vanquisher, Venturous, Ferret, Legion, Prince, Sandfly
- Submarines operating with the Battle Fleet
  - 12th S/MF: light cruiser: Fearless; submarines: K2, K3, K5, K6, K7, K8, K15
  - 13th S/MF: leader: Ithuriel; K9, K10, K11, K12, K14, K16, K22
- North Sea patrols
  - 8th S/MF (Yarmouth) submarines: H21, H28, H29, H30, V1, V2
  - 9th S/MF (Harwich) submarines: E29, E31, E41, E43, E45, E51, E52, E53, E56, L9, L15, L14, L17, C23, C25
  - 10th S/MF (Tees) submarines: E27, E33, E39, E40, E42, E44, G6, G12, G13, L11, L12, L16
  - 11th S/MF (Blyth) submarines: G1, G2, G3, G4, G5, G10, J2, J3, J4, J5, J6, J7
  - 14th S/MF (Blyth) submarines: H8, H11, H12, H14, H15, H22, H23, H24, H25, H26, L8, R1, R2, R9, R12

=== Abbreviations ===
- Adm: Admiral
- BCS: Battle Cruiser Squadron
- BS: Battle Squadron (German: Geschwader)
- Cdre: Commodore (German: Kommodore)
- CS: Cruiser Squadron
- DF: Destroyer Flotilla
- F: Flagship
- FKpt: Fregattenkapitän (frigate captain)
- hf: half-flotilla (German: halbflottille)
- LCS: Light Cruiser Squadron
- RAdm: Rear Admiral (German: Konteradmiral)
- ^{(RAN)}: Denotes a ship of the Royal Australian Navy
- S/MF: Submarine Flotilla
- SG: Scouting Group (German: Aufklärungsgruppe)
- TBF: Torpedo-Boat Flotilla (German: Torpedoboot Flottille)
- ^{(USN)}: Denotes a ship of the United States Navy
- VAdm: Vice Admiral (German: Vizeadmiral)

== Bibliography ==
- Beesly, Patrick (1984). Room 40: British Naval Intelligence, 1914–1918. Oxford: Oxford University Press. ISBN 0-19-281468-0.
- Deist, Wilhelm (1966). "Die Politik der Seekriegsleitung und die Rebellion der Flotte Ende Oktober 1918" [The Policy of the Naval Staff and the Rebellion of the Fleet in late October 1918] (PDF). Vierteljahrshefte für Zeitgeschichte (in German) (14). Munich: Institut für Zeitgeschichte: 341–368. ISSN 0042-5702.
- F. J. Dittmar and J. J. Colledge (1972), British Warships 1914–1919 (Shepperton: Ian Allan Ltd. SBN 7110 0380 7).
- Admiral Walter Gladisch ^{(GE)} (1965), Der Krieg zur See 1914-18/Nordsee Bd.7 (Frankfurt: Verlag E S Mittler & Sohn). New critical edition: Gerhard P. Groß (ed.) assisted by Werner Rahn: Der Krieg in der Nordsee. Vom Sommer 1917 bis zum Kriegsende 1918. Hamburg/Berlin/Bonn 2006 (Der Krieg zur See 1914–1918, Bd. 7).
- Robert M. Grant (1969), U-Boat Intelligence 1914–1918 (London: Putnam).
- Erich Gröner^{(GE)}(1983), Die deutschen Kriegsschiffe 1815–1945, Bd.2: Torpedoboote, Zerstörer, Schnellboote, Minensuchboote, Minenräumboote (Koblenz: Bernard & Graefe Verlag. ISBN 3-7637-4801-6).
- Prof. Arthur J. Marder (1969), From the Dreadnought to Scapa Flow, The Royal Navy in the Fisher Era, 1904–1919: Victory and Aftermath volume 5 (Oxford: Oxford University Press).
- Newbolt, Henry (1931). Naval Operations. History of the Great War Based on Official Documents. Vol. V. London: Longmans, Green.
- Tobias R. Philbin III (1982), Admiral von Hipper: The Inconvenient Hero (Amsterdam: B. R. Grüner Publishing Co. ISBN 90-6032-200-2).
- Reinhard Scheer (1920), Germany's High Seas Fleet in the World War Archived 15 June 2013 at the Wayback Machine, English edition (London: Cassell and Company, Ltd.), Ch.18.
- Rear Admiral Arno Spindler (1966), Der Krieg zur See 1914–18/Handelskrieg mit U-booten, Bd.5 (Frankfurt: Verlag E S Mittler & Sohn).
