= HMS E54 =

Submarine of the Royal Navy

History

United Kingdom
- Name: E54
- Builder: William Beardmore, Dalmuir
- Laid down: 1 February 1915
- Launched: 1916
- Commissioned: May 1916
- Fate: Sold, 14 December 1921

General characteristics
- Class & type: E-class submarine
- Displacement: 662 long tons (673 t) surfaced; 807 long tons (820 t) submerged
- Length: 181 ft (55 m)
- Beam: 15 ft (4.6 m)
- Propulsion: 2 × 800 hp (597 kW) diesel; 2 × 420 hp (313 kW) electric; 2 screws
- Speed: 15 knots (28 km/h; 17 mph) surfaced; 10 knots (19 km/h; 12 mph) submerged
- Range: 3,000 nmi (5,600 km) at 10 kn (19 km/h; 12 mph) surfaced; 65 nmi (120 km) at 5 kn (9.3 km/h; 5.8 mph) submerged
- Complement: 31
- Armament: 5 × 18 inch (450 mm) torpedo tubes (2 bow, 2 beam, 1 stern); 1 × 12-pounder gun

HMS E54 was a British E-class submarine built by William Beardmore, Dalmuir. She was laid down on 1 February 1915 and was commissioned in May 1916. She sank the German submarines UC-10 on 21 August 1916 and U-81 on 1 May 1917. E54 was sold for scrap on 14 December 1921.

== Design ==
Like all post-E8 British E-class submarines, E54 had a displacement of 662 long tons (673 t) at the surface and 807 long tons (820 t) while submerged. She had a total length of 180 feet (55 m) and a beam of 22 feet 8.5 inches (6.922 m). She was powered by two 800 horsepower (600 kW) Vickers eight-cylinder two-stroke diesel engines and two 420 horsepower (310 kW) electric motors. The submarine had a maximum surface speed of 16 knots (30 km/h; 18 mph) and a submerged speed of 10 knots (19 km/h; 12 mph). British E-class submarines had fuel capacities of 50 long tons (51 t) of diesel and ranges of 3,255 miles (5,238 km; 2,829 nmi) when travelling at 10 knots (19 km/h; 12 mph). E54 was capable of operating submerged for five hours when travelling at 5 knots (9.3 km/h; 5.8 mph).

E54 was armed with a 12-pounder 76 mm (3.0 in) QF gun mounted forward of the conning tower. She had five 18 inch (450 mm) torpedo tubes, two in the bow, one either side amidships, and one in the stern; a total of 10 torpedoes were carried.

E-Class submarines had wireless systems with 1 kilowatt (1.3 hp) power ratings; in some submarines, these were later upgraded to 3 kilowatts (4.0 hp) systems by removing a midship torpedo tube. Their maximum design depth was 100 feet (30 m) although in service some reached depths of below 200 feet (61 m). Some submarines contained Fessenden oscillator systems.

== Service ==
In July 1916, E54 was listed as being part of the 8th Submarine Flotilla, part of the Harwich Force. On 29 June 1916, E54 left Harwich to take part in the regular patrol by British submarines near Terschelling, returning to base on 6 July. On 15 August 1916, E54 left Harwich for a patrol off the Dutch coast with the hope of intercepting Zeebrugge-bound German submarines. On 20 August, while carrying out this patrol, E54 sighted a German submarine and fired two torpedoes which missed. Two more German submarines were sighted that day, but E54 did not manage to get into a position to deliver an attack against these submarines. On 21 August, E54 spotted a fourth submarine, the minelaying submarine UC-10, which was returning from a minelaying mission off the Humber estuary, near the Schouwen Bank lightship. E54 and attacked with two torpedoes, one of which struck UC-10, sinking the German submarine with all hands. An early example of a Jolly Roger flag flown on return to port after this attack is on display at the Royal Navy Submarine Museum.

From 19–27 February 1917, E54, together with the submarines D3, D7 and E32, and supported by the depot ship Vulcan, patrolled off the West coast of Ireland in order to counter German submarine attacks. From the end of March, E54, together with E32, E48 and H5, was deployed to Queenstown (now Cobh) in the South of Ireland for continued anti-submarine patrols. On 29 April 1917, E54 was on patrol south of Ireland when a surfaced submarine was sighted. E54 attacked twice, firing a single torpedo each time, but the attacks were unsuccessful and the target passed out of view. On the morning of 1 May, E54 sighted and attacked another submarine, but her torpedoes again missed. Later that day, an explosion was heard by E54's crew, and on going to investigate, spotted a steamer (the British ship Dorie) blowing off steam and down by the bow. E54 dived and then spotted the German submarine U-81, which had torpedoed Dorie and had surfaced to finish off the steamer. E54 fired two torpedoes at U-81, both of which hit, sinking the German submarine. E54 picked up seven survivors from U-81 and after determining that Dorie could still make port unassisted, returned to Queenstown to land her prisoners and replenish torpedoes. E54's commanding officer, Lieutenant-Commander Robert Raikes was awarded a bar to his Distinguished Service Order (i.e. a second award of the DSO).

On 16 May 1917, E54, which was now operating out of Lough Swilly, was cruising off the Hebrides when a German submarine (probably U-30) and attacked with two torpedoes that missed. Later that day, U-30 torpedoed the British merchant ship Middlesex, which broadcast a distress signal before sinking. The next day E54 spotted Middlesex's boats, and was approaching them when the British destroyer Rapid opened fire, forcing E54 to dive, and followed up with a depth charge before rescuing Middlesex's crew.

In July 1917, E54 was listed as being part of "Vulcan's Flotilla" as part of the Northern Division of the Coast of Ireland Station and based at Rathmullan on Lough Swilly. By August, E54 had moved with the Flotilla to Killybegs, on the Atlantic coast of County Donegal. In October 1917, the flotilla, including E54 had moved to the Southern Division and was based at Berehaven. In August 1918, E54 was listed as being based at Gibraltar. E54 remained at Gibraltar at the end of the war on 11 November 1918.

In February 1919, E54 was listed as attached to HMS Vernon, the torpedo school at Portsmouth. In July that year, while still attached to Vernon, E54 was noted as having a special complement. E54 was sold for scrap on 14 December 1921.

== Bibliography ==
- Dittmar, F. J.; Colledge, J. J. (1972). British Warships 1914–1919. Shepperton, UK: Ian Allan. ISBN 0-7110-0380-7.
- Harrison, A. N. (January 1979). "The Development of HM Submarines From Holland No. 1 (1901) to Porpoise (1930) (BR3043)". RN Subs.
- Hutchinson, Robert (2001). Jane's Submarines: War Beneath the Waves from 1776 to the Present Day. London: HarperCollins. ISBN 978-0-00-710558-8. OCLC 53783010.
- Kemp, Paul (1997). U-Boats Destroyed: German Submarine Losses in the World Wars. London: Arms & Armour Press. ISBN 1-85409-321-5.
- Monograph No. 33: Home Waters Part VII: From June 1916 to November 1916 (PDF). Naval Staff Monographs (Historical). Vol. XVII. Naval Staff, Training and Staff Duties Division. 1927.
- Monograph No. 34: Home Waters Part VIII: December 1916 to April 1917 (PDF). Naval Staff Monographs (Historical). Vol. XVIII. Naval Staff, Training and Staff Duties Division. 1933.
- Monograph No. 35: Home Waters—Part IX.: 1st May, 1917 to 31st July, 1917 (PDF). Naval Staff Monographs (Historical). Vol. XIX. The Naval Staff, Training and Staff Duties Division. 1939.
