= HMS E34 =

Submarine of the Royal Navy

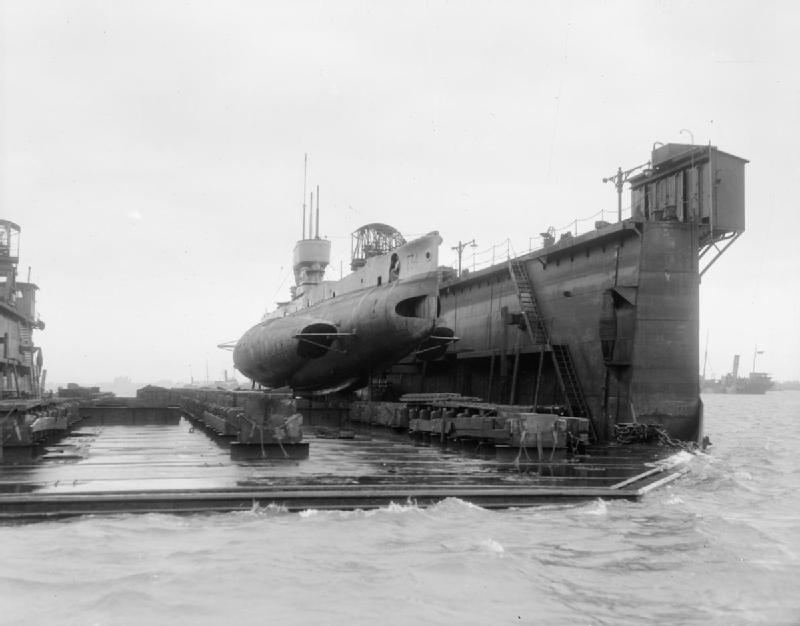
- E34 in a floating dock

History

United Kingdom
- Name: E34
- Builder: John Thornycroft, Woolston, Hampshire
- Launched: 27 January 1917
- Commissioned: March 1917
- Fate: Sunk by mine, 20 July 1918

General characteristics
- Class & type: E-class submarine
- Displacement: 662 long tons (673 t) surfaced; 807 long tons (820 t) submerged
- Length: 181 ft (55 m)
- Beam: 15 ft (4.6 m)
- Propulsion: 2 × 800 hp (597 kW) diesel; 2 × 420 hp (313 kW) electric; 2 screws
- Speed: 15 knots (28 km/h; 17 mph) surfaced; 10 knots (19 km/h; 12 mph) submerged
- Range: 3,000 nmi (5,600 km) at 10 kn (19 km/h; 12 mph) surfaced; 65 nmi (120 km) at 5 kn (9.3 km/h; 5.8 mph) surfaced
- Complement: 31
- Armament: 3 × 18 inch (450 mm) torpedo tubes (2 bow, 1 stern); 1 × 12-pounder gun

HMS E34 was a British E-class submarine built by John Thornycroft, Woolston, Hampshire. She was launched on 27 January 1917 and commissioned in March 1917. HMS E34 sank the U-boat UB-16 off Harwich in the North Sea on 10 May 1918. E34 was a mine-laying submarine.

E34 was mined near the Eijerlandse Gronden, the sands between the Frisian Islands Texel and Vlieland on 20 July 1918. There were no survivors.

== Design ==
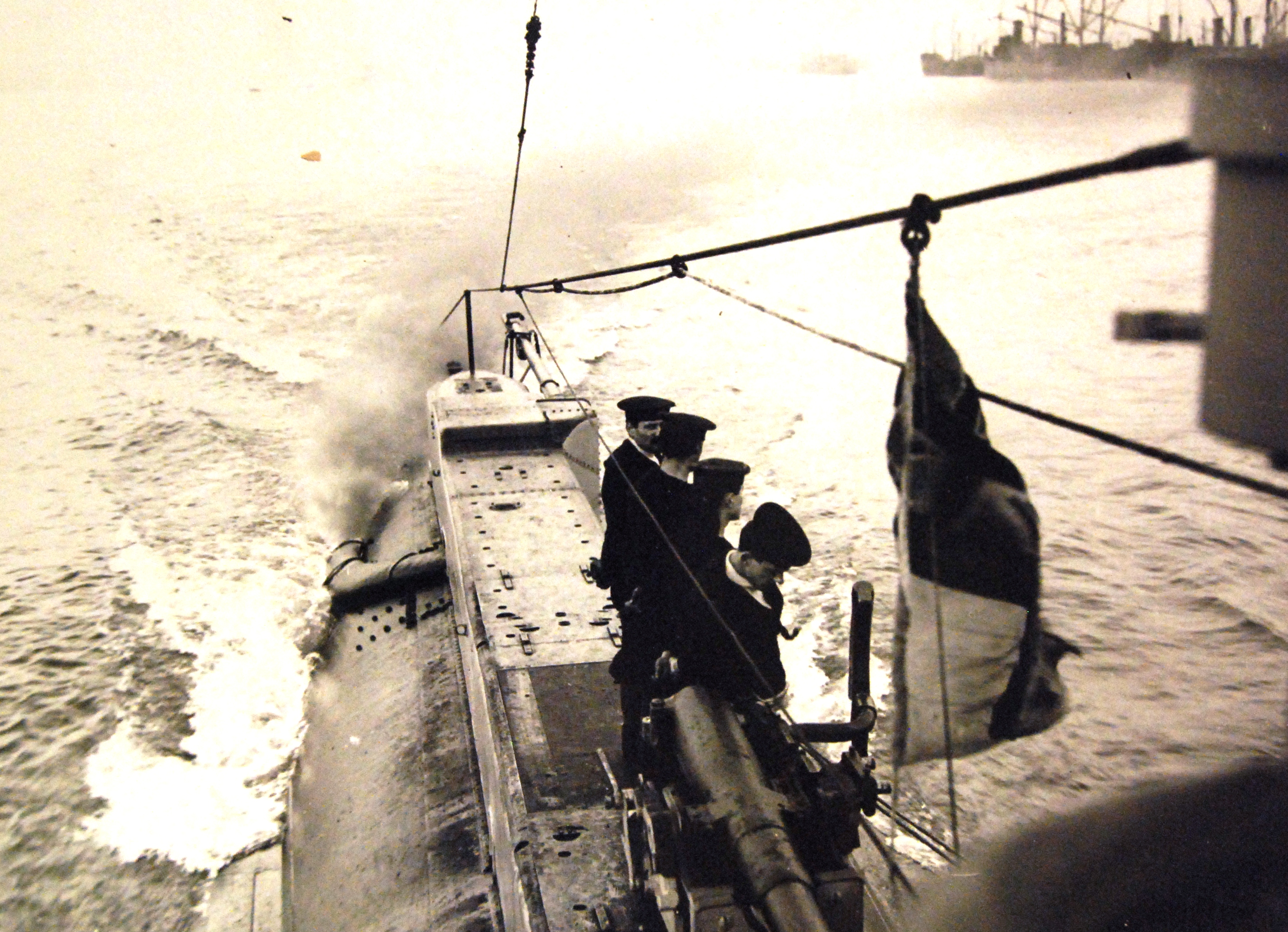
E34 leaving Harwich Harbor, England

Like all post-E8 British E-class submarines, E34 had a displacement of 662 long tons (673 t) at the surface and 807 long tons (820 t) while submerged. She had a total length of 180 feet (55 m) and a beam of 22 feet 8.5 inches (6.922 m). She was powered by two 800 horsepower (600 kW) Vickers eight-cylinder two-stroke diesel engines and two 420 horsepower (310 kW) electric motors. The submarine had a maximum surface speed of 16 knots (30 km/h; 18 mph) and a submerged speed of 10 knots (19 km/h; 12 mph). British E-class submarines had fuel capacities of 50 long tons (51 t) of diesel and ranges of 3,255 miles (5,238 km; 2,829 nmi) when travelling at 10 knots (19 km/h; 12 mph). E34 was capable of operating submerged for five hours when travelling at 5 knots (9.3 km/h; 5.8 mph).

E34 was armed with a 12-pounder 76 mm (3.0 in) QF gun mounted forward of the conning tower.

Like the other E-class minelaying submarines (E24, E41, E45, E46 and E51), E34 had three 18 inch (450 mm) torpedo tubes instead of five: two in the bow and one in the stern. Six torpedoes were carried. The two broadside torpedo tubes were replaced by mine tubes carrying a total of twenty mines.

E-Class submarines had wireless systems with 1 kilowatt (1.3 hp) power ratings; in some submarines, these were later upgraded to 3 kilowatts (4.0 hp) systems by removing a midship torpedo tube. Their maximum design depth was 100 feet (30 m) although in service some reached depths of below 200 feet (61 m). Some submarines contained Fessenden oscillator systems.

== Crew ==
Her complement was three officers and 28 men.

== Bibliography ==
- Hutchinson, Robert (2001). Jane's Submarines: War Beneath the Waves from 1776 to the Present Day. London: HarperCollins. ISBN 978-0-00-710558-8. OCLC 53783010.
