= E44 =

E44, E-44 or E.44 may refer to:

== Transportation ==
- European route E44, a road part of the E-road network
- E 44 road (United Arab Emirates)
- PRR E44, an American electric road switcher locomotive built for the Pennsylvania Railroad
- Kushiro Sotokan Road and Nemuro Road, route E44 in Japan

== Military ==
- HMS E44, a World War I-era British E-class submarine
