= E34 =

E34, E-34 or E.34 may refer to:

- BMW 5 Series (E34), an automobile manufactured by BMW between 1987 and 1996
- BMW M5 (E34), an automobile manufactured by BMW between 1988 and 1995
- European route E34, a highway connecting Germany and Belgium, via the Netherlands
- HMS E34, a United Kingdom Royal Navy submarine which saw service during World War I
- Oita Expressway, Nagasaki Expressway and Nagasaki-Dejima Road, route E34 in Japan
- VinFast VF e34, an electric subcompact crossover SUV made in Vietnam by VinFast
- Long Win Bus Route No. E34 in Hong Kong
