= E27 =

E27 or E-27 may refer to:

- European route E27
- E27 screw, 27 mm Edison screw light bulb cap
- HMS E27, a British submarine
- Maizuru-Wakasa Expressway, route E27 in Japan
- East Klang Valley Expressway, route E27 in Malaysia
