= E39 =

E39 may refer to:

- Tetrasodium EDTA, a cosmetics additive
- BMW 5 Series (E39), the BMW 5 Series mid-size luxury car manufactured between 1995 and 2003
- European route E39, a part of Norwegian national road system
- HMS E39, a British E class submarine
- E39 screw, a type of Edison screw
- Asahikawa-Monbetsu Expressway, route E39 in Japan
- Setiawangsa–Pantai Expressway, route E39 in Malaysia
