= E56 =

E56 may refer to:

- European route E56
- HMS E56
- Nimzo-Indian Defence, Encyclopaedia of Chess Openings code
- Kōchi Expressway (between Kochi IC and Shimantocho-chuo IC), Nakamura-Sukumo Road and Matsuyama Expressway (between Matsuyama IC and Tsushimawa-Matsu IC), route E56 in Japan
