= E33 =

E33 may refer to:

- Clair Obscur: Expedition 33, a 2025 role-playing video game
- Nimzo-Indian Defense, an Encyclopaedia of Chess Openings code
- HMS E33
- European route E33
- GE E33
- Duta–Ulu Klang Expressway, a route E33 in Malaysia
