= E47 =

E47 may refer to:

- European route E47, a road through Denmark between Sweden and Germany
- HMS E47, a British submarine
- Transcription factor 3 (TCF3), a protein
- A version of the Mercedes-Benz M273 engine
