= E37 =

E37 or E-37 may refer to:

- HMS E37, a 1916 British E class submarine
- European route E37, a series of roads in Germany
- E37, a version of the Mercedes-Benz M112 engine
- Nerima-kasugachō Station or E-37, a Tokyo Toei Ōedo Line railway station
- Nimzo-Indian Defence or E37, a chess opening
- East–West Link Expressway and Kuala Lumpur–Seremban Expressway, route E37 in Malaysia
