= E21 =

E21 may refer to:

- BMW E21, an automobile platform
- HMS E21
- European route E21
- DRG series E 21, different locomotives of the German National Railroad
- E21 - Code that it designates the Astronomical observatory of Norm Roses, Leyburn
- E21 - code ECHO of the Nimzo-Indian Defence, opening of chess
- Eyeshield 21, a manga based on American football
- Economics21, or e21, web portal of the Manhattan Institute for Policy Research
- Kajang–Seremban Highway, route E21 in Malaysia
- The Lotus E21, a Formula One racing car
