= HMS E12 =

Submarine of the Royal Navy

History

United Kingdom
- Name: E12
- Builder: HM Dockyard, Chatham
- Cost: £101,900
- Laid down: 16 December 1912
- Launched: 5 September 1914
- Commissioned: 14 October 1914
- Fate: Sold, 7 March 1921

General characteristics
- Class & type: E-class submarine
- Displacement: 662 long tons (673 t) surfaced; 807 long tons (820 t) submerged
- Length: 181 ft (55 m)
- Beam: 15 ft (4.6 m)
- Propulsion: 2 × 800 hp (597 kW) diesels; 2 × 420 hp (313 kW) electric; 2 screws
- Speed: 15.25 knots (28.24 km/h; 17.55 mph) surfaced; 10.25 knots (18.98 km/h; 11.80 mph) submerged
- Range: 3,000 nmi (5,600 km) at 10 kn (19 km/h; 12 mph); 65 nmi (120 km) at 5 kn (9.3 km/h; 5.8 mph)
- Complement: 30
- Armament: 5 × 18 inch (450 mm) torpedo tubes (2 bow, 2 beam, 1 stern); 1 × 12-pounder gun

HMS E12 was a British E class submarine built by HM Dockyard, Chatham. She was laid down on 16 December 1912 and commissioned on 14 October 1914. Her construction costs totalled £101,900.

During the Great War, anti-submarine nets in the Dardanelles entangled her forward hydroplanes, forcing her down to a depth of 245 feet. At the time, this was the greatest depth achieved by any British submarine. E12 managed to surface only to come under fire by shore batteries, but avoided further damage. She survived the war and was sold for scrap in Malta on 7 March 1921.

== Design ==
Like all post-E8 British E-class submarines, E12 had a displacement of 662 long tons (673 t) at the surface and 807 long tons (820 t) while submerged. She had a total length of 180 feet (55 m) and a beam of 22 feet 8.5 inches (6.922 m). She was powered by two 800 horsepower (600 kW) Vickers eight-cylinder two-stroke diesel engines and two 420 horsepower (310 kW) electric motors. The submarine had a maximum surface speed of 16 knots (30 km/h; 18 mph) and a submerged speed of 10 knots (19 km/h; 12 mph). British E-class submarines had fuel capacities of 50 long tons (51 t) of diesel and ranges of 3,255 miles (5,238 km; 2,829 nmi) when travelling at 10 knots (19 km/h; 12 mph). E12 was capable of operating submerged for five hours when travelling at 5 knots (9.3 km/h; 5.8 mph).

E12 was armed with a single 4-inch QF gun mounted forward of the conning tower, and five 18 inch (450 mm) torpedo tubes, two in the bow, one either side amidships, and one in the stern; a total of 10 torpedoes were carried.

E-Class submarines had wireless systems with 1 kilowatt (1.3 hp) power ratings; in some submarines, these were later upgraded to 3 kilowatts (4.0 hp) systems by removing a midship torpedo tube. Their maximum design depth was 100 feet (30 m) although in service some reached depths of below 200 feet (61 m). Some submarines contained Fessenden oscillator systems.

== Crew ==
Her complement was three officers and 28 men.
