= E40 =

E40 may refer to:

- Nimzo-Indian Defense, Encyclopaedia of Chess Openings code
- European route E40, a road extending from France to Kazakhstan
- E-40 (born 1967), American rapper
- GE E40, a locomotive
- E40, the name for the fuel blend of 40% ethanol and 60% gasoline
- E40 screw, a type of Edison screw
- HMS E40, a 1916 British E class submarine
