= E53 =

E53 may refer to:

- BMW X5 (E53), the basis for the 1999 through 2006 BMW X5 Sports Activity Vehicle
- HMS E53, a British E class submarine
- European route E53, a road connecting Plzeň, Czech Republic and München, Germany
