= John Cashmore Ltd =

Welsh ship and locomotive scrapping company

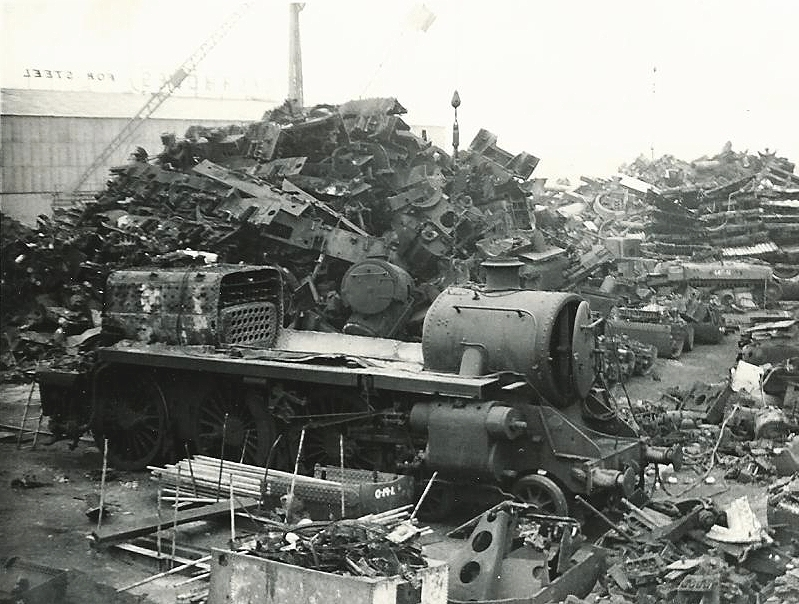
British Rail Riddles Standard Class 5MT 73116, being scrapped in 1967

John Cashmore Ltd (also known as J Cashmore, or simply as Cashmore's or other derivations) was a company operating largely in Newport, Monmouthshire, Wales. It became best known for ship breaking and scrapping redundant British railway locomotives.

== History ==
The company was founded in 1872 by a member of the Cashmore family in Horseley Heath, Staffordshire. While eventually the large part of the business was in Newport, with a business address at the Old Town Dock, the headquarters was in Great Bridge, Tipton. Scrapping of steam locomotives from the LMR, ER and WR, also took place at Gold's Hill, Great Bridge.

The shipbreaking business was closed in October 1976, and the remaining business was incorporated into the Glynwed Group.

== Ship breaking ==
It ran a ship breaking business on the banks of the River Usk, which had a very high tide enabling large vessels to be moved upstream. It scrapped many ex-Royal Navy ships including the following:

- HMS Bruizer (Destroyer - 1914)
- HMS Lurcher (Destroyer - 1922)
- HMS E27 (Submarine - 1922)
- HMS E33 (Submarine - 1922)
- HMS G5 (Submarine - 1922)
- HMS Nautilus (Submarine - 1922)
- HMS Inconstant (Light cruiser - 1922)
- HMS Undaunted (Light cruiser - 1923)
- HMS Gibraltar (1923)
- HMS Cordelia (Light Cruiser -1923)
- HMS Collingwood (Dreadnought battleship - 1923)
- HMS H21 (Submarine - 1926)
- HMS K2 (Submarine - 1926)
- HMS K6 (Submarine - 1926)
- HMS Cheltenham (1927)
- HMS Tower (Destroyer - 1928)
- HMS E48 (Submarine - 1928)
- HMS G4 (Submarine - 1928)
- HMS H30 (Submarine - 1935)
- HMS Caterham (Minesweeper - 1935)
- HMS Bryony (Sloop - 1938)
- HMS Unswerving (Submarine - 1946)
- HMS Trident (Submarine - 1946)
- HMS Enterprise (Light Cruiser - 1946)
- HMS Convolvulus (1947)
- HMS Cyclops (1947)
- HMS Colombo (1948)
- HMS Lookout (1948)
- HMS Delhi (1948)
- HMS Suffolk (1948)
- HMS Frobisher (1949)
- HMS Ajax (1949)
- HMS Arethusa (1950)
- HMS Leamington (1951)
- HMS Devonshire (1954)
- HMS Magicienne (1956)
- HMS Start Bay (1958)
- HMS Cleopatra (1958)
- HMS Cumberland (1958)
- HMS Zebra (1959)
- HMS Cockade (1964)
- HMS Orwell (1965)
- HMS Undine (1965)
- HMS Ursa (1967)
- HMS Carysfort (1970)
- HMS Troubridge (1970)
- HMS Acheron (Submarine - 1971).
- HMS Verulam (1972).

=== Civilian vessels ===
- MV Reina del Pacifico (1958)
- PS Cardiff Queen (1968)

== Contributions to railway preservation ==
Nearly all of the thousands of vehicles were scrapped after arriving. However, three steam locomotives were purchased for preservation; GWR 6400 Class No. 6430, now owned by the Dartmouth Steam Railway, is one of the more famous examples.

BR Standard Class 8 No. 71000 Duke of Gloucester, the sole member of its class withdrawn in 1962, was towed here in 1967 and nearly scrapped here. However, a former BR fireman named Maurice Sheppard realised that this locomotive was delivered to the wrong scrapyard. It was supposed to go to Woodham Brothers in South Wales. No. 71000 was transferred to Barry in October 1967, where it was exposed to the elements until being preserved in 1974. BR Standard Class 4 4-6-0 No. 75014 was also sent to Cashmore's with No. 71000 before being sent to Barry where it remained until 1981.
