= HMS E47 =

Submarine of the Royal Navy

History

United Kingdom
- Name: E47
- Builder: William Beardmore, Dalmuir
- Launched: 29 May 1916
- Commissioned: October 1916
- Fate: Lost, 20 August 1917

General characteristics
- Class & type: E-class submarine
- Displacement: 662 long tons (673 t) (surfaced); 807 long tons (820 t) (submerged)
- Length: 181 ft (55 m)
- Beam: 15 ft (4.6 m)
- Installed power: 1,600 hp (1,200 kW) (diesel engines); 840 hp (630 kW) (electric motors)
- Propulsion: 2 × 800 hp (600 kW) diesel engines; 2 × 420 hp (310 kW) electric motors; 2 × screws
- Speed: 15 kn (17 mph; 28 km/h) (surfaced); 10 kn (12 mph; 19 km/h) (submerged)
- Range: 3,000 nmi (3,500 mi; 5,600 km) at 10 kn (12 mph; 19 km/h) (surfaced); 65 nmi (75 mi; 120 km) at 5 kn (5.8 mph; 9.3 km/h) (surfaced)
- Complement: 31
- Armament: 5 × 18 inch (450 mm) torpedo tubes (2 bow, 2 beam, 1 stern), 1 × 12-pounder gun

HMS E47 was an E-class submarine launched by Fairfield, Govan for the Royal Navy and completed by William Beardmore, Dalmuir. She was launched on 29 May 1916 and was commissioned in October 1916.

== Design ==
Like all post-E8 British E-class submarines, E47 had a displacement of 662 long tons (673 t) at the surface and 807 long tons (820 t) while submerged. She had a total length of 180 feet (55 m) and a beam of 22 feet 8.5 inches (6.922 m). She was powered by two 800 horsepower (600 kW) Vickers eight-cylinder two-stroke diesel engines and two 420 horsepower (310 kW) electric motors. The submarine had a maximum surface speed of 16 knots (30 km/h; 18 mph) and a submerged speed of 10 knots (19 km/h; 12 mph). British E-class submarines had fuel capacities of 50 long tons (51 t) of diesel and ranges of 3,255 miles (5,238 km; 2,829 nmi) when travelling at 10 knots (19 km/h; 12 mph). E47 was capable of operating submerged for five hours when travelling at 5 knots (9.3 km/h; 5.8 mph).

E47 was armed with a 12-pounder 76 mm (3.0 in) QF gun mounted forward of the conning tower. She had five 18 inch (450 mm) torpedo tubes, two in the bow, one either side amidships, and one in the stern; a total of 10 torpedoes were carried.

E-Class submarines had wireless systems with 1 kilowatt (1.3 hp) power ratings; in some submarines, these were later upgraded to 3 kilowatts (4.0 hp) systems by removing a midship torpedo tube. Their maximum design depth was 100 feet (30 m) although in service some reached depths of below 200 feet (61 m). Some submarines contained Fessenden oscillator systems.

== Service history ==
E47 was based at Harwich with the 9th Flotilla - depot ships Maidstone and Forth. She was engaged in North Sea patrols off the German and Dutch coasts. Following the resumption of German coastal shipping between Heligoland Bight and Rotterdam, four E-class submarines were sent to intercept. E47 was lost in the North Sea on 20 August 1917. There were no survivors.

== Wreck of E47 ==
The wreck of E47, found in 2002 by Divingteam Noordkaap from Vlieland, lies about 6 nmi (6.9 mi; 11 km) northwest of Texel. The deck gun, which was torn off its mounting, probably by a trawler, and was lying beside the wreck, has been salvaged and identifies the wreck.

The wreck bears the Dutch Hydrographic Department wreck number 927, and lies in position 53°6′8.10″N 4°33′28.0″E.

== Casualties ==
Among the men lost in the sinking of E47 was Lieut. Colin Fraser Creswell, the son of Vice Admiral Sir William Rooke Creswell KCMG, KBE, RAN.
