= British E-class submarine =

Type of British submarines in service during WWI

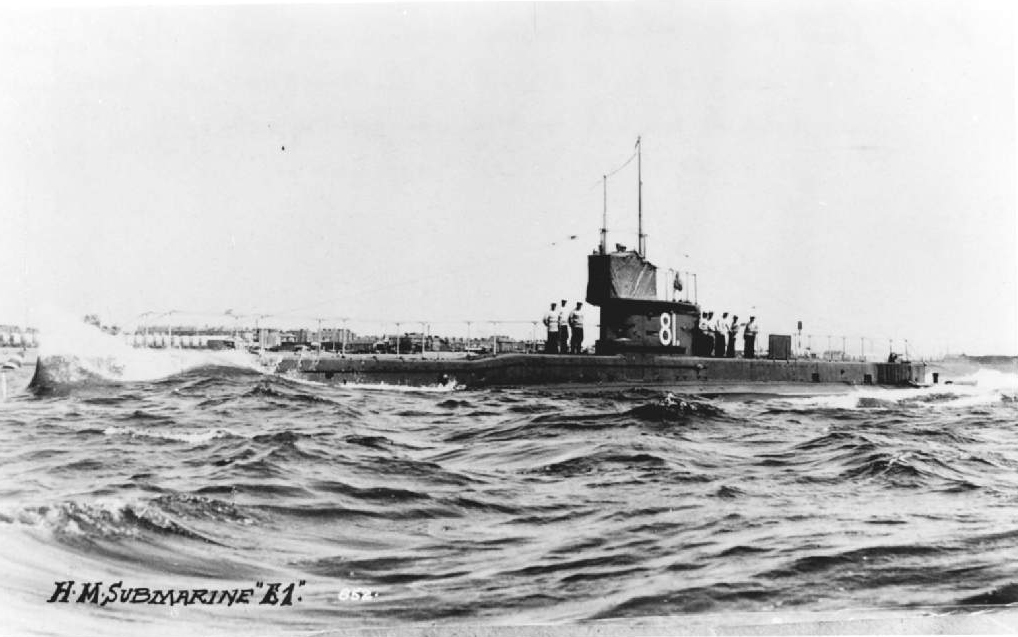
- HMS E1

Class overview
- Builders: Vickers, Barrow; HM Dockyard, Chatham; William Beardmore, Dalmuir; Yarrow, Scotstoun; Scotts, Greenock; Fairfield, Govan, Clyde; Swan Hunter, Wallsend; Cammell Laird, Birkenhead; William Denny, Dumbarton; John Brown, Clydebank; John Thornycroft, Woolston, Hampshire; Armstrong Whitworth, Newcastle upon Tyne
- Operators: Royal Navy; Royal Australian Navy
- Preceded by: D class
- Succeeded by: L class
- Completed: 58
- Preserved: 0 (The conning towers of HMS E17, E50 and E24 are preserved at three separate locations.)

General characteristics
- Type: Submarine
- Displacement: Group 1: Surfaced: 665 tons; Submerged: 796 tons; Group 2: Surfaced: 667 tons; Submerged: 807 tons; Group 3: Surfaced: 662 tons; Submerged: 807 tons; Australian boats: Surfaced: 664 tons; Submerged: 780 tons
- Length: Group 1: 178 ft (54 m); Group 2+3: 181 ft (55 m); Australian boats: 176 ft (54 m)
- Beam: All groups: 15.05 ft (4.59 m)
- Propulsion: Group 1 + Australian boats: 2 × 800 hp (600 kW) Vickers diesel; 2 × 600 hp (450 kW) electric; 2 screws; Group 2+3: 2 × 800 hp Vickers diesel; 2 × 840 hp (630 kW) electric; 2 screws
- Speed: Group 1: Surfaced: 15 knots (28 km/h; 17 mph); Submerged: 9.5 knots (17.6 km/h; 10.9 mph); Group 2: Surfaced: 15.25 knots (28.24 km/h; 17.55 mph); Submerged: 10.25 knots (18.98 km/h; 11.80 mph); Group 3 and Australian boats: Surfaced: 15 knots; Submerged: 10 knots (19 km/h; 12 mph)
- Range: All groups: Surfaced: 3,000 nmi (5,600 km; 3,500 mi) at 10 knots; Submerged: 65 nmi (120 km; 75 mi) at 5 knots (9.3 km/h; 5.8 mph)
- Complement: All groups: 30
- Armament: Group 1: 4 × 18-inch (450 mm) torpedo tubes (1 bow, 2 beam, 1 stern); Group 2 + 3: 5 × 18 in tubes (2 bow, 2 beam, 1 stern); 1 × 12-pounder gun; Australian boats: 4 × 18 in tubes (1 bow, 2 beam, 1 stern)

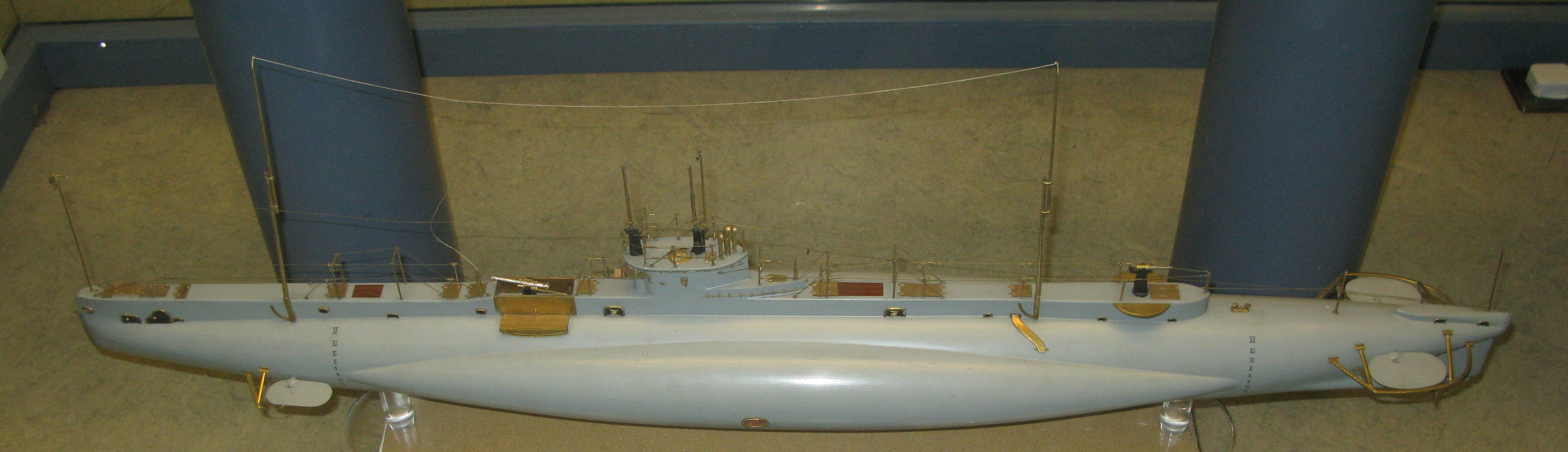
Model of an E-class submarine

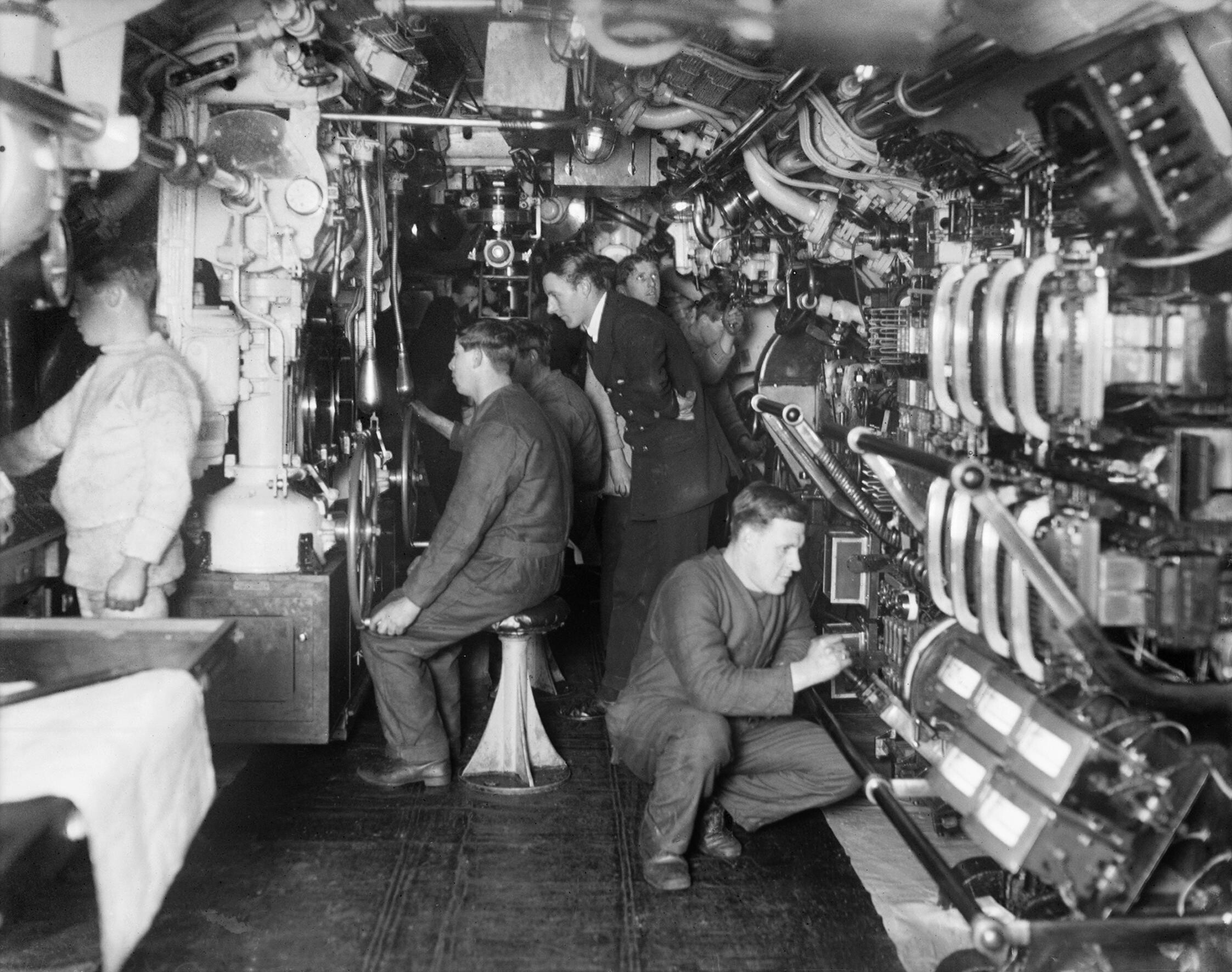
Interior of an E-class submarine, possibly E34

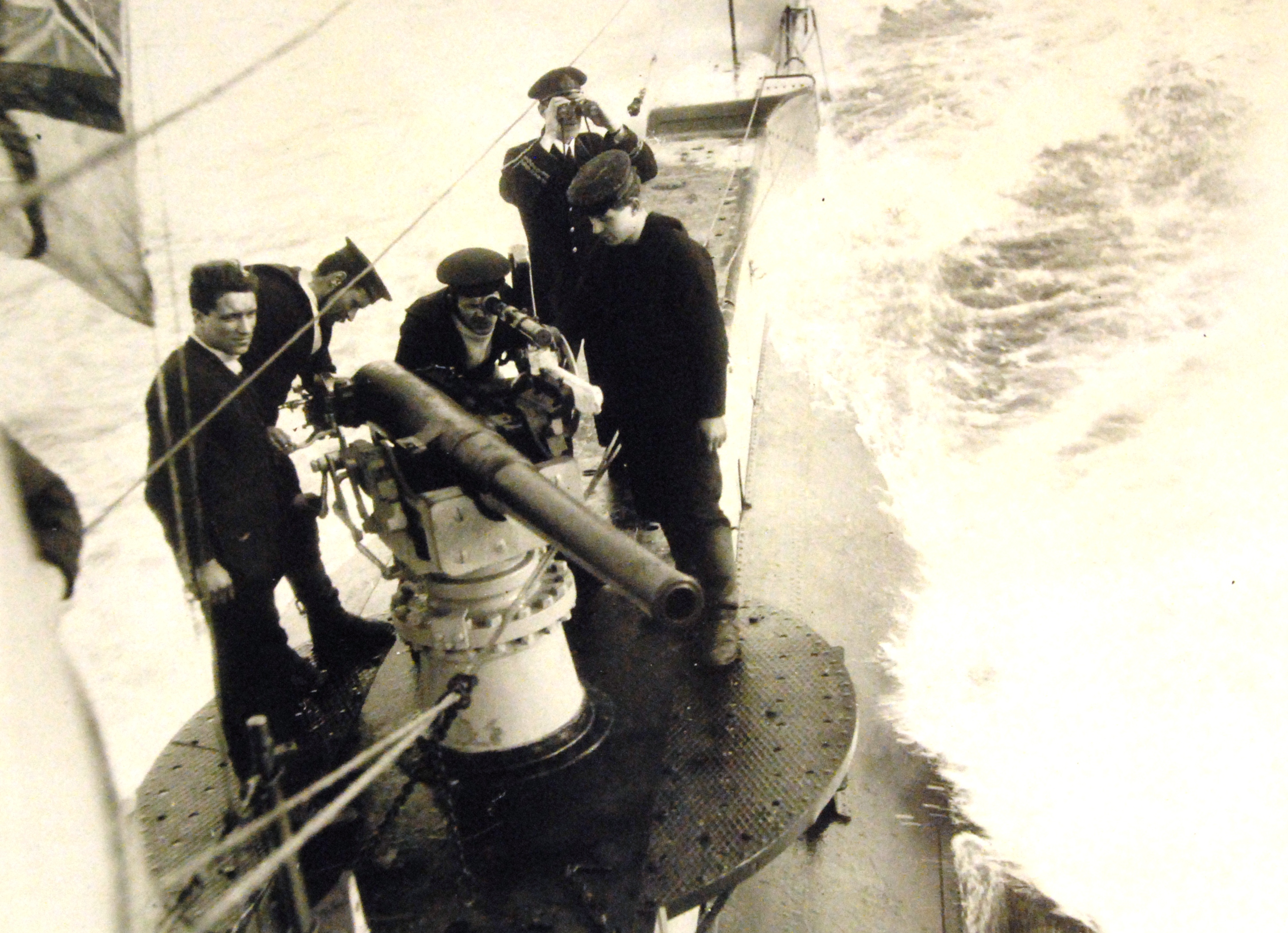
12-pounder gun of an E-class submarine

The British E-class submarines started out as improved versions of the British D-class submarine. The E class served with the Royal Navy throughout World War I as the backbone of the submarine fleet. The last surviving E class submarines were withdrawn from service by 1922.

All of the first group and some of the second group of the class were completed before the outbreak of World War I. The group 1 boats cost £101,900 per hull. As submarine technology improved, the E class went through several design modifications. The group 2 boats cost £105,700 per hull. The group 3 boats, the last group, incorporated all improvements.

The class primarily served in the North Sea and the Baltic, while some served with Russian ships in Russian coastal waters before their crews scuttled the submarines to avoid them falling into the hands of the Germans after the Treaty of Brest-Litovsk ended fighting between Germany and Russia. Additionally, some of the submarines operated against the Turks.

The British L-class submarine eventually replaced the E class.

== Boats ==
- Group 1
  - E1 – Launched 9 November 1912. Scuttled by her crew on 3 April 1918.
  - E2 – Launched 23 November 1912. Sold on 7 March 1921.
  - E3 – Launched 29 October 1912. Torpedoed by U-27 on 18 October 1914.
  - E4 – Launched 5 February 1912. Sold for scrap on 21 February 1922
  - E5 – Launched 17 May 1912. Mined & sunk in the North Sea, 7 March 1916.
  - E6 – Launched 12 November 1912. Mined on 26 December 1915.
  - E7 – Launched 2 October 1913. Scuttled on 4 September 1915.
  - E8 – Launched 30 October 1913.
  - AE1 – Built for the RAN. Lost near Papua New Guinea, 14 September 1914.
  - AE2 – Built for the RAN. Scuttled on 28 April 1915, in the Sea of Marmara during the Battle of Gallipoli.
- Group 2
  - E9 – Launched 29 November 1913. Part of the British submarine flotilla in the Baltic.
  - E10 – Launched 29 November 1913. Lost 18 January 1915.
  - E11 – Launched 23 April 1914.
  - E12 – Launched 5 September 1914.
  - E13 – Launched 22 September 1914. Ran aground and interned by the Danes.
  - E14 – Launched 7 July 1914. 27 January 1918, Sunk by coastal battery fire. Nine survivors.
  - E15 – Launched 23 April 1914. Destroyed on 19 April 1915 in the Dardanelles.
  - E16 – Launched 23 September 1914.
  - E17 – Launched 16 January 1915. Conning tower preserved at the Royal Navy Submarine Museum in Gosport United Kingdom.
  - E18 – Launched 4 March 1915. Mined & sunk in the Baltic Sea close to the Estonian island of Hiiumaa, possibly on 2 June 1916.
  - E19 – Launched 13 May 1915.
  - E20 – Launched 12 June 1915. Torpedoed by a German U-boat on 5 November 1915 in the Sea of Marmara.
- Group 3
  - E21 – Launched 24 July 1915.
  - E22 – Launched 27 August 1915. In 1916 fitted as aircraft carrier for two Sopwith Baby floatplanes. Torpedoed and sunk in North Sea off Great Yarmouth while on surface by German U-boat, 25 April 1916.
  - E23 – Launched 28 September 1915.
  - E24 – Launched 9 December 1915. Minelayer. Conning preserved at a museum in Cuxhaven.
  - E25 – Launched 23 August 1915.
  - E26 – Launched 11 November 1915. Lost on 6 July 1916.
  - E27 – Launched 9 June 1917.
  - HMS E28 was cancelled on 20 April 1915.
  - E29 – Launched 1 June 1915.
  - E30 – Launched 29 June 1915. Lost on 22 November 1916.
  - E31 – Launched 23 August 1915.
  - E32 – Launched 16 August 1916.
  - E33 – Launched 18 April 1916.
  - E34 – Launched 27 January 1917. Minelayer. Mined off the Frisian Islands 20 July 1918.
  - E35 – Launched 20 May 1916.
  - E36 – Launched 16 September 1916. Lost on 17 January 1917.
  - E37 – Launched 2 September 1915. Lost on 1 December 1916.
  - E38 – Launched 13 June 1916.
  - E39 – Launched 18 May 1916.
  - E40 – Launched 9 November 1916.
  - E41 – Launched 22 October 1915. Minelayer.
  - E42 – Launched 22 October 1915.
  - E43 – Launched 11 November 1915.
  - E44 – Launched 21 February 1916.
  - E45 – Launched 25 January 1916. Minelayer.
  - E46 – Launched 4 April 1916. Minelayer.
  - E47 – Launched 29 May 1916. Lost on 20 August 1917.
  - E48 – Launched 2 August 1916.
  - E49 – Launched 18 September 1916. Mined & sunk near Huney in the Shetland Islands, 12 March 1917.
  - E50 – Launched 13 November 1916. Mined & sunk, 1 February 1918. Conning tower preserved at the Sea War Museum Jutland in Thyborøn, Denmark.
  - E51 – Launched 30 November 1916. Minelayer.
  - E52 – Launched 25 January 1917.
  - E53 – Launched in 1916.
  - E54 – Launched in 1916.
  - E55 – Launched 5 February 1916.
  - E56 – Launched 19 June 1916.
