= HMS E40 =

Submarine of the Royal Navy

History

United Kingdom
- Name: E40
- Builder: Armstrong Whitworth, Newcastle upon Tyne
- Launched: 9 November 1916
- Commissioned: May 1917
- Fate: Sold, 14 December 1921

General characteristics
- Class & type: E-class submarine
- Displacement: 662 long tons (673 t) surfaced; 807 long tons (820 t) submerged
- Length: 181 ft (55 m)
- Beam: 15 ft (4.6 m)
- Propulsion: 2 × 800 hp (597 kW) diesel; 2 × 420 hp (313 kW) electric; 2 screws
- Speed: 15 knots (28 km/h; 17 mph) surfaced; 10 knots (19 km/h; 12 mph) submerged
- Range: 3,000 nmi (5,600 km) at 10 kn (19 km/h; 12 mph) surfaced; 65 nmi (120 km) at 5 kn (9.3 km/h; 5.8 mph) surfaced
- Complement: 31
- Armament: 5 × 18 inch (450 mm) torpedo tubes (2 bow, 2 beam, 1 stern); 1 × 12-pounder gun

HMS E40 was a British E-class submarine launched by Palmer, Jarrow in 1916 and was completed by Armstrong Whitworth, Newcastle upon Tyne. She was launched on 9 November 1916 and was commissioned in May 1917.

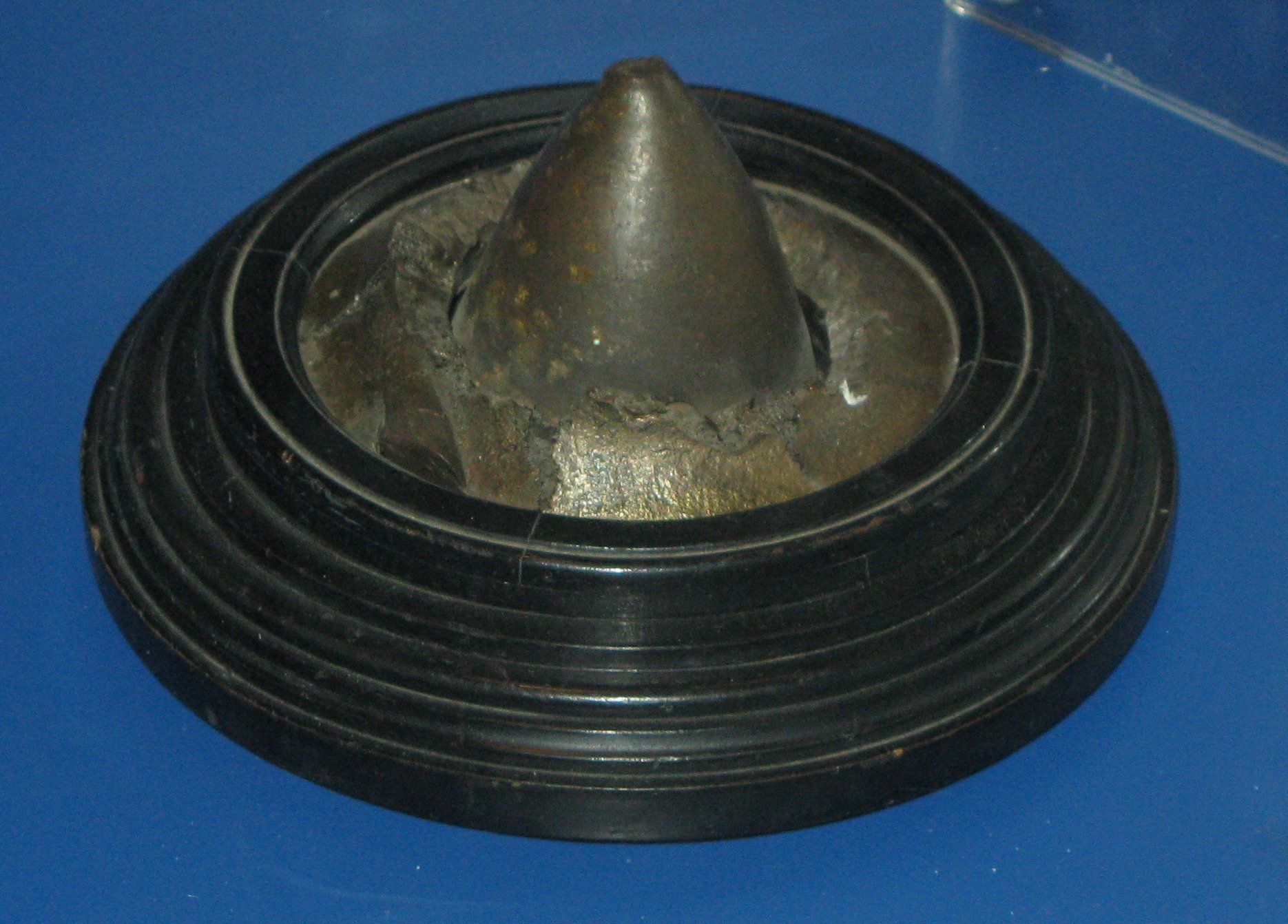
The shell that embedded itself in the conning tower of HMS E40 causing the submarine to dive to 330 feet.

During her World War I service while patrolling Scandinavian waters E40 encountered a U-boat. As the submarine dived the captain was hit with shrapnel and had to be dragged in; the hatch stuck and the vessel took on water, going straight to the bottom. After an hour the air was poor; with the captain unconscious, the first lieutenant asked the crew if he could use the remaining oxygen to try to raise the submarine. This succeeded and the E40 managed to get back to Middlesbrough where it had been posted missing, presumed sunk. The captain survived. HMS E40 was sold on 14 December 1921.

== Design ==
Like all post-E8 British E-class submarines, E40 had a displacement of 662 long tons (673 t) at the surface and 807 long tons (820 t) while submerged. She had a total length of 180 feet (55 m) and a beam of 22 feet 8.5 inches (6.922 m). She was powered by two 800 horsepower (600 kW) Vickers eight-cylinder two-stroke diesel engines and two 420 horsepower (310 kW) electric motors. The submarine had a maximum surface speed of 16 knots (30 km/h; 18 mph) and a submerged speed of 10 knots (19 km/h; 12 mph). British E-class submarines had fuel capacities of 50 long tons (51 t) of diesel and ranges of 3,255 miles (5,238 km; 2,829 nmi) when travelling at 10 knots (19 km/h; 12 mph). E40 was capable of operating submerged for five hours when travelling at 5 knots (9.3 km/h; 5.8 mph).

E40 was armed with a 12-pounder 76 mm (3.0 in) QF gun mounted forward of the conning tower. She had five 18 inch (450 mm) torpedo tubes, two in the bow, one either side amidships, and one in the stern; a total of 10 torpedoes were carried.

E-class submarines had wireless systems with 1 kilowatt (1.3 hp) power ratings; in some submarines, these were later upgraded to 3 kilowatts (4.0 hp) systems by removing a midship torpedo tube. Their maximum design depth was 100 feet (30 m) although in service some reached depths of below 200 feet (61 m). Some submarines contained Fessenden oscillator systems.

== Crew ==
Her complement was three officers and 28 men.
