= HMS Tower (1917) =

Destroyer of the Royal Navy

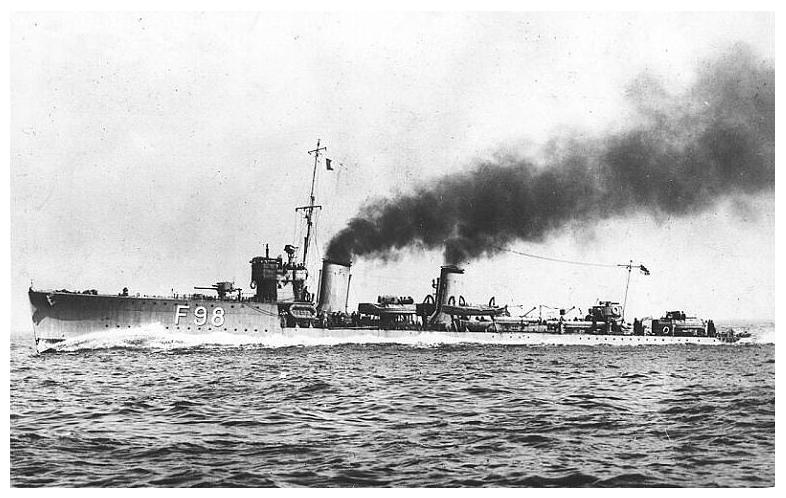
- Tower during sea trials

History

United Kingdom
- Name: HMS Tower
- Namesake: White Tower, Tower of London
- Builder: Swan Hunter
- Laid down: September 1916
- Launched: 5 April 1917
- Decommissioned: 17 May 1928
- Motto: "God save King George and his Tower"
- Fate: Sold for scrapping 1928

General characteristics
- Class & type: R-class destroyer
- Displacement: 975 long tons (991 t) standard; 1,035 long tons (1,052 t) built by Thornycroft; 930 long tons (940 t) built by Yarrow
- Length: 276 ft (84.1 m)
- Beam: 26 ft 9 in (8.15 m)
- Draught: 9 ft 10 in (3.00 m)
- Propulsion: 3 boilers; 2 geared Brown Curtis steam turbines, 27,000 shp
- Speed: 36 knots (41.4 mph; 66.7 km/h)
- Range: 3,440 nmi (6,370 km) at 15 kn (28 km/h)
- Complement: 82
- Armament: 3 × QF 4-inch (101.6 mm) Mark IV guns, mounting P Mk. IX; 1 × single 2-pounder (40-mm) "pom-pom" Mk. II anti-aircraft gun; 4 × 21 in (533 mm) torpedo tubes (2×2)

HMS Tower was a modified R-class destroyer of the Royal Navy, named after the White Tower of the Tower of London. She was built by Swan Hunter, and launched on 5 April 1917. She is noted for having the first modern Royal Navy ship's badge. She served as part of the Grand Fleet and Harwich Force.

She held the pennant number of F24 from January 1918 until she was sold in 1928. Prior to this the pennant number of F24 was held by HMS Rival for one year from January 1917 onwards.

== Ship's badge ==
Prior to 1917 there was no standard design for a ship's badge. The first modern ship's badge was designed by Mr George Richardson; Director of the Swan Hunter shipyard on the Tees; and Major Charles ffoulkes; the curator of the government endorsed museum for the collection of artefacts of war.

The Commanding Officer of Tower asked Richardson if he could offer a design for the badge for his ship. Richardson spoke to ffoulkes and together they came up with a design that showed the White Tower of the Tower of London, with the motto "God save King George and his Tower". This was encased in a circular rope frame, with a Naval Crown at the top, along with the name "Tower" set into a rectangular panel at the bottom. This design set the standard for all future ship's badges and became the design from which all today's badges are derived. Major ffoulkes was subsequently requested to design others and the Admiralty Board set up a Ships' Badges Committee in 1918 to regulate ships' badges with him as the first Adviser on Heraldry.

Tower was sold for scrap on 17 May 1928 and subsequently broken up by John Cashmore Ltd at Newport.

== Bibliography ==
- Colledge, J. J.; Warlow, Ben (2006) [1969]. Ships of the Royal Navy: The Complete Record of All Fighting Ships of the Royal Navy from the 15th Century to the Present (3rd Rev ed.). London: Chatham Publishing. ISBN 978-1-86176-281-8. OCLC 67375475.
- Friedman, Norman (2009). British Destroyers: From Earliest Days to the Second World War. Barnsley, UK: Seaforth Publishing. ISBN 978-1-84832-049-9.
- Gardiner, Robert & Gray, Randal, eds. (1985). Conway's All The World's Fighting Ships 1906–1921. London: Conway Maritime Press. ISBN 0-85177-245-5.
- March, Edgar J. (1966). British Destroyers: A History of Development, 1892–1953; Drawn by Admiralty Permission From Official Records & Returns, Ships' Covers & Building Plans. London: Seeley Service. OCLC 164893555.
