= Fessenden oscillator =

Type of electro-acoustic transducer

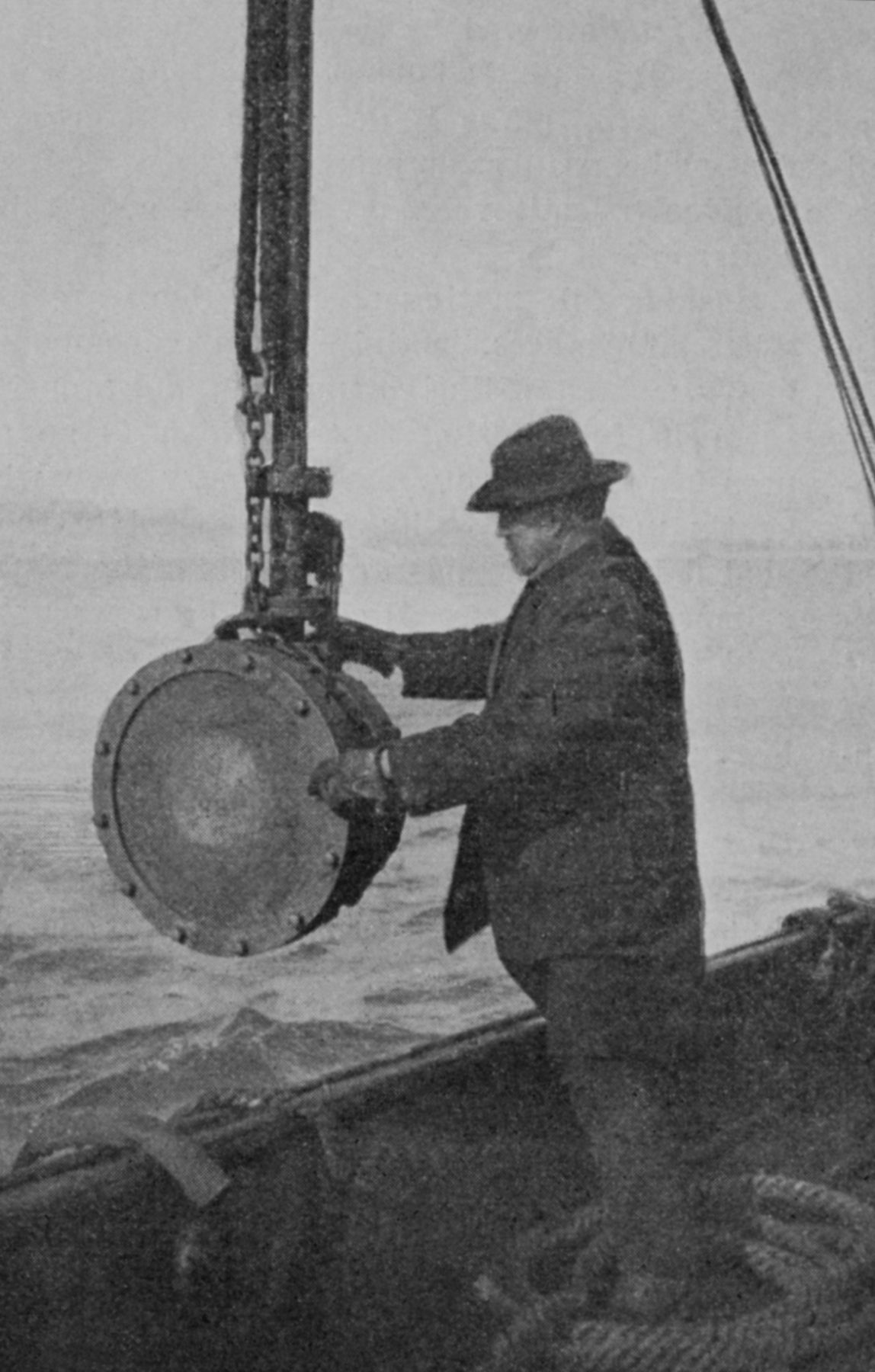
Reginald Fessenden and Fessenden oscillator, around 1914

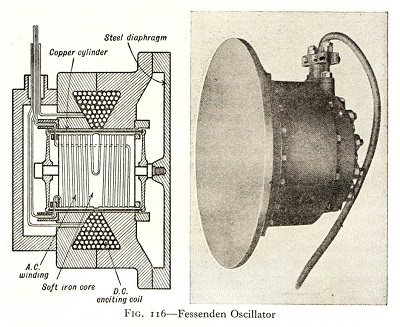
Design and photograph of a Fessenden oscillator, with copper cylinder, soft iron core, AC winding, DC coil and 1.9 cm thick steel diaphragm

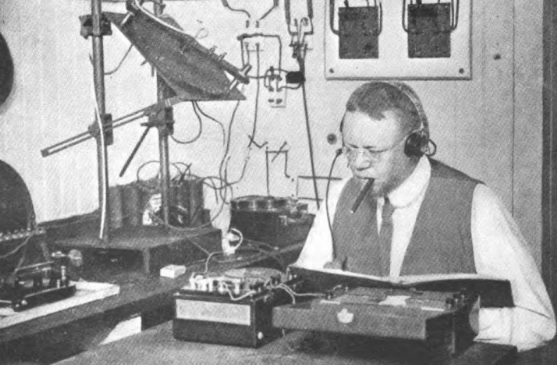
Fessenden operating oscillator in 1915.

A Fessenden oscillator is an electro-acoustic transducer invented by Reginald Fessenden, with development starting in 1912 at the Submarine Signal Company of Boston. It was the first successful acoustical echo ranging device. Similar in operating principle to a dynamic voice coil loudspeaker, it was an early kind of transducer, capable of creating underwater sounds and of picking up their echoes.

The creation of this device was motivated by the RMS Titanic disaster of 1912, which highlighted the need to protect ships from collisions with icebergs, obstacles, and other ships. Because of its relatively low operating frequency, it has been replaced in modern transducers by piezoelectric devices.

== Oscillator ==
The oscillator in the name referred to the fact that the device vibrated and moved water in response to a driving AC current. It was not an electronic oscillator but a mechanical one in that it generated repetitive mechanical vibrations. Electronic oscillators did not yet exist when this device was created. Because the design of the device does not depend on a resonant response, it should not be considered a harmonic oscillator.

== Operation ==
The Fessenden oscillator somewhat resembled a modern dynamic microphone or dynamic loudspeaker in overall construction. A circular metal plate, clamped at its edge, in contact with the water on one side, was attached on the other side to a copper tube, which was free to move in the circular gap of a magnet system. The magnet system had a direct-current winding to provide a polarizing magnetic field in the gap, and an alternating current winding that induced currents in the copper tube. These induced currents produced a magnetic field that reacted against the polarizing field. The resulting force was communicated to the membrane and in turn provided acoustic vibrations into the water.

Unlike previous underwater sound sources such as underwater bells, the Fessenden oscillator was reversible; the AC winding could be connected to a head set and underwater sounds and echoes could be heard. Using this device Fessenden was able to detect icebergs at a distance of about 2 nautical miles (3.7 km; 2.3 mi), and occasionally detected echoes from the sea floor.

The device could also be used as an underwater telegraph, sending Morse code through the water. The Fessenden underwater signalling apparatus, or more usually just "The Fessenden", was fitted to Royal Navy submarines in World War I. British K-series submarines were equipped with Fessenden oscillators starting in 1915. However, a submarine signalling the surface could be heard by any nearby (enemy) hydrophone, so the system had restricted utility during wartime patrols.

== Application ==
During the First World War the Fessenden oscillator was applied to detection of submarines, but its rather low operating frequency of around 1 kilohertz gave it a very broad beam, unsuitable for detecting and localising small targets. In peacetime, the oscillator was used for depth finding, where the lack of directionality was not a concern, and Fessenden designed a commercial fathometer using a carbon microphone as receiver, for the Submarine Signal Company.

== See also ==
- Submarine signals – Marine hazard signaling system
- Underwater acoustics – Study of the propagation of sound in water
- Underwater acoustic communication – Wireless technique of sending and receiving messages through water
- Hydrophone – Underwater microphone
- List of Reginald Fessenden patents

== Bibliography ==
- Frost, Gary Lewis (2001). "Inventing Schemes and Strategies: The Making and Selling of the Fessenden Oscillator". Technology and Culture. 42 (3): 462–488. doi:10.1353/tech.2001.0109. S2CID 110194817. Project MUSE 33762.
