= Derbyshire County Cricket Club in 1920 =

1920 season of an English cricket team

Derbyshire County Cricket Club seasons
1920 season
- Captain: John Chapman
- County Championship: 16
- Most runs: Leonard Oliver
- Most wickets: Arthur Morton
- Most catches: Harry Elliott

Derbyshire County Cricket Club in 1920 was the English cricket club Derbyshire's fiftieth season. It was the club's twenty-second season in the County Championship and the most disastrous season ever experienced by any side since the County Championship was established. Derbyshire lost 17 of the 18 matches played and the other was abandoned without a ball being bowled.

== 1920 season ==
John Chapman was captain for the season, having held the post twice before World War I. The team was very unstable. Thirty eight players played for Derbyshire in the season, but only six played in more than half the matches. The club suffered from the absence of devastating bowler Billy Bestwick for all but one match, in which he took seven wickets, while other players such as Thomas Forrester and Arnold Warren were drawing to the end of their career. Leonard Oliver was top scorer and Arthur Morton with 89 wickets did the bulk of the bowling with Samuel Cadman. Oliver and Morton were the only players to score centuries.

Fifteen players made their debut in the season, half of them playing three or fewer matches. The most significant additions to the side were Harry Storer and wicket keeper Harry Elliott both of whom had long careers with the club and were members of the 1936 championship winning team. Newcomers Wilfred Carter, Jim Hutchinson, William Tomlinson, Anthony Jackson and Robert Bestwick played in several subsequent seasons. Those who only appeared in 1920 were Henry Radford, Kenneth Dobson and Douglas Linathan with three appearances, Albert Woodland and Allen Turner with two appearances and Geoffrey Brooke-Taylor, Timothy Boden and John Davis who only played one game each.

=== Matches ===
List of matches
No.	Date	V	Result	Margin	Notes
1	15 May 1920	Yorkshire; Bramall Lane, Sheffield	Lost	Innings and 223 runs	Kilner 206*
2	19 May 1920	Lancashire; Queen's Park, Chesterfield	Lost	Innings and 160 runs	Makepeace 132; A Morton 6-73; Cook 7-8
3	22 May 1920	Warwickshire; County Ground, Derby	Lost	8 wickets	Howell 6-25 and 6-39; A Morton 5-44; SWA Cadman 5-36
4	12 Jun 1920	Essex; County Ground, Derby	Lost	6 wickets	Douglas 8-39; A Morton 5-94; Reeves 5-61
5	19 Jun 1920	Northamptonshire; Queen's Park, Chesterfield	Lost	114 runs	A Morton 5-61 and 6-35; Murdin 5-29 and 6-39
6	23 Jun 1920	Lancashire; Old Trafford, Manchester	Lost	Innings and 228 runs	Tyldesley 169 and 5-40; Cook 5-50; Dean 5-26
7	03 Jul 1920	Nottinghamshire; Queen's Park, Chesterfield	Abandoned		
8	07 Jul 1920	Leicestershire; Aylestone Road, Leicester	Lost	6 wickets	King 8-61 and 5-41;W Bestwick 5-41; A Morton 5-33
9	10 Jul 1920	Yorkshire; County Ground, Derby	Lost	Innings and 71 runs	Holmes 104; Robinson 5-20; Rhodes 7-24
10	14 Jul 1920	Sussex; County Ground, Hove	Lost	134 runs	A Morton 6-60; Cox 7-8
11	17 Jul 1920	Somerset; County Ground, Derby	Lost	5 wickets	A Morton 8-37; Robson 6-20
12	24 Jul 1920	Northamptonshire; County Ground, Northampton	Lost	80 runs	SWA Cadman 6-34 and 8-70; Wells 6-54
13	31 Jul 1920	Warwickshire; Edgbaston, Birmingham	Lost	220 runs	SWA Cadman 5-55; Howell 7-45
14	07 Aug 1920	Sussex; Queen's Park, Chesterfield	Lost	Innings and 108 runs	WJV Tomlinson 5-53
15	11 Aug 1920	Leicestershire; County Ground, Derby	Lost	Innings and 14 runs	A Morton 105; Astill 5-24
16	14 Aug 1920	Essex; Southchurch Park, Southend-on-Sea	Lost	104 runs	A Morton 5-57; Louden 8-36
17	26 Aug 1920	Nottinghamshire; Trent Bridge, Nottingham	Lost	197 runs	Whysall 142; L Oliver 170; Gunn 123
18	01 Sep 1920	Somerset; Clarence Park, Weston-super-Mare	Lost	10 wickets	Daniell 102; White 7-33 and 5-46

== Statistics ==
=== County Championship batting averages ===
Name	Matches	Inns	Runs	High score	Average	100s
HW Smith	1	2	34	24*	34.00	0
L Oliver	12	24	546	170	22.75	1
GP Brooke-Taylor	1	2	44	30	22.00	0
SWA Cadman	17	34	528	47	16.00	0
H Elliott	14	28	299	42*	15.73	0
CJ Corbett	4	8	109	61	15.57	0
A Morton	17	34	481	105*	15.51	1
A Warren	2	4	30	21*	15.00	0
W Carter	9	18	229	35	12.72	0
FG Peach	8	16	186	61*	12.40	0
WN Malthouse	4	8	68	26*	9.71	0
JM Hutchinson	5	10	93	44	9.30	0
GF Bell	3	6	50	20	8.33	0
AW Woodland	2	4	27	19*	9.00	0
H Wild	8	16	135	26	8.43	0
J Chapman	14	27	191	27	7.95	0
A Severn	3	6	47	33	7.83	0
JD Southern	2	4	30	20	7.50	0
TW Boden	1	2	14	9	7.00	0
DV Linathan	3	6	35	14*	7.00	0
H Storer	12	24	147	32	6.68	0
WJV Tomlinson	5	10	58	15	6.44	0
LE Flint	1	2	12	6	6.00	0
SM Holden	1	2	6	6*	6.00	0
G Beet	6	12	69	19	5.75	0
HW Radford	3	6	23	14	5.75	0
GR Jackson	9	18	92	14	5.11	0
TF Revill	1	2	10	5	5.00	0
FA Barber	2	4	19	8	4.75	0
CF Root	1	2	9	7	4.50	0
JW Davis	1	2	9	8	4.50	0
T Forrester	2	2	6	6	3.00	0
W Bestwick	1	2	6	5*	3.00	0
RS Bestwick	2	4	9	6	2.25	0
AHM Jackson	2	4	7	5	1.75	0
KWC Dobson	3	6	6	3	1.50	0
J Horsley	1	2	2	2	1.00	0
W Reader-Blackton	2	4	4	1	1.00	0
A Turner	2	4	4	2	1.00	0

=== County Championship bowling averages ===
Name	Balls	Runs	Wickets	BB	Average
A Morton	4611	1808	89	8-37	20.31
SWA Cadman	3321	1211	58	8-70	20.87
WJV Tomlinson	622	272	14	5-53	19.42
H Storer	642	350	10	3-23	35.00
A Warren	288	141	9	4-45	15.66
W Bestwick	318	97	7	5-41	13.85
A Turner	252	138	6	3-66	23.00
FA Barber	318	117	5	2-30	23.40
FG Peach	210	149	4	3-50	37.25
HW Radford	186	86	4	2-18	21.50
SM Holden	132	72	3	3-72	24.00
T Forrester	306	161	2	2-116	80.50
KWC Dobson	132	99	1	1-25	99.00
JM Hutchinson	138	81	1	1-35	81.00
DV Linathan	102	78	1	1-15	78.00
W Reader-Blackton	18	7	1	1-7	7.00
LE Flint	102	74	1	1-74	74.00
RS Bestwick	126	55	0		
J Chapman	18	12	0		
J Horsley	48	31	0		
AHM Jackson	132	93	0		
WN Malthouse	114	69	0		
L Oliver	12	8	0		
CF Root	36	17	0		
H Wild	6	11	0		
AW Woodland	90	69	0		

=== Wicket Keeping ===
- George Beet - Catches 6, Stumping 2
- H Elliott - Catches 17, Stumping 9

== See also ==
- Derbyshire County Cricket Club seasons
- 1920 English cricket season
- Imperfect season
