= Quaife (surname) =

Quaife is a surname. Notable people with the surname include:

- Adrian Quaife-Hobbs (born 1991), British racing driver
- Alan Quaife (1945–2019), Australian rules footballer
- Barzillai Quaife (1798–1873), British-born editor
- Bernard Quaife (1899–1984), English cricketer
- Darlene Quaife (born 1948), Canadian novelist
- Frank Quaife (1905–1968), English cricketer
- Geoffrey Robert Quaife, Australian social historian
- John Quaife (born 1955), retired senior officer of the Royal Australian Air Force
- Milo Quaife (1880–1959), American historian
- Phil Quaife (born 1986), British racing driver
- Pete Quaife (1943–2010), English musician, artist and author
- Walter Quaife (1864–1943), English cricketer
- Willie Quaife (1872–1951), English cricketer
