= HMS Surprise (1916) =

Destroyer of the Royal Navy

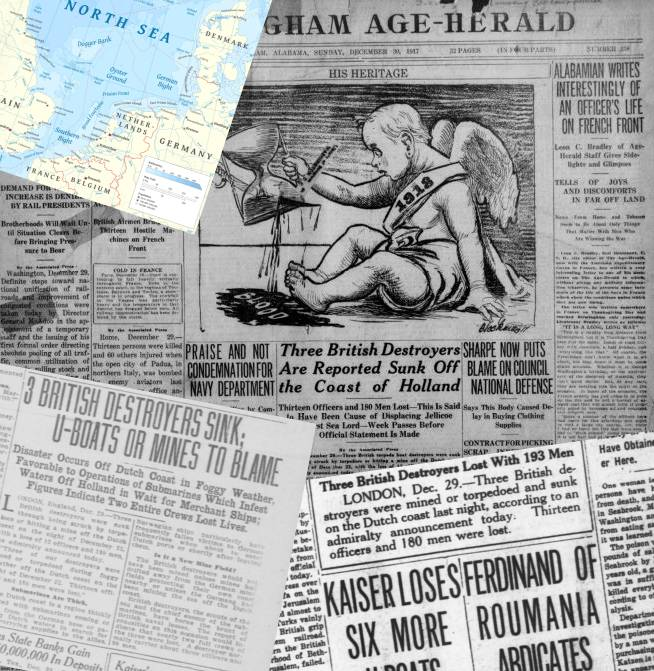
- US media coverage of the Sinking of HMS Surprise, Torrent, Tornado

History

United Kingdom
- Name: HMS Surprise
- Builder: Yarrow Shipbuilders, Glasgow
- Launched: 25 November 1916
- Completed: February 1917
- Fate: Mined and sunk 23 December 1917

General characteristics
- Class & type: R-class destroyer
- Displacement: 975 long tons (991 t)
- Length: 273 ft (83.2 m)
- Beam: 25 ft 7 1/2 in (7.81 m)
- Draught: 9 ft (2.7 m)
- Propulsion: 3 boilers; 2 direct drive Parsons steam turbines, 27,000 shp (20,000 kW)
- Speed: 36 knots (41.4 mph; 66.7 km/h)
- Complement: 82
- Armament: 3 × QF 4 inch Mark IV guns; 1 × single 2-pounder (40-mm) "pom-pom" Mk. II anti-aircraft gun; 4 × 21 in (533 mm) torpedo tubes (2×2)

HMS Surprise was a Royal Navy R-class destroyer constructed and then operational in the First World War. She was sunk, with most of her crew in 1917. On 23 December 1917 HMS Surprise, Torrent, and Tornado sank after entering an Imperial German minefield.

== Construction ==
Surprise was ordered from Yarrow Shipbuilders of Glasgow by the British Admiralty in July 1915 as part of the Sixth War Construction Programme. Surprise was one of 4 Yarrow R-class destroyers ordered as part of this programme, together with 19 Admiralty R-class destroyers and three Thornycroft R-class destroyers. The ship was launched on 25 November 1916 and completed in January 1917. Surprise was built as a Yarrow "special", to Yarrow's own design rather than to the Admiralty's own design for the R-class destroyer. Yarrow's design used direct-drive steam turbines rather than the geared turbines of the Admiralty design, and had two funnels rather than three. As such, they more closely resembled Yarrow M-class Specials,

Surprise's hull was 273 feet 6 inches (83.36 m) long overall, with a beam of 25 feet 7 1/2 inches (7.81 m) and a draught of 9 feet (2.74 m). Displacement was 930 long tons (940 t). Three Yarrow boilers fed Parsons turbines, driving two propeller shafts and generating 27,000 shaft horsepower (20,000 kW). This gave a speed of 36 knots (67 km/h; 41 mph). Armament consisted of three QF Mark IV 4 inch (102 mm) guns, with a single 2-pounder (40-mm) "pom-pom" anti-aircraft gun and four 21 inch (533 mm) torpedo tubes. The ship had a crew of 82 officers and men.

== Service ==
She saw service in the war, being assigned to Harwich Force. On the night of 23/24 January 1917, the Harwich Force was ordered to intercept a German destroyer flotilla that was being transferred from Germany to Zeebrugge, with Surprise part of a group of four destroyers (Simoom, Surprise, Starfish and Milne) patrolling off the Schouwen Bank. The German destroyers ran into a cruiser division, with the destroyers V69 and G41 heavily damaged, but the Germans managed to escape, and passed Surprise's group of destroyers unobserved before reaching Zeebrugge. One German straggler, S50 encountered Starfish's group. An exchange of fire followed, in which S50 was hit several times by British shells, but S50 managed to torpedo Simoom, which later sank, before escaping and returning to Germany. On the night of 4/5 June 1917 the Dover Patrol carried out a bombardment of the German-held port of Ostend using the monitors Erebus and Terror, with the Harwich force sailing to cover the operation. Surprise was one of a group of four light cruisers and nine destroyers patrolling off the Thornton Bank. On 15 July 1917, the Harwich Force sortied to intercept a group of German merchant ships which the Admiralty has learned was due to sail from Rotterdam to Germany. The group of seven merchant ships was intercepted early in the morning of 16 July. Of the seven ships, four were captured by the British, including one, Marie Horn, by Surprise and Teazer, with two more run aground and one towed into IJmuiden.

One of the duties of the Harwich Force destroyers was the so-called "Beef Run", convoys to and from The Netherlands. Surprise was part of the escort of a Netherlands-bound convoy on 22 December, when the destroyer Valkyrie struck a mine and was badly damaged, having to be towed to Harwich by the destroyer Sylph. The remainder of the convoy reached the Hook of Holland safely, and the escort waited near the Maas Light Buoy for the return convoy. At about 02:00 hr on 23 December, Surprise, Torrent, Tornado and Radiant ran into a German minefield, with Torrent striking a German mine. Surprise and Tornado went to rescue Torrent's crew, but Torrent set off a second mine and quickly sank. While she was attempting to rescue survivors and recover her boats, Surprise struck a mine and sank, while Tornado was sunk by two mines while trying to rejoin Radiant. Only Radiant was undamaged and picked up the survivors from the three ships. In total, 12 officers and 240 other ranks were killed from the three ships. There were only seven survivors from Surprise's crew, including her Captain Commander W.A Thompson, who had been blown overboard but was picked up by one of Surprise's boats. 48 of Surprise's crew had been killed.

== Bibliography ==
- Dorling, Taprell (1932). Endless Story: Being an Account of the Work of the Destroyers, Flotilla-Leaders, Torpedo-Boats and Patrol Boats in the Great War. London: Hodder and Stoughton.
- Friedman, Norman (2009). British Destroyers: From Earliest Days to the Second World War. Barnsley, UK: Seaforth Publishing. ISBN 978-1-84832-049-9.
- Gardiner, Robert; Gray, Randal, eds. (1985). Conway's All The World's Fighting Ships 1906–1921. London: Conway Maritime Press. ISBN 0-85177-245-5.
- Karau, Mark D. (2014). The Naval Flank of the Western Front: The German MarineKorps Flandern 1914–1918. Barnsley, UK: Seaforth Publishing. ISBN 978-1-84832-231-8.
- Kemp, Paul (1999). The Admiralty Regrets: British Warship Losses of the 20th Century. Stroud, UK: Sutton Publishing. ISBN 0-7509-1567-6.
- Monograph No. 35: Home Waters—Part IX.: 1st May, 1917 to 31st July, 1917 (PDF). Naval Staff Monographs (Historical). Vol. XIX. The Naval Staff, Training and Staff Duties Division. 1939.
- Newbolt, Henry (1928). History of the Great War: Naval Operations: Volume IV. London: Longmans, Green & Co.
- Preston, Antony (1971). 'V & W' Class Destroyers 1917–1945. London: Macdonald. OCLC 464542895.
