= Allen Turner =

Allen Turner may refer to:

- Allen Turner (cricketer) (1891–1961), English cricketer
- Allen Turner (footballer) (1913–2009), Australian rules footballer
- Brock Allen Turner (1995–present), convicted of sexual assault
