= Derbyshire County Cricket Club in 1919 =

1919 season of an English cricket team

Derbyshire County Cricket Club seasons
1919 season
- Captain: Richard Baggallay
- County Championship: 9
- Most runs: Leonard Oliver
- Most wickets: Billy Bestwick
- Most catches: George Beet

Derbyshire County Cricket Club in 1919 was the first cricket season after a four-year break from first class cricket during World War I. The English club Derbyshire had been playing for forty-eight years with their twenty first season in the County Championship being notable that they won three matches in the County Championship to come ninth.

== 1919 season ==
After the First World War, county cricket resumed in 1919 but everyone connected with the game had to put in much effort to create a very basic competition. Matches were restricted to two days to begin with, but the experiment was not repeated. Derbyshire played 14 matches in the County Championship and one against the Australian Imperial Forces. Derbyshire struggled to create a team, drawing in several youngsters, and also calling upon players who had last represented the club years previously. As a result, they managed three wins in the County Championship and four matches altogether - their particular accomplishment was to defeat the Australian Imperial Forces XI, Derbyshire being the only county side to do so.

Richard Baggallay had been the last captain before the war and he led the team in the resumption of the game although he only played in three matches. John Chapman was the most frequent substitute. Leonard Oliver was top scorer and Billy Bestwick took most wickets with 89. Bestwick had made his debut for Derbyshire in 1898; he had not played for them since 1909 and had a reputation for unreliability on account of taste for beer. He was brought back into the team in 1919 at the age of 43, with Arthur Morton as his minder. Although it was thought he would be past first-class cricket his capability surprised everybody. The 36 runs victory over the Australians was achieved without Bestwick, who, was making his first appearance for the Players against the Gentlemen at Lord's. James Horsley managed a hat-trick, and with Arthur Morton shared nineteen wickets in the two Australian innings. George Beet stepped in behind the stumps, bridging the gap between the stalwarts Joe Humphries and Harry Elliott.

The season marked the beginning of Guy Jackson's long association with the club. Other new players included the Hill-Woods - Basil and Wilfred, Arthur Severn, Louis Flint, Geoffrey Bell and William Malthouse. In addition George Ratcliffe made his single appearance for Derbyshire against the Australians, and John Dunlop Southern made the first of his occasional appearances, also against the Australians.

=== Matches ===
List of matches
No.	Date	V	Result	Margin	Notes
1	19 May 1919	Lancashire; Old Trafford, Manchester	Lost	10 wickets	W Bestwick 5-89
2	30 May 1919	Leicestershire; Aylestone Road, Leicester	Won	9 wickets	W Bestwick 5-44 and 7-109; Benskin 8-86
3	04 Jun 1919	Nottinghamshire; County Ground, Derby	Lost	Innings and 49 runs	WA Flint 6-23
4	09 Jun 1919	Warwickshire; Edgbaston, Birmingham	Won	7 wickets	Oliver 99; W Bestwick 5-103 and 7-50; Howell 7-81
5	13 Jun 1919	Northamptonshire; County Ground, Derby	Won	9 wickets	W Bestwick 6-40 and 5-69
6	18 Jun 1919	Lancashire; Queen's Park, Chesterfield	Lost	Innings and 24 runs	JT Tyldesley 272; W Bestwick 6-153; RK Tyldesley 5-41
7	20 Jun 1919	Yorkshire; Park Avenue Cricket Ground, Bradford	Lost	10 wickets	Blackburn 5-17; J Horsley 6-78
8	02 Jul 1919	Yorkshire; Queen's Park, Chesterfield	Drawn		
9	09 Jul 1919	Somerset; County Ground, Derby	Lost	10 wickets	White 6-56 and 5-58; W Bestwick 5-77; Robson 5-49
10	14 Jul 1919	Australian Imperial Forces; County Ground, Derby	Won	36 runs	J Horsley 6-55 and 6-62; Gregory 6-65
11	23 Jul 1919	Somerset; Recreation Ground, Bath	Lost	3 wickets	White 7-64; Robson 7-19
12	04 Aug 1919	Warwickshire; County Ground, Derby	Lost	10 wickets	Bates 119; W Bestwick 8-178; Howell 5-65
13	08 Aug 1919	Northamptonshire; County Ground, Northampton	Lost	3 wickets	W Bestwick 5-105
14	13 Aug 1919	Leicestershire; Queen's Park, Chesterfield	Lost	4 wickets	Benskin 7-68 and 6-56; W Bestwick 6-75
15	25 Aug 1919	Nottinghamshire; Trent Bridge, Nottingham	Drawn		

== Statistics ==
=== County Championship batting averages ===
Name	Matches	Inns	Runs	High score	Average	100s
BSH Hill-Wood	3	3	52	24	26.00	0
SWA Cadman	10	18	428	78*	25.17	0
G Beet	14	24	492	92*	24.60	0
L Oliver	14	26	625	99	24.03	0
J Chapman	13	24	521	80	22.65	0
WWH Hill-Wood	3	5	102	32	20.40	0
GR Jackson	5	9	183	50	20.33	0
TF Revill	7	12	175	65*	19.44	0
A Severn	9	16	263	73	17.53	0
H Wild	13	22	326	68	17.15	0
CJ Corbett	2	4	51	23	17.00	0
A Morton	14	24	272	46*	12.95	0
J Horsley	11	16	138	19	12.54	0
HF Purdy	2	3	23	13	11.50	0
LE Flint	6	9	88	35	9.77	0
GF Bell	1	2	19	18	9.50	0
RRC Baggallay	3	5	32	16	6.40	0
T Forrester	4	5	23	14	4.60	0
AG Slater	2	4	17	7	4.25	0
W Bestwick	14	21	43	13*	3.07	0
WN Malthouse	2	3	9	5	3.00	0
J Gladwin	1	1	0	0	0.00	0
FA Newton	1	2	0	0	0.00	0

=== County Championship bowling averages ===
Name	Balls	Runs	Wickets	BB	Average
W Bestwick	3289	1614	89	8-178	18.13
A Morton	1861	914	31	4-53	29.48
J Horsley	993	552	24	6-78	23.00
T Forrester	654	305	11	4-45	27.72
SWA Cadman	518	268	7	4-49	38.28
LE Flint	371	217	7	3-30	31.00
BSH Hill-Wood	174	149	4	2-42	37.25
WWH Hill-Wood	132	89	2	1-11	44.50
AG Slater	175	95	2	2-34	47.50
L Oliver	13	14	0		
HF Purdy	36	26	0		
H Wild	36	25	0		

=== Wicket Keeper ===
G Beet Catches 25, Stumping 7

== Derbyshire County Cricketers in the Great War ==
=== Casualties ===
- Frank Bingham played one match for Derbyshire in the 1896 season He was a doctor and an enthusiastic Territorial Army officer, and in the First World War served as a combatant rather than as a military doctor. He was a lieutenant in the 5th Battalion, King's Own Royal Regiment (Lancaster) and became a captain in 1914 and commanded a company. He took part in the Second Battle of Ypres and was killed on 22 May 1915 on a reconnaissance mission after stopping to dig a man out of a collapsed trench. He is commemorated on the Menin Gate.
- Geoffrey Jackson played for Derbyshire from 1912 to 1914, and for Oxford University in 1914. He was given a commission in the Rifle Brigade on the outbreak of World War I and went to France in October, 1914. He was invalided home, after the Second Battle of Ypres, suffering from gas poisoning and spent some months in England serving his Reserve Battalion. He returned to France, as Adjutant of the 1st Battalion, in December, 1915, and was Mentioned in Despatches on 1 January 1916. He served continuously until his death on 9 April 1917 at the Battle of Arras. He was mortally wounded by a piece of shell after advancing about 6000 yards, and died at Faimpoux, Arras, Belgium before reaching the dressing station.
- Charles Newcombe played one first-class cricket match for Derbyshire in 1910, and also played league football for Chesterfield F. C. and Rotherham Town. He served in the First World War in the 7th Bn King's Own Yorkshire Light Infantry as a lieutenant and was killed in action at Fleuraix in France on 27 December 1915. He was buried at Y Farm Military Cemetery, Bois-Grenier
- Guy Wilson played one first class match for Derbyshire in 1902 and one in 1905. He was killed in action during the Battle of Cambrai on 30 November 1917.

=== Awards ===
- RRC Baggallay served in the Irish Guards and was successively captain and major, seeing service at the Somme and Ypres. He was mentioned in despatches and awarded D.S.O. and M.C. in 1919.
- GR Jackson served as a captain at Salonica in January 1918, and was awarded the Military Cross. He was also mentioned in despatches twice and also won the French Legion d’Honneur and the Greek Military Cross. Jackson was leading his troops on patrol when some Bulgarian soldiers approached, carrying a flag of truce. They were asking for the armistice which was to end Bulgaria’s part in the First World War.
- GF Bell won the Military Cross.

== See also ==
- Derbyshire County Cricket Club seasons
- 1919 English cricket season
- Cricket in the Great War
