= Willie Quaife =

English cricketer

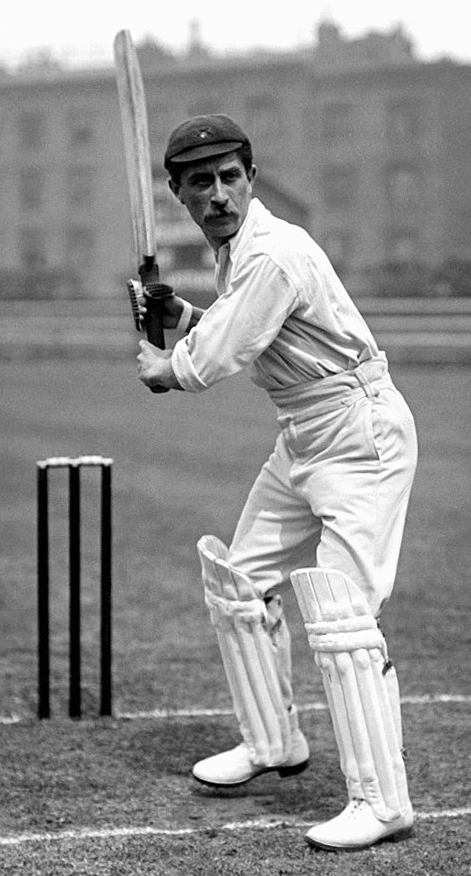
- Quaife in about 1905

Personal information
- Born: 17 March 1872; Newhaven, Sussex
- Died: 13 October 1951 (aged 79); Edgbaston, Birmingham
- Batting: Right-handed
- Bowling: Legbreak

International information
- National side: England
- Test debut: 29 June 1899 v Australia
- Last Test: 28 February 1902 v Australia

Career statistics
Competition	Test	First-class
Matches	7	719
Runs scored	228	36,012
Batting average	19.00	35.37
100s/50s	0/1	72/163
Top score	68	255*
Balls bowled	15	52,080
Wickets	0	931
Bowling average	–	27.32
5 wickets in innings	–	32
10 wickets in match	–	2
Best bowling	–	7/76
Catches/stumpings	4/–	354/1
- Source: CricInfo, 6 November 2022

William George Quaife (17 March 1872 – 13 October 1951) was a cricketer who played for Sussex, Warwickshire and England. He also played representative hockey for the Midlands. At the age of 56 years and 139 days, Quaife is the oldest cricketer to score a century in a County Championship match, doing so in the 1928 tournament. He is also the oldest cricketer to take a five-wicket haul in the County Championship, taking three five-wicket hauls in the 1926 tournament at the age of 54.

== Biography ==
A diminutive right-handed batsman with a strong defence, Quaife played one match for Sussex before moving, with his older brother Walter, to Warwickshire in 1894. He made a century on his debut and, 35 years later at the age of 56, made another on his last appearance for the county in 1928. In between, he scored more than 36,000 runs with a further 70 centuries and, for good measure, took 900 wickets with leg break bowling that, early in his career, was suspected to be illegal. He passed the 1,000 run mark in 25 seasons and was the leading batsman as Warwickshire won the County Championship for the first time in 1911. His career total of 36,012 runs puts him 36th on the all-time list of run-getters.

Quaife made only seven Test match appearances, starting with two matches against the Australians in 1899, and then featuring in all five games on the 1901–02 tour to Australia under Archie MacLaren. He met with little success, except at Adelaide, where he scored 68 and 44 in the third Test.

Quaife also played for W. G. Grace's London County team and spent the winter of 1912–13 playing for Griqualand West in South Africa. He was a Wisden Cricketer of the Year in 1902.

In his playing career, Quaife was usually listed as "W.G.Quaife" and Wisden lists him as "William George Quaife" in its obituary in 1952. The middle initial (or name) appears, however, to have been acquired merely to differentiate him from his brother, Walter, who was eight years his senior and an established Sussex cricketer before moving with William to Warwickshire, where he played until 1901.

Quaife played with his son Bernard twenty times in first-class matches. On one occasion, for Warwickshire against Derbyshire at Derby in 1922, the Quaifes played against the father-son combination of Billy Bestwick and Robert Bestwick. The Smart brothers Jack and Cyril also played for Warwickshire in this match.

After retirement, Quaife became a cricket bat manufacturer.
