= HMS Stork (1916) =

British R-Class destroyer

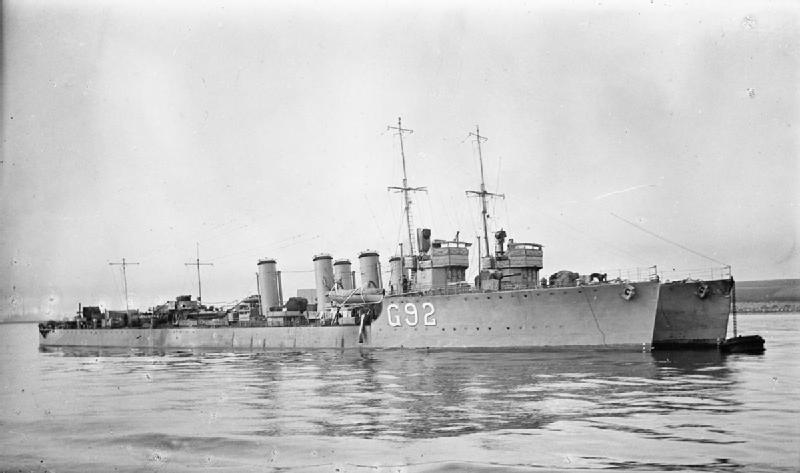
- Two R-class destroyers, sister ship HMS Rob Roy nearest

History

United Kingdom
- Name: HMS Stork
- Ordered: December 1915
- Builder: Hawthorn Leslie, Hebburn
- Laid down: 10 April 1916
- Launched: 25 November 1916
- Completed: 1 February 1917
- Out of service: 7 October 1927
- Fate: Sold to be broken up

General characteristics
- Class & type: R-class destroyer
- Displacement: 975 long tons (991 t) (normal); 1,173 long tons (1,192 t) (deep load)
- Length: 265 ft (80.8 m) (p.p.); 276 ft (84.1 m) (o.a.)
- Beam: 26 ft 8 in (8.1 m)
- Draught: 9 ft (2.7 m)
- Installed power: 3 Yarrow boilers; 27,000 shp (20,000 kW)
- Propulsion: 2 Parsons geared steam turbines, 2 shafts
- Speed: 36 knots (67 km/h; 41 mph)
- Range: 3,450 nmi (6,390 km; 3,970 mi) at 15 knots (28 km/h; 17 mph)
- Complement: 82
- Armament: 3 × single QF 4-inch (102 mm) Mark IV guns; 1 × single 2 pdr 40 mm (1.6 in) AA gun; 2 × twin 21 in (533 mm) torpedo tubes

HMS Stork was an R-class destroyer that served in the Royal Navy during the First World War. The R-class were an improvement on the previous M-class with geared steam turbines to improve efficiency. Launched by Hawthorn Leslie at Hebburn in 1917, Stork joined the Harwich Force. The destroyer saw service escorting convoys in the English Channel and encountered both German submarines and torpedo boats, but did not record any hits on the enemy. The vessel also supported attacks on German forces on the coast of Western Europe by Coastal Motor Boats, flying boats and monitors, including the Zeebrugge Raid of 1918.

After the armistice that ended the war, the destroyer was transferred to the Gunnery School at Nore in 1919. In 1922, the warship carried representatives to the unveiling of war memorials in Dunkirk and Ostend. The Navy decided to retire many of the older vessels as new destroyers were introduced. In 1927, Stork was sold to be broken up.

== Design and development ==
Stork was one of eight R-class destroyers ordered by the British Admiralty in December 1915 as part of the Seventh War Programme. The design was generally similar to the preceding M-class, but differed in having geared steam turbines, the aft gun mounted on a raised platform and minor changes to improve seakeeping.

The destroyer had a length of 265 feet (80.8 m) between perpendiculars and 276 feet (84.1 m) overall, with a beam of 26 feet 8 inches (8.1 m) and a mean draught of 9 feet (2.7 m). The ship's displacement was 975 long tons (991 t) normal and 1,173 long tons (1,192 t) deep load. Power was provided by three Yarrow boilers feeding two Parsons geared steam turbines rated at 27,000 shaft horsepower (20,000 kW) and driving two shafts, to give a design speed of 36 knots (67 km/h; 41 mph). Three funnels were fitted. A total of 296 long tons (301 t) of fuel oil was carried which gave a design range of 3,450 nautical miles (6,390 km; 3,970 mi) at 15 knots (28 km/h; 17 mph).

Armament consisted of three QF 4-inch (102 mm) Mk IV guns on the ship's centreline, with one on the forecastle, one aft on a raised platform and one between the second and third funnels. A single QF 2-pounder 40 mm (1.6 in) "pom-pom" anti-aircraft gun was carried, while torpedo armament consisted of two twin mounts for 21 in (533 mm) torpedoes. The destroyer was subsequently equipped with the ability to drop depth charges. The ship had a complement of 82 officers and ratings.

== Construction and career ==
Laid down by R. & W. Hawthorn, Leslie and Company at their shipyard in Hebburn on 10 April 1916, Stork was launched on 25 November 1916 and completed on 1 February the following year. The destroyer was the sixth to carry the name. Stork was deployed as part of the Harwich Force, joining the Tenth Destroyer Flotilla.

Stork was deployed as an escort for the Dutch traffic, convoys of merchant ships which crossed the English Channel between the United Kingdom and the Netherlands. On 10 May, the destroyer was part of a substantial force, including light cruisers, returning from escort duties which spotted a flotilla of twelve German destroyers from the 3rd Torpedo-Boat Flotilla and the Zeebrugge Half Flotilla. Stork led a division of destroyers that pursued the enemy until they sought refuge under the shore batteries at Zeebrugge. Some hits were reported, but the German ships escaped. On 17 May, Stork and sister ship Sylph left Harwich at the head of two divisions of destroyers escorting a convoy of more than a dozen merchant ships in foggy weather when they came under attack from German destroyers. A confused fight ensued during which the destroyer Setter was rammed and sunk by Sylph, and SS Cito was sunk by the German warships. In the confusion of battle it is unclear which members of either the 3rd Torpedo-Boat Flotilla or the Zeebrugge Half Flotilla were involved in the action as both were deployed against convoys on the route that night. On the following day, Stork unsuccessfully attacked the German submarine UC-64 with depth charges.

On 11 April 1918, the destroyer had the opportunity to return to the fortifications at Zeebrugge. Stork formed part of a force of 165 Royal Navy vessels, including the monitors Erebus and Terror sent to bombard the town. The mission succeeded in partially blocking the harbour and placed limits on the way it could be used by submarines. Later that year, on 18 August, Stork formed part of an escort for destroyers towing lighters which carried Thornycroft Coastal Motor Boats, Curtis Large American flying boats and Sopwith Camels with the aim of attacking German assets close to the Western European coast. Initially, the assignment was not a success as the majority of the aircraft failed to take off and the boats were all sunk or interned, but subsequently one of the aircraft shot down the Zeppelin LZ 100.

After the Armistice of 11 November 1918 that ended the war, the navy needed to move to a peacetime level of operational capability. Stork was moved from active service and transferred to the Gunnery School at Nore. Stork was employed to accompany the Duke of York to Dunkirk on 25 July 1922, transporting 200 British Army soldiers to the unveiling of a war memorial to those who had died in the First World War. On 4 September, the ship then carried representatives of the British Army to a similar event in Ostend. The destroyer also formed an escort for the floating dock, which was transferred from Chatham to Portland on 25 November 1923.

On 29 July 1925, Stork took part in an exercise with Garrison Point Fort, Sheerness. Stork approached from the River Medway and exchanged blanks with the ravelin battery. This proved one of the last operations the ship participated in. The navy needed to reduce both the number of ships and the amount of staff to save money and decided to scrap many of the older destroyers in preparation for the introduction of newer and larger vessels. Stork was sold to Cashmore of Newport, Wales, on 7 October 1927 to be broken up.

== Pennant numbers ==
Pennant number	Date
F66	September 1915
F65	January 1918
G60	January 1919
H90	January 1922
