= HMS Satyr (1916) =

Destroyer of the Royal Navy

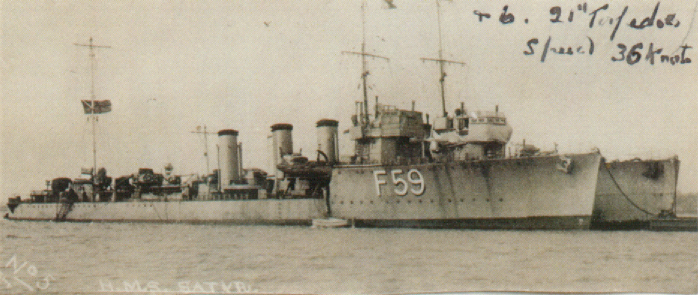
- HMS Satyr in 1918 at Harwich where she was stationed

History

United Kingdom
- Name: HMS Satyr
- Builder: William Beardmore and Company, Dalmuir
- Yard number: 549
- Laid down: April 1916
- Launched: 27 December 1916
- Completed: 2 February 1917
- Out of service: 16 December 1926
- Fate: Sold to be broken up

General characteristics
- Class & type: R-class destroyer
- Displacement: 975 long tons (991 t) normal; 1,075 long tons (1,092 t) deep load
- Length: 276 ft (84.1 m)
- Beam: 26 ft 6 in (8.1 m)
- Draught: 9 ft (2.7 m)
- Propulsion: 3 Yarrow boilers; 2 geared Parsons steam turbines, 27,000 shp (20,000 kW)
- Speed: 36 knots (41.4 mph; 66.7 km/h)
- Range: 3,450 nmi (6,390 km) at 15 kn (28 km/h)
- Complement: 82
- Armament: 3 × single QF 4-inch (102 mm) Mark IV guns; 1 × single 2-pdr 40 mm (2 in) AA gun; 2 × twin 21 in (533 mm) torpedo tubes

HMS Satyr was an R-class destroyer which served with the Royal Navy during the First World War. Launched on 27 December 1916, Satyr joined the Harwich Force under the command of Commander Hubert de Burgh. In 1917, the destroyer formed part of a force protecting the monitors Erebus and Terror in their bombardment of Ostend. As part of this action, Satyr, along with sister ships Taurus, Sharpshooter and Torrent, sank the German destroyer S20. After the war, the ship served with the Torpedo School at the Devonport. In 1923, the Navy decided to retire many of the older destroyers in preparation for the introduction of newer and larger vessels and Satyr was sold to be broken up on 16 December 1926.

== Design and development ==
Satyr was one of ten R-class destroyers ordered by the British Admiralty in December 1915 as part of the Seventh War Construction Programme. The design was generally similar to the preceding M-class destroyers, but differed in having geared steam turbines, the central gun mounted differently and minor changes to improve seakeeping.

Satyr was 276 feet (84.12 m) long overall, with a beam of 26 feet 6 inches (8.08 m) and a draught of 9 feet (2.74 m). Displacement was 975 long tons (991 t) normal and 1,075 long tons (1,092 t) deep load. Power was provided by three Yarrow boilers feeding two Parsons geared steam turbines rated at 27,000 shaft horsepower (20,000 kW) and driving two shafts, to give a design speed of 36 knots (67 km/h; 41 mph). Three funnels were fitted. A total of 296 long tons (301 t) of fuel oil was carried, giving a design range of 3,450 nautical miles (6,390 km; 3,970 mi) at 15 knots (28 km/h; 17 mph).

Armament consisted of three QF 4in Mk IV guns on the ship's centreline, with one on the forecastle, one aft on a raised platform and one between the second and third funnels. A single 2-pounder (40 mm) pom-pom anti-aircraft gun was carried, while torpedo armament consisted of two twin rotating mounts for 21 in (533 mm) torpedoes. The ship had a complement of 82 officers and ratings.

== Construction and career ==
Satyr was laid down at the William Beardmore and Company shipyard in Dalmuir during April 1916 with yard number 549, launched in December 1916 and completed on 2 February 1917. The destroyer cost £150,103 to build. On commissioning, Satyr joined the 10th Destroyer Flotilla of the Harwich Force. The commanding officer was Commander Hubert de Burgh.

On 4 June 1917, Satyr was deployed as part of a large group of 7 cruisers and 25 destroyers to protect the monitors Erebus and Terror in their bombardment of the German held Belgian port of Ostend. Along with sister ships Taurus, Sharpshooter and Torrent, Satyr sank the German destroyer S20. De Burgh received the Distinguished Service Order for his part in the action, particularly for saving the lives of seven of the crew of S20 while under fire.

Satyr remained part of the 10th Destroyer Flotilla at the end of the war, but by February 1919, had been transferred to the Torpedo School at the Devonport. In 1923, the Navy decided to scrap many of the older destroyers in preparation for the introduction of newer and larger vessels. Satyr was one of those chosen to retire and was sold to Thos. W. Ward of Milford Haven on 16 December 1926 and broken up.

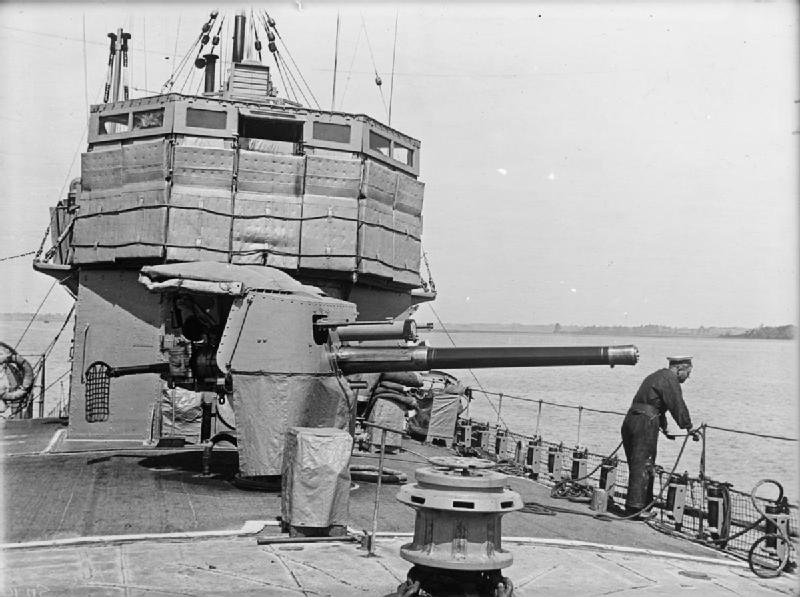
Close-up view of the 4-inch gun on the foc'sle of the 'R' class destroyer HMS Satyr

== Pennant numbers ==
Pennant numbers
Pennant number	Date
F51	January 1917
F59	January 1918
G52	January 1919
H78	Unknown
