= HMS Torrent =

Destroyer of the Royal Navy

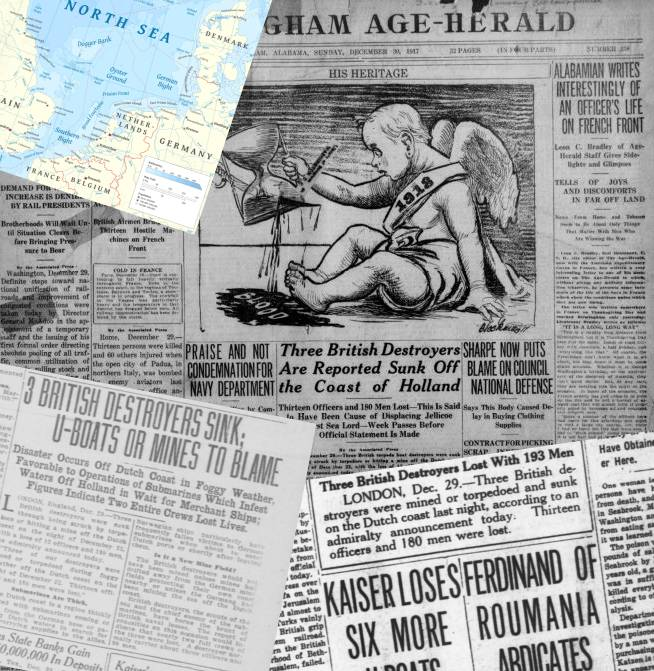
- US media coverage of the sinking of HMS Surprise, HMS Torrent, and Tornado sank after entering an Imperial German minefield.

History

United Kingdom
- Name: HMS Torrent
- Builder: Hawthorn Leslie, Hebburn Tyne
- Launched: 26 November 1916
- Completed: February 1917
- Fate: Sunk by mines 23 December 1917

General characteristics
- Class & type: R-class destroyer
- Displacement: 975 long tons (991 t)
- Length: 276 ft (84.1 m)
- Draught: 9 ft 10 in (3.00 m)
- Propulsion: 3 boilers; 2 geared Brown Curtis steam turbines, 27,000 shp
- Speed: 36 knots (41.4 mph; 66.7 km/h)
- Range: 3,440 nmi (6,370 km) at 15 kn (28 km/h)
- Complement: 82
- Armament: 3 × QF 4-inch (101.6 mm) Mark IV guns; 1 × single 2-pounder (40-mm) "pom-pom" Mk. II anti-aircraft gun; 4 × 21 in (533 mm) torpedo tubes (2×2)

HMS Torrent was a Royal Navy R-class destroyer constructed and then operational in the First World War. She was sunk, with most of her crew in 1917. On 23 December 1917 Surprise, HMS Torrent, and Tornado sank after entering an Imperial German minefield.

== Construction ==
Torrent was ordered from Swan Hunter by the British Admiralty in March 1916 as part of the Eighth War Construction Programme. (Note: Torrent was one of 12 Admiralty R-class destroyers ordered as part of this programme, together with three Yarrow M-class destroyers and 11 Admiralty Modified R-class destroyers.) The ship was launched at Swan Hunter's Wallsend, Tyne and Wear shipyard on 26 November 1916 and completed in February 1917.

Torrent was 276 feet (84.12 m) long overall, with a beam of 26 feet 6 inches (8.08 m) and a draught of 9 feet (2.74 m). Displacement was 975 long tons (991 t) normal and 1,075 long tons (1,092 t) deep load. Three Yarrow boilers fed steam to two sets of Brown-Curtis geared steam turbines rated at 27,000 shaft horsepower (20,000 kW) and driving two shafts, giving a design speed of 36 knots (67 km/h; 41 mph). Three funnels were fitted. 296 tons of oil were carried, giving a design range of 3,450 nautical miles (6,390 km; 3,970 mi) at 15 knots (28 km/h; 17 mph). Armament consisted of three QF 4in Mk IV guns on the ship's centreline, with one on the forecastle, one aft on a raised bandstand and one between the second and third funnels. A single 2-pounder (40 mm) pom-pom anti-aircraft gun was fitted, while torpedo armament consisted of four 21 inch (533 mm) torpedoes in two twin mounts. The ship had a complement of 82 officers and men.

== Service ==
On commissioning, Torrent joined the 10th Destroyer Flotilla of the Harwich Force. On the night of 4/5 June 1917 the Dover Patrol carried out a bombardment of the German-held port of Ostend using the monitors Erebus and Terror, with the Harwich force sailing to cover the operation. Torrent was one of a group of four light cruisers and nine destroyers patrolling off the Thornton Bank. At about 02:30 hr the group encountered two German torpedo boats S15 and S20. The two torpedo boats retreated under heavy fire towards Zeebrugge, and Torrent, along with Satyr, Sharpshooter and Taurus were ordered to pursue. S20 was immobilised by a hit in the boiler room and was sunk, while S15, although heavily damaged, was able to escape, with the British destroyers turning back to avoid fire from shore batteries. The shore bombardment sank the German submarine UC-70 (Note: UC-70 was later salvaged and repaired, and was sunk permanently by the British destroyer Ouse on 28 August 1918.) and damaged UC-16 and the torpedo boats G41 and S55.

One of the duties of the Harwich Force destroyers was the so-called "Beef Run", convoys to and from The Netherlands. Torrent was part of the escort of a Netherlands-bound convoy on 22 December, when the destroyer Valkyrie struck a mine and was badly damaged, having to be towed to Harwich by the destroyer Sylph. The remainder of the convoy reached the Hook of Holland safely, and the escort waited near the Maas Light Buoy for the return convoy. At about 02:00 hr on 23 December, Torrent, Surprise, Tornado and Radiant ran into a German minefield, with Torrent striking a German mine. Surprise and Tornado went to rescue Torrent's crew, but Torrent struck a second mine and quickly sank. In an attempt to rescue survivors, Surprise and Tornado also struck mines and sank. Only Radiant was undamaged and picked up the survivors from the three ships. In total, 12 officers and 240 other ranks were killed from the three ships. Only three of Torrent's crew survived, with 68 killed.

== Bibliography ==
- Dorling, Taprell (1932). Endless Story: Being an Account of the Work of the Destroyers, Flotilla-Leaders, Torpedo-Boats and Patrol Boats in the Great War. London: Hodder and Stoughton.
- Friedman, Norman (2009). British Destroyers: From Earliest Days to the Second World War. Barnsley, UK: Seaforth Publishing. ISBN 978-1-84832-049-9.
- Gardiner, Robert; Gray, Randal, eds. (1985). Conway's All The World's Fighting Ships 1906–1921. London: Conway Maritime Press. ISBN 0-85177-245-5.
- Gröner, Erich (1985). Die deutschen Kriegsschiffe 1815–1945: Band 3: U-Boote, Hilfkreuzer, Minenschiffe, Netzleger, Sperrbrecher (in German). Koblenz, Germany: Bernard & Graefe Verlag. ISBN 3-7637-4802-4.
- Karau, Mark D. (2014). The Naval Flank of the Western Front: The German MarineKorps Flandern 1914–1918. Barnsley, UK: Seaforth Publishing. ISBN 978-1-84832-231-8.
- Kemp, Paul (1999). The Admiralty Regrets: British Warship Losses of the 20th Century. Stroud, UK: Sutton Publishing. ISBN 0-7509-1567-6.
- Pare, Andy (2015). Call The Hands: Bridlington's Lost Mariners 1914–1919. Bridlington: Lodge Books. ISBN 978-1-326-40929-6.
- Preston, Antony (1971). 'V & W' Class Destroyers 1917–1945. London: Macdonald. OCLC 464542895.
