= HMS Tornado =

Destroyer of the Royal Navy

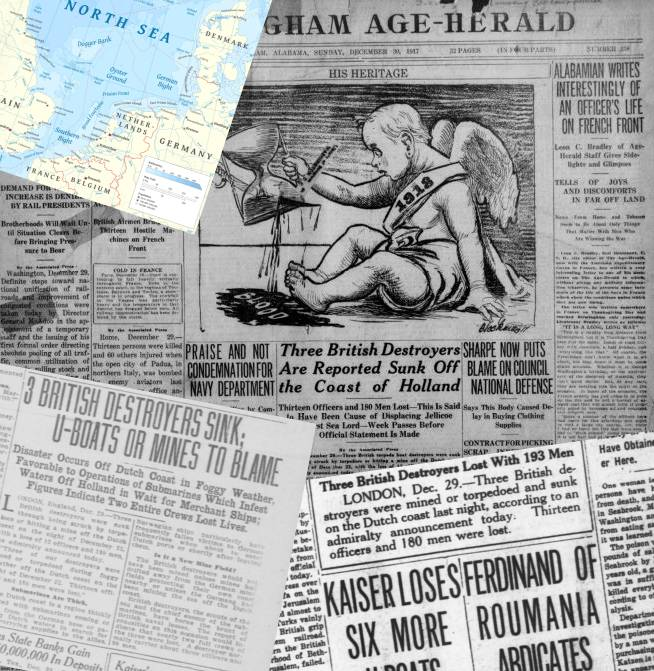
- US media coverage of HMS Surprise, HMS Torrent, and HMS Tornado sank after entering an Imperial German minefield.

History

United Kingdom
- Name: HMS Tornado
- Builder: Alexander Stephen and Sons, Linthouse
- Launched: 4 August 1917
- Completed: November 1917
- Fate: Mined 23 December 1917

General characteristics
- Class & type: R-class destroyer
- Displacement: 975 long tons (991 t)
- Length: 276 ft (84.1 m)
- Beam: 26 ft 6 in (8.08 m)
- Draught: 9 ft 2 in (2.79 m)
- Propulsion: 3 boilers; 2 geared Brown Curtis steam turbines, 27,000 shp (20,000 kW)
- Speed: 36 knots (41.4 mph; 66.7 km/h)
- Range: 3,440 nmi (6,370 km) at 15 kn (28 km/h)
- Complement: 82
- Armament: 3 × QF 4-inch (101.6 mm) Mark IV guns; 1 × single 2-pounder (40-mm) "pom-pom" Mk. II anti-aircraft gun; 4 × 21 in (533 mm) torpedo tubes (2×2)

HMS Tornado was a Royal Navy R-class destroyer constructed and then operational in the First World War. She was sunk, with most of her crew in 1917. On 23 December 1917 HMS Surprise, HMS Torrent, and HMS Tornado sank after entering an Imperial German minefield.

== Construction ==
Tornado was ordered from Alexander Stephen and Sons by the British Admiralty in March 1916 as part of the Eighth War Construction Programme. (Note: Tornado was one of 12 Admiralty R-class destroyers ordered as part of this programme, together with three Yarrow M-class destroyers and 11 Admiralty Modified R-class destroyers.) The ship was launched at Stephen's Linthouse, Clydeside shipyard on 4 August 1917 and completed in November 1917.

Tornado was 276 feet (84.12 m) long overall, with a beam of 26 feet 6 inches (8.08 m) and a draught of 9 feet (2.74 m). Displacement was 975 long tons (991 t) normal and 1,075 long tons (1,092 t) deep load. Three Yarrow boilers fed steam to two sets of Brown-Curtis geared steam turbines rated at 27,000 shaft horsepower (20,000 kW) and driving two shafts, giving a design speed of 36 knots (67 km/h; 41 mph). Three funnels were fitted. 296 tons of oil were carried, giving a design range of 3,450 nautical miles (6,390 km; 3,970 mi) at 15 knots (28 km/h; 17 mph). Armament consisted of three QF 4in Mk IV guns on the ship's centreline, with one on the forecastle, one aft on a raised bandstand and one between the second and third funnels. A single 2-pounder (40 mm) pom-pom anti-aircraft gun was fitted, while torpedo armament consisted of four 21 inch (533 mm) torpedoes in two twin mounts. The ship had a complement of 82 officers and men.

== Service ==
On commissioning, Tornado joined the 10th Destroyer Flotilla of the Harwich Force. One of the duties of the Harwich Force destroyers was the so-called "Beef Run", convoys to and from The Netherlands. Tornado was part of the escort of a Netherlands-bound convoy on 22 December, when the destroyer Valkyrie struck a mine and was badly damaged, having to be towed to Harwich by the destroyer Sylph. The remainder of the convoy reached the Hook of Holland safely, and the escort waited near the Maas Light Buoy for the return convoy. At about 02:00 hr on 23 December, Tornado, Surprise, Torrent and Radiant ran into a German minefield, with Torrent striking a German mine. Surprise and Tornado went to rescue Torrent's crew, but Torrent struck a second mine and quickly sank. Tornado struck two mines and sunk while trying to rejoin Radiant, which was standing off protecting the rescue efforts from any interference from German U-boats, while Surprise also struck a mine and sunk. Only Radiant remained afloat and undamaged and picked up the survivors from the three ships. Only two survivors were picked up from Tornado with 75 killed. In total, 12 officers and 240 other ranks were killed from the three ships.

== Bibliography ==
- Dorling, Taprell (1932). Endless Story: Being an Account of the Work of the Destroyers, Flotilla-Leaders, Torpedo-Boats and Patrol Boats in the Great War. London: Hodder and Stoughton.
- Friedman, Norman (2009). British Destroyers: From Earliest Days to the Second World War. Barnsley, UK: Seaforth Publishing. ISBN 978-1-84832-049-9.
- Gardiner, Robert; Gray, Randal, eds. (1985). Conway's All The World's Fighting Ships 1906–1921. London: Conway Maritime Press. ISBN 0-85177-245-5.
- Kemp, Paul (1999). The Admiralty Regrets: British Warship Losses of the 20th Century. Stroud, UK: Sutton Publishing. ISBN 0-7509-1567-6.
- Pare, Andy (2015). Call The Hands: Bridlington's Lost Mariners 1914–1919. Bridlington: Lodge Books. ISBN 978-1-326-40929-6.
- Preston, Antony (1971). 'V & W' Class Destroyers 1917–1945. London: Macdonald. OCLC 464542895.
