= Albert Woodland =

English cricketer (1895–1955)

Albert Woodland (10 June 1895 – 31 January 1955) was an English cricketer who played first-class cricket for Derbyshire in 1920.

Woodland was born in Conisbrough, Yorkshire. He joined Derbyshire in the 1920 season and began in a game for the county against Dublin University. He made his first-class debut for Derbyshire in a match against Warwickshire during May 1920, playing as the third bowler and a tailend batsman, but took no wickets. His second and final first-class fixture came against Essex when he bowled three overs and scored single figures in both innings. Woodland was a right-handed batsman with a top score of 19 not out, and a right-arm medium-fast bowler who bowled 15 overs without a wicket.

Woodland died in Mansfield at the age of 59.
