= HMS Simoom (1916) =

Destroyer of the Royal Navy

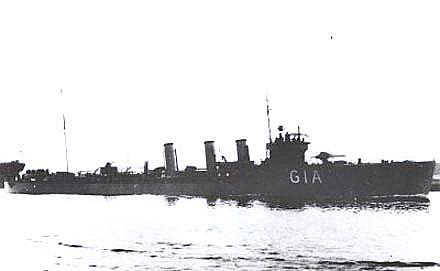
- HMS Simoom in 1916

History

United Kingdom
- Name: HMS Simoom
- Namesake: Simoom
- Ordered: December 1915
- Builder: John Brown & Company, Clydebank
- Yard number: 455
- Laid down: 23 May 1916
- Launched: 30 October 1916
- Commissioned: 22 December 1916
- Out of service: 23 January 1917
- Fate: Torpedoed by SMS S50 and sunk

General characteristics
- Class & type: R-class destroyer
- Displacement: 975 long tons (991 t) normal; 1,173 long tons (1,192 t) deep load
- Length: 276 ft (84.1 m) p.p.
- Beam: 26 ft 9 in (8.15 m)
- Draught: 9 ft (2.7 m) mean
- Propulsion: 3 Yarrow boilers; 2 geared Brown-Curtis steam turbines, 27,000 shp (20,000 kW)
- Speed: 36 knots (41.4 mph; 66.7 km/h)
- Range: 3,450 nmi (6,390 km) at 15 kn (28 km/h)
- Complement: 90
- Armament: 3 × QF 4-inch (101.6 mm) Mark IV guns, mounting P Mk. IX; 1 × single 2-pounder (40-mm) "pom-pom" Mk. II anti-aircraft gun; 4 × 21 in (533 mm) torpedo tubes (2×2)

HMS Simoom (sometimes incorrectly spelled Simoon) was an R-class destroyer which served with the Royal Navy during World War I. Launched on 30 October 1916, the vessel operated as part of the Harwich Force until torpedoed by the German destroyer S50 on 23 January 1917. The ship's magazine exploded and 47 people died. The name was reused by the first S-class destroyer, Simoom, launched on 26 January 1918.

== Design and development ==
Simoom was one of eight R-class destroyers ordered by the British Admiralty on 21 December 1915 as part of the Seventh War Construction Programme. The design was generally similar to the preceding M class, but differed in having geared turbines, the central gun mounted on a bandstand and minor changes to improve seakeeping. The ship was named after the simoom, a dry wind that sweeps across the Arabian peninsula.

The destroyer was 276 feet (84.12 m) long overall, with a beam of 26 feet 9 inches (8.15 m) and a draught of 9 feet (2.74 m). Displacement was 1,173 long tons (1,192 t). Power was provided by three Yarrow boilers feeding two Brown-Curtis geared steam turbines rated at 27,000 shaft horsepower (20,000 kW). Each turbine drove a single shaft to give a design speed of 36 knots (67 km/h; 41 mph). Two funnels were fitted, two boilers exhausting through the forward funnel. A total of 296 long tons (301 t) of fuel oil was carried, giving a design range of 3,450 nautical miles (6,390 km; 3,970 mi) at 15 knots (28 km/h; 17 mph).

Armament consisted of three 4 in (102 mm) Mk IV QF guns on the ship's centreline, with one on the forecastle, one aft on a raised platform and one between the funnels. A single 2-pounder (40 mm) pom-pom anti-aircraft gun was carried, while torpedo armament consisted of two twin mounts for 21 in (533 mm) torpedoes. The ship had a complement of 90 officers and ratings.

== Construction and career ==
Construction was very swift, with the keel laid down by John Brown & Company at Clydebank in May 1916, launching taking place in October and fitting out completed in December. The build took a very impressive 214 days, faster than any of the rest of the class. The vessel started preliminary trials on 16 December, completing trials in six days. On commissioning, Simoom joined the 10th Destroyer Flotilla as part of the Harwich Force under the flotilla leader Nimrod. The destroyer was allocated the pennant number F57.

The vessel formed part of the force led by Commodore Reginald Tyrwhitt that put out to intercept a flotilla of eleven destroyers of the Imperial German Navy, led by the flotilla leader V69, in the North Sea on 22 January 1917. Alongside fellow destroyers Milne, Starfish and Surprise, Simoom was allocated to patrol the Schouwen Bank. During a confused night battle, the destroyer S50 became separated from the rest of the German fleet. The lone destroyer surprised Simoom, which was leading the line of British vessels, in the early hours of the following day. Gunfire was exchanged, then S50 managed to unleash a torpedo which hit a magazine and a huge explosion engulfed Simoom. There were 47 casualties, the 43 survivors being rescued by Morris, and the remains of the vessel were sunk by gunfire by Nimrod.

When the first S-class destroyer, Simoom, was launched on 26 January 1918, the name was reused in honour of this vessel.
