= HMS Radiant =

Destroyer of the Royal Navy

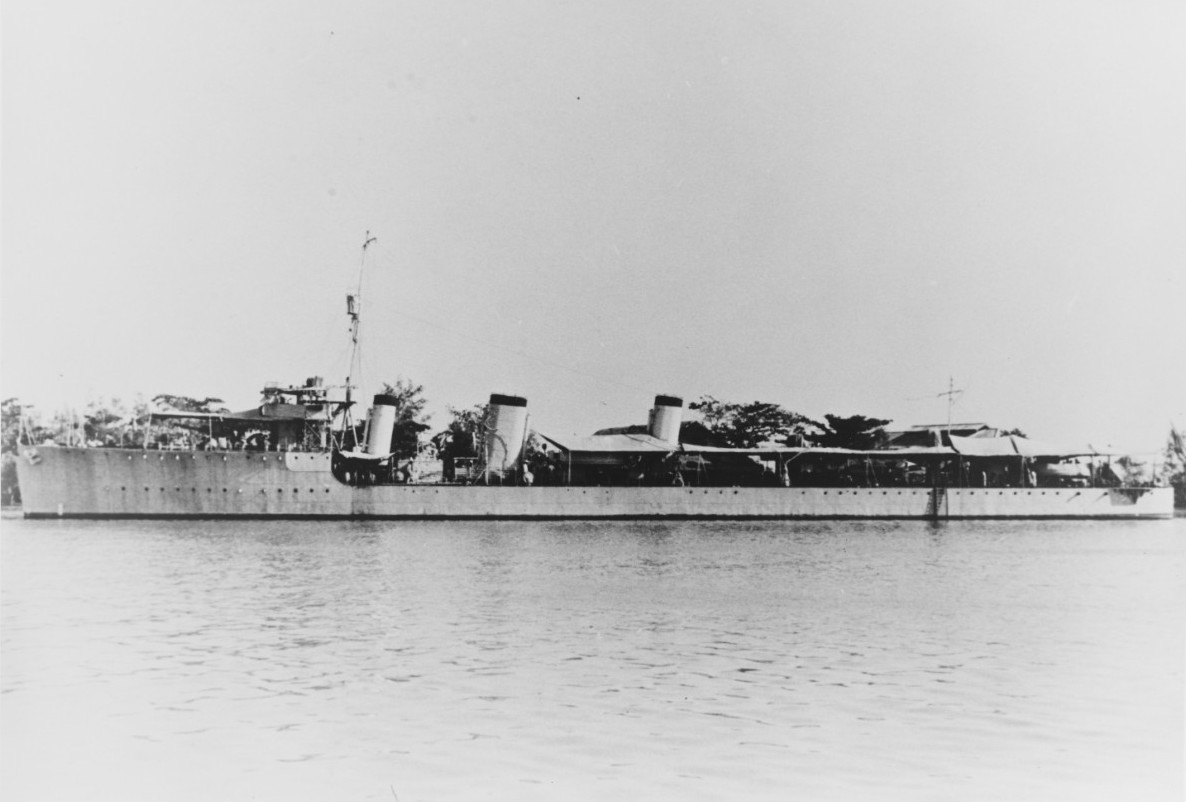
- HTMS Phra Ruang at Bangkok on 29 November 1955

History

United Kingdom
- Name: Radiant
- Ordered: July 1915
- Builder: Thornycroft
- Launched: 25 November 1916
- Commissioned: February 1917
- Fate: Sold on 21 June 1920
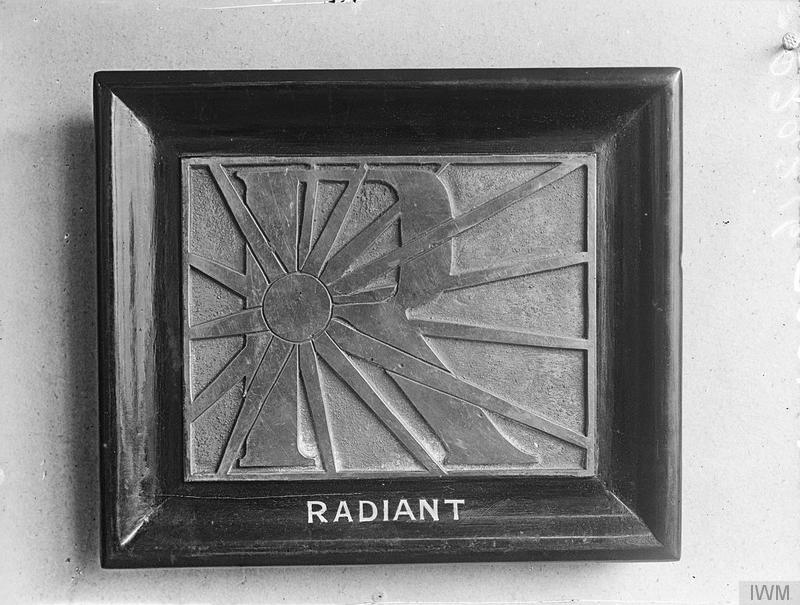
- Badge

Thailand
- Name: Phra Ruang
- Namesake: Phra Ruang
- Acquired: September 1920
- Decommissioned: 1957
- Stricken: 1959

General characteristics
- Type: R-class destroyer
- Displacement: Normal: 1,035 long tons (1,052 t); Full: 1,208 long tons (1,227 t)
- Length: 276 ft (84.1 m)
- Beam: 26 ft 9 in (8.15 m)
- Draught: 9 ft 10 in (3.00 m)
- Installed power: 3 × boilers; 27,000 shaft horsepower (20,000 kW)
- Propulsion: 2 × geared Brown Curtis steam turbines, 2 × shafts
- Speed: 36 knots (67 km/h; 41 mph)
- Range: 3,440 nmi (6,370 km) at 15 kn (28 km/h)
- Complement: 82
- Armament: 3 × QF 4-inch (101.6 mm) Mark IV guns, mounting P Mk. IX; 1 × 76.2 mm (3.00 in) gun; 1 × 2-pounder (40-mm) "pom-pom" Mk. II anti-aircraft gun; 4 × 21 in (533 mm) torpedo tubes (2×2)

HMS Radiant was an R-class destroyer which fought in the First World War as part of the Royal Navy before being transferred to the Royal Thai Navy, in which she served until well after the Second World War.

== Royal Navy service ==
She was built by John I. Thornycroft & Company at Woolston and launched 25 November 1916. Radiant served with the 10th Destroyer Flotilla of Harwich Force from April 1917 until February 1919. During the night of 23 December 1917, while escorting of a convoy off the coast of Holland, she came to the rescue of the Harwich Force destroyers Torrent, Surprise and Tornado after the destroyers ran into a German minefield. Torrent struck a mine, and when attempting a rescue, Surprise and Tornado also hit mines, resulting in the three destroyers being lost. Radiant picked up all survivors that could be found. This accounted for twelve officers and sailors, with the losses of 252 officers and men from the three destroyers.

After the First World War, she was briefly assigned to the 4th Destroyer Flotilla of the Home Fleet before paying off and being laid up in reserve as part of the Nore Command until sold.

== Thai Navy service ==
She was sold back to Thornycroft on 21 June 1920, who then sold her on to the Royal Thai Navy in September 1920. She was renamed HTMS Phra Ruang (Thai: เรือหลวงพระร่วง). It is believed that in order to finance her acquisition King Rama VI and other senior figures donated personally to the finance fund, making this the first publication donation of money to procure a warship in Thailand. The Royal Prince Admiral Abhakara Kiartivongse went to England to negotiate the purchase personally and command the ship during its subsequent voyage from England to Thailand.

On 29 January 1943, the submarine USS Trout launched three torpedoes at a destroyer believed to be Phra Ruang and watched each run true to the target. However, all proved to be duds.

Because of her continued service in the Thai Navy, the destroyer was the last survivor of the Royal Navy's First World War destroyers. She was used as a training ship toward the end of her career, removed from the effective list in 1957, and stricken in 1959. (Note: Contrary to a common misconception, the vessel preserved at the Prince Abhakara memorial in Chumphon (10°23′54″N 99°16′45″E) is the 1930s-era Italian-built torpedo boat Chumphon, not Phra Ruang (ex-Radiant).)

== Bibliography ==
- Colledge, J. J.; Warlow, Ben (2006) [1969]. Ships of the Royal Navy: The Complete Record of All Fighting Ships of the Royal Navy from the 15th Century to the Present (3rd Rev ed.). London: Chatham Publishing. ISBN 978-1-86176-281-8. OCLC 67375475.
- Friedman, Norman (2009). British Destroyers: From Earliest Days to the Second World War. Barnsley, UK: Seaforth Publishing. ISBN 978-1-84832-049-9.
- Gardiner, Robert & Gray, Randal, eds. (1985). Conway's All The World's Fighting Ships 1906–1921. London: Conway Maritime Press. ISBN 0-85177-245-5.
- March, Edgar J. (1966). British Destroyers: A History of Development, 1892–1953; Drawn by Admiralty Permission From Official Records & Returns, Ships' Covers & Building Plans. London: Seeley Service. OCLC 164893555.
