= Douglas Linathan =

English cricketer

Douglas Valentine Linathan (29 May 1885 — 17 December 1932) was an English cricketer who played for Derbyshire in 1920.

Linathan was born in Sheffield. He played three matches for Derbyshire during the 1920 season making his debut against Yorkshire in July, a game in which he made one catch but little progress with the bat or ball. He played two further matches for the side. Against Nottinghamshire he finished not out in the first innings, batting in the lower order. In his third and last appearance against Warwickshire he was bowled out twice by five-time Test cricketer Harry Howell. Linathan was a left-handed batsman and played 6 innings in 3 first-class matches with an average of 7 and a top score of 14. He was a left-arm slow bowler and took 1 wicket at an average of 78.00.

Linathan died in Derby at the age of 47.
