= HMS Valkyrie =

The name HMS Valkyrie was borne by a ship and a training establishment of the Royal Navy:

- HMS Valkyrie (1917) was a First World War V-class flotilla leader of the Royal Navy. Launched in 1918 she was sold to be scrapped in 1936.
- HMS Valkyrie (shore establishment) was a stone frigate training establishment situated on Douglas Head on the Isle of Man. This was established in about 1940, mainly to provide advanced courses for radio (radar) mechanics, both male and female (the latter in the Women's Royal Naval Service or Wrens).
