= John Davis (sportsman, born 1882) =

English footballer and cricketer (1882–1963)

Jack Davis
Personal information
- Full name: John William Davis
- Date of birth: 10 April 1882
- Place of birth: Ironville, England
- Date of death: 1963 (aged 80–81)
- Place of death: Ripley, Derbyshire, England
- Position: Winger

Senior career*
Years	Team	Apps	(Gls)
1902–1903	Grimsby Town	0	(0)
1903–1904	Somercotes United		
1904–1910	Derby County	138	(9)
1910–1911	Ilkeston United		
1911–1912	Eastwood Rangers		
1912–1913	Sutton Junction		
1913	Ilkeston United		
Total		138	(9)
- * Club domestic league appearances and goals

John Davis
Cricket information
- Batting: Right-handed

Domestic team information
- Years: Team
- 1920: Derbyshire
- Only FC: 14 August 1920 Derbyshire v Essex

Career statistics
Competition	First-class
Matches	1
Runs scored	9
Batting average	4.50
100s/50s	0/0
Top score	8
Catches/stumpings	2/–
- Source: CricketArchive, October 2011

John William Davis (10 April 1882 – 29 October 1963) was an English footballer who played in the Football League for Derby County; he was also a cricketer who played first-class cricket for Derbyshire in 1920.

Davis was born at Ironville, Derbyshire. He is recorded as having performed prodigiously for Quorn Cricket Club He played one match for Derbyshire during the 1920 season. This was in August against Essex when he made 8 and 1 in his two innings and made two catches. Davis was a right-hand batsman who played 2 innings in 1 first-class match making a total of 9.

Davis died at Ripley, Derbyshire at the age of 81.
