= HMS Taurus (1917) =

Destroyer of the Royal Navy

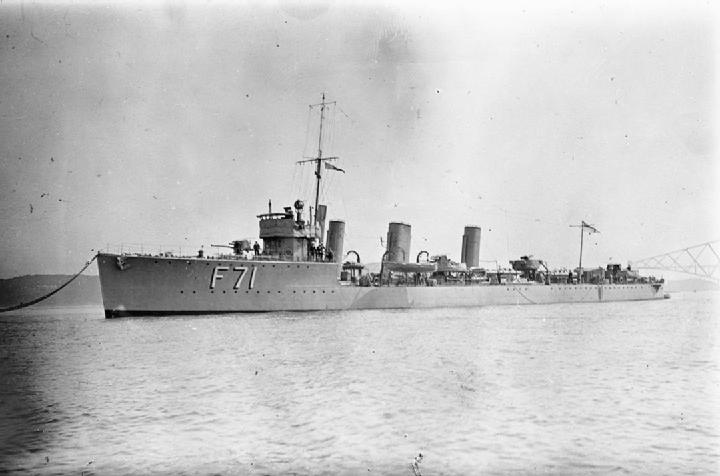
- HMS Taurus

History

United Kingdom
- Name: HMS Taurus
- Namesake: Taurus astrological sign and constellation
- Ordered: December 1915
- Builder: Thornycroft, Woolston
- Laid down: March 1916
- Launched: 10 March 1917
- Commissioned: May 1917
- Out of service: 18 February 1930
- Fate: Sold to be broken up

General characteristics
- Class & type: R-class destroyer
- Displacement: 1,035 long tons (1,052 t) normal 1,208 long tons (1,227 t) full
- Length: 274 ft 3 in (83.6 m) (o.a.)
- Beam: 27 ft (8.2 m)
- Draught: 11 ft (3.4 m)
- Installed power: 3 Yarrow boilers, 29,000 shp (22,000 kW)
- Propulsion: Brown-Curtis geared steam turbines, 2 shafts
- Speed: 35 knots (40 mph; 65 km/h)
- Range: 3,450 nautical miles (6,390 km) at 20 knots (37 km/h)
- Complement: 82
- Armament: 3 × QF 4 inches (102 mm) Mark IV guns, mounting P Mk. IX; 1 × single 2-pounder (40 mm) "pom-pom" Mk. II anti-aircraft gun; 4 × 21 in (533 mm) torpedo tubes (2×2)

HMS Taurus was an R-class destroyer which served with the Royal Navy during World War I. Ordered from Thornycroft in 1915 and launched in 1917, the vessel operated as part of the Harwich Force until the end of hostilities. Shortly after entering service, Taurus formed part of the destroyer shield for the Royal Navy's bombardment of Ostend that successfully sank the German destroyer S20. After the War, the destroyer was reduced to the Reserve Fleet and stationed at Devonport. After a brief period of service in Ireland and appearance in the 1924 naval review, Taurus was sold to be broken up in 1930.

== Design and development ==
As the First World War progressed, the Royal Navy required more, and more modern, warships. Taurus was one of two R-class destroyers ordered by the British Admiralty from Thornycroft in December 1915 as part of the Seventh War Construction Programme alongside sister ship Teazer. The ships differed from the six preceding Thornycroft M-class built by the yard in having all geared turbines and the aft gun being raised on a bandstand.

Taurus had an overall length of 274 feet 3 inches (83.59 m) and was 265 feet (81 m) between perpendiculars. Beam was 27 ft (324.0 in) and draught 11 ft (3.4 m). Displacement was 1,035 long tons (1,052 t) normal and 1,208 long tons (1,227 t) full load. Three Yarrow boilers fed steam to two sets of Brown-Curtis geared steam turbines rated at 29,000 shaft horsepower (22,000 kW) and driving two shafts, giving a design speed of 35 knots (65 km/h; 40 mph), although Teazer achieved a class-leading speed of 40.22 knots (74.49 km/h; 46.28 mph) during trials. Three funnels were fitted, the centre one larger in diameter than the others. A total of 296 long tons (301 t) of fuel oil was carried, giving a design range of 3,450 nautical miles (6,390 km; 3,970 mi) at 20 knots (37 km/h; 23 mph).

Armament consisted of three QF 4in Mk IV guns on the ship's centreline. One was mounted on the forecastle, one aft and one between the second and third funnels. The ship also mounted a single 2-pounder (40 mm) pom-pom anti-aircraft gun for air defence and four 21 in (533 mm) torpedoes in two twin rotating mounts. The destroyer was fitted with racks and storage for depth charges. Initially, only two depth charges were carried but the number increased in service and by 1918, the vessel was carrying between 30 and 50 depth charges. The vessel had a complement of 82 officers and ratings.

== Construction and career ==
Laid down in March 1916 by Thornycroft at their shipyard in Woolston, Southampton, Taurus was launched on 10 March 1917. The vessel was named after the Taurus astrological sign and constellation. Taurus was commissioned in May 1917 and served in the Tenth Destroyer Flotilla as part of the Harwich Force.

On 4 June 1917, Taurus was deployed as part of a large group of seven cruisers and twenty five destroyers to protect the monitors Erebus and Terror in their bombardment of the German held Belgian port of Ostend. Along with sister ships Satyr, Sharpshooter and Torrent, Taurus sank the German destroyer S20. On 16 October, the ship sailed as part of a force of thirty cruisers and fifty-four destroyers searching for a German fleet that had been misidentified as being of a substantial size, despite being in reality no more than no more than ten vessels. The search did not lead to any contact.

After the Armistice of 11 November 1918 that ended the war, the Royal Navy returned to a peacetime level of strength and both the number of ships and the amount of personnel in service needed to be reduced to save money. Taurus initially remained with the Tenth Destroyer Flotilla but was reduced to the Reserve Fleet at Devonport on 16 October 1919 as a tender to the depot ship Woolwich. The destroyer was then briefly sent to serve at Queenstown, Ireland, returning to Devonport to be refitted by 26 March 1923. On 26 July 1924, the vessel participated in a naval review in front of George V. Soon afterwards, the however, the Royal Navy decided it needed to retire some of the older destroyers in the fleet to make way for newer and more capable ships. Taurus was kept at Devonport pending disposal. The vessel was sold to Metal Industries of Charleston to be broken up on 18 February 1930.

== Pennant numbers ==
Pennant number	Date
F71	January 1917
F70	January 1918
D82	January 1919
F39	November 1919
H30	January 1922
