= HMS Simoom (1918) =

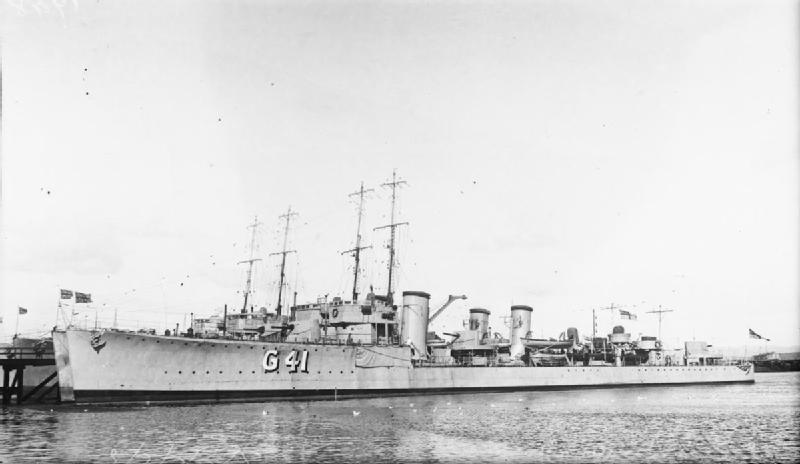
- Four S-class destroyers, sistership HMS Scimitar in the foreground

History

United Kingdom
- Name: HMS Simoom
- Namesake: Simoom
- Ordered: 17 April 1917
- Builder: John Brown & Company, Clydebank
- Yard number: 472
- Laid down: 2 July 1917
- Launched: 26 January 1918
- Commissioned: 12 March 1918
- Decommissioned: 8 January 1931
- Fate: Scrapped

General characteristics
- Class & type: S-class destroyer
- Displacement: 1,075 long tons (1,092 t) normal; 1,221 long tons (1,241 t) deep load
- Length: 265 ft (80.8 m) p.p.
- Beam: 26 ft 8 in (8.13 m)
- Draught: 9 ft 10 in (3.00 m) mean
- Propulsion: 3 Yarrow boilers; 2 geared Brown-Curtis steam turbines, 27,000 shp (20,000 kW)
- Speed: 36 knots (41.4 mph; 66.7 km/h)
- Range: 2,750 nmi (5,090 km) at 15 kn (28 km/h)
- Complement: 90
- Armament: 3 × QF 4-inch (101.6 mm) Mark IV guns, mounting P Mk. IX; 1 × single 2-pounder (40-mm) "pom-pom" Mk. II anti-aircraft gun; 4 × 21 in (533 mm) torpedo tubes (2×2); 2 x 18 in (457 mm) torpedo tubes

HMS Simoom (sometimes incorrectly spelt Simoon) was an S-class destroyer which served with the Royal Navy. Launched on 26 January 1918, the vessel operated as part of the Grand Fleet during the last months of World War I. At the end of the conflict, Simoom was placed in reserve and scrapped on 8 January 1931. The name was reused from an R-class destroyer sunk on 23 January 1917.

== Design and development ==
Simoom was ordered from John Brown & Company of Clydebank in April 1917 as the first of 24 S-class destroyers. The S class was intended as a fast 36-knot (67 km/h; 41 mph) destroyer for service that would be cheaper than the large V-class destroyers that preceded them and so able to be procured in large numbers.

The ship was 276 feet (84.12 m) long overall and 265 feet (80.77 m) between perpendiculars, with a beam of 26 feet 8 inches (8.13 m) and a draught about 9 feet 10 inches (3.00 m). Displacement was 1,075 long tons (1,092 t) standard. Three Yarrow boilers fed Brown-Curtiss single-reduction steam turbines which drove two propeller shafts. Two funnels were fitted, two boilers exhausting through the forward funnel. Peak power was 27,000 shaft horsepower (20,000 kW) at 360 rpm, giving the required 36 knot speed. A total of 301 long tons (306 t) of fuel oil could be carried, giving a range of 2,750 nautical miles (5,090 km; 3,160 mi) at 15 knots (28 km/h; 17 mph).

Simoom was armed with three 4-inch (102 mm) guns and a single 2-pounder (40 mm) "pom-pom" anti-aircraft gun. Torpedo armament was four 21-inch (533 mm) torpedo tubes in two twin rotating mounts aft and two 18-inch (457 mm) tubes mounted either side of the superstructure. Soon into service, the two smaller calibre torpedoes were removed as they proved ineffectual. Fire control included a training-only director, single Dumaresq and a Vickers range clock. The destroyer was crewed by 90 officers and ratings.

== Construction and career ==
Simoom was the fifth ship in the Royal Navy named after the simoom, a dry wind that sweeps across the Arabian peninsula. It reused the name of the similar R-class destroyer Simoom built by the same company that had been sunk in action on 23 January 1917. The ship was laid down by John Brown & Company at Clydebank on 6 August 1917 with the yard number 472 and delivered on 12 March 1918, a swift seven months. The vessel was launched on 26 January 1918. Simoom was allocated the penant number G44.

On commissioning, Simoom joined the 12th Destroyer Flotilla of the Grand Fleet at Rosyth and served there until the end of World War I. The destroyer was allocated to screen the capital ships of the fleet and participated in a trial torpedo attack on the 2nd Battle Squadron in an exercise on 19 June 1918. After the conflict, the ship was moved to the 7th Destroyer Flotilla in the Home Fleet and then reduced to reserve in February 1920. Simoom was part of the Plymouth Reserve in November 1924 when she was refitted at Pembroke Dockyard. In June 1926, Simoom relieved Strenuous as one of the emergency destroyers at Devonport. In November 1927, Simoom was in turn relieved by Romola as emergency destroyer at Devonport. Simoom was retired following the signing of the London Naval Treaty which limited total destroyer tonnage in the Navy. The destroyer was sold for scrap to Metal Industries, Limited at Charlestown on 8 January 1931.
