= George Ratcliffe (cricketer, born 1882) =

English cricketer

Another cricketer who played for Derbyshire during the 1887 season was named George Ratcliffe.

George Ratcliffe (9 November 1882 — 31 December 1949) was an English cricketer who played for Derbyshire in 1919.

Ratcliffe was born at Derby. He played his only first-class match for Derbyshire during the 1919 season against the Australian Imperial Forces. He took a wicket within the 11 balls he bowled. He was a right-handed batsman and made 8 runs in the two innings as a tailend batsman.

Ratcliffe died at Ollerton, Nottinghamshire aged 67.
