= Henry Radford =

English cricketer (1896–1972)

Henry William Radford (19 June 1896 – 29 November 1972) was an English cricketer who played for Derbyshire in 1920.

Radford was born in Derby, Derbyshire. He played three games for Derbyshire during the 1920 season, all during July. His debut was against Yorkshire when he took 2 wickets for 18 runs. He took another two wickets in his next match against Sussex, but did not strike in his last game against Somerset. Radford bowled thirty-one overs and picked up four wickets during his short time with the club. His average was 21.50 and his best performance 2 wickets for 18. He was a left-handed batsman with a top score of 14 and an average of 5.75, finishing "not out" in three of his six innings as a tailender/

Radford died 29 November 1972 in Banbury, Oxfordshire at the age of 76.

Radford's nephew was Austin Baxter, who played for Nottinghamshire between 1952 and 1953.
