= HMS Starfish (1916) =

Destroyer of the Royal Navy

History

United Kingdom
- Name: HMS Starfish
- Builder: Hawthorn Leslie, Hebburn Tyne
- Launched: 27 September 1916
- Fate: Sold, 21 April 1928

General characteristics
- Class & type: R-class destroyer
- Displacement: 975 long tons (991 t)
- Length: 276 ft (84.1 m)
- Draught: 9 ft 10 in (3.00 m)
- Propulsion: 3 boilers; 2 geared Brown Curtis steam turbines, 27,000 shp
- Speed: 36 knots (41.4 mph; 66.7 km/h)
- Range: 3,440 nmi (6,370 km) at 15 kn (28 km/h)
- Complement: 82
- Armament: 3 × QF 4-inch (101.6 mm) Mark IV guns, mounting P Mk. IX; 1 × single 2-pounder (40-mm) "pom-pom" Mk. II anti-aircraft gun; 4 × 21 in (533 mm) torpedo tubes (2×2)

HMS Starfish was an R-class destroyer which served with the Royal Navy. She was launched on 27 September 1916 and sold to be broken up on 21 April 1928. She was built by Hawthorn Leslie of Hebburn Tyne.

== Construction ==
Starfish was one of ten R-class destroyers ordered by the British Admiralty in December 1915 as part of the Seventh War Construction Programme. The ship was laid down at Hawthorn Leslie's Hebburn shipyard on 26 January 1916, launched on 27 September 1916 and completed on 16 December 1916.

Starfish was 276 feet (84.12 m) long overall, with a beam of 26 feet 6 inches (8.08 m) and a draught of 9 feet (2.74 m). Displacement was 975 long tons (991 t) normal and 1,075 long tons (1,092 t) deep load. Three Yarrow boilers fed steam to two sets of Parsons geared steam turbines rated at 27,000 shaft horsepower (20,000 kW) and driving two shafts, giving a design speed of 36 knots (67 km/h; 41 mph). Three funnels were fitted. 296 tons of oil were carried, giving a design range of 3,450 nautical miles (6,390 km; 3,970 mi) at 15 knots (28 km/h; 17 mph). Armament consisted of three QF 4in Mk IV guns on the ship's centreline, with one on the forecastle, one aft on a raised bandstand and one between the second and third funnels. A single 2-pounder (40 mm) pom-pom anti-aircraft gun, while torpedo armament consisted of four 21 inch (533 mm) torpedoes in two twin mounts. The ship had a complement of 82 officers and men.

== Service ==
On commissioning, Starfish joined the 10th Destroyer Flotilla of the Harwich Force. On the night of 23/24 January 1917, the Harwich Force was ordered to intercept a German destroyer flotilla that was being transferred from Germany to Zeebrugge, with Starfish part of a group of destroyers patrolling off the Schouwen Bank. The German destroyers ran into a cruiser division, with the destroyers V69 and G41 heavily damaged, but the Germans managed to escape, and passed Starfish's group of destroyers unobserved before reaching Zeebrugge. One German straggler, S50 encountered Starfish's group. An exchange of fire followed, in which S50 was hit several times by British shells, but G50 managed to torpedo the British destroyer Simoom, which later sank, before escaping and returning to Germany.

On the night of 4/5 June 1917, the Dover Patrol carried out a bombardment of the German held Belgian port of Ostend, using the monitors Erebus and Terror. The Harwich Force was deployed to protect the bombarding force from interference, with Starfish part of a group of cruisers and destroyers patrolling off the Thornton Bank. In October 1917, Starfish formed part of a large-scale operation, involving 30 cruisers and 54 destroyers deployed in eight groups across the North Sea in an attempt to stop a suspected sortie by German naval forces. Despite these countermeasures, the two German light cruisers Bremse and Brummer, managed to evade the patrols and attacked the regular convoy between Norway and Britain, sinking nine merchant ships and two destroyers, Mary Rose and Strongbow before returning safely to Germany.

On 4 October 1918, Starfish, along with the destroyers Montrose, Sceptre, and Sylph, sank the German armed vessels Bremerhaven and Ober Burgermeister Adickes. Starfish remained part of the 10th Destroyer Flotilla at the end of the war.

By February 1919, Starfish had transferred to the Gunnery School at the Nore, and in March was supporting the torpedo school at the Nore, while by November she had transferred to the Nore Local Defence Flotilla.

On 21 April 1928, Starfish was sold for scrap to Alloa of Charlestown.

== Pennant numbers ==
Pennant number	Date
F60	January 1917
F64	January 1918
G50	January 1919
H70	January 1922

== Bibliography ==
- Bush, Steve; Warlow, Ben (2021). Pendant Numbers of the Royal Navy: A Complete History of the Allocation of Pendant Numbers to Royal Navy Warships & Auxiliaries. Barnsley: Seaforth Publishing. ISBN 978-1-526793-78-2.
- Dittmar, F.J.; Colledge, J.J. (1972). British Warships 1914–1919. Shepperton, UK: Ian Allan. ISBN 0-7110-0380-7.
- Friedman, Norman (2009). British Destroyers: From Earliest Days to the First World War. Barnsley, UK: Seaforth Publishing. ISBN 978-1-84832-049-9.
- Gardiner, Robert; Gray, Randal, eds. (1985). Conway's All the World's Fighting Ships 1906–1921. London: Conway Maritime Press. ISBN 0-85177-245-5.
- Karau, Mark K. (2014). The Naval Flank of the Western Front: The German MarineKorps Flandern 1914–1918. Barnsley, UK: Seaforth Publishing. ISBN 978-1-84832-231-8.
- Newbolt, Henry (1928). History of the Great War: Naval Operations: Volume IV. London: Longmans, Green & Co.
