= William Malthouse =

English cricketer (1890–1961)

William Norman Malthouse (16 December 1890 – 10 May 1961) was an English cricketer who played for Derbyshire County Cricket Club in 1919 and 1920.

== Biography ==
Malthouse was born at Whitwell, Derbyshire, the son of Samuel Malthouse who had also played for Derbyshire. He played his debut for Derbyshire in the 1919 season in a match against Australian Imperial Forces, which was the only match he played that the county won. In the same year he played two county championship matches against Somerset and Nottinghamshire as a steady middle order batsman. He played four matches in the 1920 season, one of Derbyshire's worst seasons.

Malthouse was a right-hand batsman who played 13 innings in 7 first-class matches, with a top score of 30 and an average of 9.66. He was a right-arm off-break bowler but collected no wickets in the 114 balls he bowled.

Malthouse appears to have run a photography business at Whitwell He died at South Kirkby, Yorkshire at the age of 70.
