= Gerry Hill =

English cricketer

Personal information
- Full name: Gerald Hill
- Born: 15 April 1913; Totton, Hampshire, England
- Died: 31 January 2006 (aged 92); Lyndhurst, Hampshire, England
- Batting: Right-handed
- Bowling: Right-arm offbreak

Domestic team information
- Years: Team
- 1932–1954: Hampshire

Career statistics
Competition	FC
Matches	371
Runs scored	9,085
Batting average	18.13
100s/50s	4/28
Top score	161
Balls bowled	44,356
Wickets	617
Bowling average	29.92
5 wickets in innings	18
10 wickets in match	3
Best bowling	8/62
Catches/stumpings	169/–
- Source: Cricinfo, 5 October 2009

Gerald Hill (15 April 1913 – 31 January 2006) was an English first-class cricketer who played for Hampshire from 1932 to 1954. A right-handed batsman and right-arm off break bowler, Hill played 371 first-class games for Hampshire. Hill was spotted by the cricketer and writer Sir Arthur Conan Doyle. Doyle was playing golf with Hill's father when he spotted the young Hill playing on an adjoining pitch. Doyle then wrote to Colonel J. G. Greig, Hampshire's secretary, to arrange a trial.

It was speculated that he could become an all-round successor to Alec Kennedy, who had retired following the 1934 season.

In 1935, Hill was hit for 32 in an over by Glamorgan's Cyril Smart (6, 6, 4, 6, 6, 4), then the most expensive six-ball over in first-class history. In 1937, during a County Championship match played against Sussex at the United Services Recreation Ground, Hill and Donald Walker put on 235 for the 5th wicket, which remains to this day a Hampshire record.

Kent captain Percy Chapman, a family friend of Hill's, presented him with his County Cap in 1935. Hill was accidentally shot in the leg by teammate Len Creese, while bowling in the nets; the bullet stayed in Hill's leg for the remainder of his life. Hill would endearingly describe Creese as being "as mad as a hatter".

Hill fought in the Second World War in Italy and resumed his first-class career with Hampshire after the resumption of the County Championship in 1946. Hill retired from first-class cricket in 1954. Hill batted in all 11 positions for Hampshire scoring four centuries, including a highest score of 161 against Sussex at Portsmouth.

Hill died in his sleep at his home at Lyndhurst in the New Forest on 31 January 2006.
