= Arthur Severn =

English cricketer

Personal information
- Born: 23 June 1893; Alfreton, Derbyshire, England
- Died: 10 January 1949 (aged 55); Stainforth, Yorkshire, England
- Batting: Right-handed

Domestic team information
- Years: Team
- 1919–1920: Derbyshire
- FC debut: 19 May 1919 Derbyshire v Lancashire
- Last FC: 23 June 1920 Derbyshire v Lancashire

Career statistics
Competition	First-class
Matches	13
Runs scored	341
Batting average	15.50
100s/50s	0/2
Top score	73
Catches/stumpings	5/–
- Source: CricketArchive, November 2011

Arthur Severn (23 June 1893 – 10 January 1949) was an English cricketer who played first-class cricket for Derbyshire in 1919 and 1920.

Severn was born at Alfreton, Derbyshire. He joined the nursery staff at Derby in 1914, but in the First World War served with the Coldstream Guards. He made his debut for Derbyshire in the 1919 season against Lancashire in May. In his second match against Leicestershire, opening the batting with Leonard Oliver, he made his top score of 73 in a game Derbyshire won by 9 wickets. Subsequently, as his performance failed to live up to his initial promise, he found himself slipping down the batting order as the season progressed. He played three matches at the start of the 1920 season before he severed his connection with Derbyshire and went to live at Stainforth, near Doncaster.

Severn played 24 innings in 13 first-class matches with a top score of 73 and an average of 15.50.

Severn died at Stainforth at the age of 55.
