= HMS Sharpshooter (1917) =

Destroyer of the Royal Navy

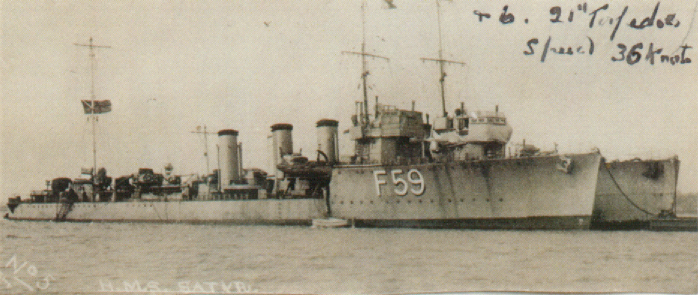
- 1918 post card of two R-class destroyers, sistership HMS Satyr to the fore

History

United Kingdom
- Name: HMS Sharpshooter
- Builder: William Beardmore and Company, Dalmuir
- Yard number: 550
- Laid down: May 1916
- Launched: 27 February 1917
- Commissioned: 2 April 1917
- Decommissioned: 29 April 1927
- Fate: Sold for scrapping

General characteristics
- Class & type: R-class destroyer
- Displacement: 1,065 long tons (1,082 t) normal
- Length: 276 ft (84.1 m)
- Beam: 26 ft 6 in (8.1 m)
- Draught: 9 ft (2.7 m)
- Propulsion: 3 Yarrow boilers; 2 geared Parsons steam turbines, 27,000 shp (20,000 kW)
- Speed: 36 knots (41.4 mph; 66.7 km/h)
- Range: 3,440 nmi (6,370 km) at 15 kn (28 km/h)
- Complement: 82
- Armament: 3 × QF 4-inch (101.6 mm) Mark IV guns, mounting P Mk. IX; 1 × single 2-pounder (40-mm) "pom-pom" Mk. II anti-aircraft gun; 4 × 21 in (533 mm) torpedo tubes (2×2)

HMS Sharpshooter was an R-class destroyer which served with the Royal Navy during World War I. Launched on 27 February 1917, the ship joined the Harwich Force, undertaking convoy escort duties. The vessel also took part in the Navy’s bombardment of Ostend later that year. On 1 June 1918, the destroyer rescued Captain A. C. Sharwood, one of the first pilots of the Royal Australian Navy, who ditched his Sopwith 2F.1 Camel nearby. After the war, Sharpshooter joined the Navy gunnery training establishment at Plymouth, but did not stay long and was reduced to Reduced Complement on 5 March 1919. The Royal Navy was rationalising its destroyer force and Sharpshooter, deemed superfluous, was sold to be broken up on 29 April 1927.

== Design and development ==
Sharpshooter was one of ten R-class destroyers ordered by the British Admiralty in December 1915 as part of the Seventh War Construction Programme. The design was based on the preceding M-class and differed primarily in utilising geared steam turbines to improve fuel consumption.

Sharpshooter was 276 feet (84.12 m) long overall, with a beam of 26 feet 6 inches (8.08 m) and a draught of 9 feet (2.74 m). Displacement was approximately 1,065 long tons (1,082 t) normal. Power was provided by three Yarrow boilers feeding two Parsons geared steam turbines rated at 27,000 shaft horsepower (20,000 kW) and driving two shafts, to give a design speed of 36 knots (67 km/h; 41 mph). Three funnels were fitted. A total of 296 long tons (301 t) of fuel oil was carried, giving a design range of 3,450 nautical miles (6,390 km; 3,970 mi) at 15 knots (28 km/h; 17 mph).

Armament consisted of three QF 4in Mk IV guns on the ship's centreline, with one on the forecastle, one aft on a raised platform and one between the second and third funnels. A single 2-pounder (40 mm) pom-pom anti-aircraft gun was carried, while torpedo armament consisted of two twin mounts for 21 in (533 mm) torpedoes. The ship had a complement of 82 officers and ratings.

== Construction and career ==
Sharpshooter was laid down at the William Beardmore and Company shipyard in Dalmuir during May 1916 with the yard number 550 at a contract price of £170,722. The vessel was launched in December 1916 and completed in February 1917.

On commissioning, Sharpshooter joined the 10th Destroyer Flotilla of the Harwich Force. The destroyer was engaged in escort duties and, on 9 April, was accompanying a convoy travelling east from the Netherlands when it was attacked by the German submarine UB-31. The submarine successfully sank one of the merchant ships, but before it could unleash another torpedo, Sharpshooter saw the track made by the wake and, following it, rushed upon the submarine, dropping three depth charges and scaring it away.

On 4 June 1917, Sharpshooter was deployed as part of a large group of seven cruisers and twenty-five destroyers to protect the monitors Erebus and Terror in their bombardment of the German held Belgian port of Ostend. At 2:30 in the morning of 5 June, the destroyer was part of a flotilla of four cruisers and nine destroyers that were patrolling off Thornton Bank when they spotted the German destroyers S15 and S20. A vigorous battle ensued, during which a torpedo narrowly missed Sharpshooter, passing astern. Along with Satyr, Taurus and Torrent, Sharpshooter damaged S15 and sank S20. The flotilla subsequently undertook anti-submarine patrols, but the destroyer did not sight an enemy boat. The rest of the war was uneventful apart from 1 June 1918 when the destroyer rescued one of the first pilots of the Royal Australian Navy, Captain A. C. Sharwood, who ditched his Sopwith 2F.1 Camel, operated from Sydney, nearby.

Sharpshooter remained part of the 10th Destroyer Flotilla at the end of the war. After the conflict, the ship was transferred to the Gunnery School at Portsmouth and, on 5 March 1919, was reduced to Reduced Complement. In 1923, the Navy decided to scrap many of the older destroyers in preparation for the introduction of newer and larger vessels. Sharpshooter was sold for scrap to Thos. W. Ward at Briton Ferry on 29 April 1927.

== Pennant numbers ==
Pennant number	Date
F48	January 1917
F61	January 1918
