= Donald Walker (cricketer) =

English cricketer (1912–1941)

Personal information
- Full name: Donald Fezard Walker
- Born: 15 August 1912; Wandsworth, London, England
- Died: 18 June 1941 (aged 28) near Best, German-occupied Netherlands
- Batting: Left-handed
- Bowling: Unknown
- Role: Occasional wicket-keeper

Domestic team information
- Years: Team
- 1937–1939: Hampshire

Career statistics
Competition	First-class
Matches	73
Runs scored	3,004
Batting average	26.12
100s/50s	4/15
Top score	147
Balls bowled	18
Wickets	0
Bowling average	–
5 wickets in innings	–
10 wickets in match	–
Best bowling	–
Catches/stumpings	75/1
- Source: Cricinfo, 5 October 2009

Donald Fezard Walker (15 August 1912 — 18 June 1941) was an English first-class cricketer and an officer in the Royal Air Force Volunteer Reserve during the Second World War. As a professional cricketer Hampshire, he made over seventy appearances in first-class cricket and scored just over 3,000 runs.

== Early life and cricket career ==
The son of James Fezard Walker and his wife, Ethel, he was born in Wandsworth in August 1912. He was educated at King's College School in Wimbledon, London. As a schoolboy cricketer, he excelled as a bowler and fielder, and was given a trial by Surrey in 1933. After scoring 1,000 runs and taking 100 wickets in a season in club cricket, Walker was later approached by Hampshire, who persuaded him to pursue a career as a professional cricketer. He made his debut in first-class cricket for Hampshire against Lancashire at Old Trafford in the 1937 County Championship. Walker made 24 first-class appearances in his debut season, scoring 930 runs at an average of 25.83; he scored his maiden century during the season against Sussex at Portsmouth, when he made 123 runs; this innings was notable for it formed part of a 235 runs partnership for the fifth wicket with Gerry Hill (161 runs), which remained a Hampshire record for that wicket until 2022, when it was broken by Liam Dawson and Ben Brown's partnership of 273 against Kent.

The following season, Walker made 23 first-class appearances, scoring 925 runs at an average of 23.71, though he did not record any centuries. In 1939, he made 26 first-class appearances and passed a thousand runs for the season, with 1,149 at an average of 28.72; he made three centuries during the season, with his highest score of 147 coming against Nottinghamshire at Trent Bridge, with Walker top-scoring in Hampshire's first innings of 296 all out. The outbreak of the Second World War at the beginning of September 1939 bought first-class cricket, and unbeknownst to Walker, his cricket career to an abrupt end. Described by Wisden as "sound in defence, with unlimited patience" who demonstrated "good strokes all round the wicket", he scored 3,004 runs from 73 first-class matches for Hampshire, at an average of 26.12; he made four centuries and fifteen half centuries. A capable fielder who occasionally kept-wicket, he took 75 catches.

Alongside playing cricket, Walker played rugby union, he captained the Dorset county team, and also captained a Royal Air Force side during the war.

== WWII service and death ==
With the onset of the war, Walker joined the Royal Air Force Volunteer Reserve, being commissioned as a pilot officer on probation in September 1940, and was assigned to No. 58 Squadron to fly Armstrong Whitworth Whitley bombers as part of Bomber Command. On 17 June 1941, Walker took off from RAF Linton-on-Ouse as the pilot of Whitley Mark V bomber N1462 to conduct a bombing raid on Cologne. On the Whitley's way back to base, the bomber was spotted by search lights, and Oberleutnant Wolfgang Thimmig was scrambled from Venlo Airfield to intercept the bomber. The Whitley was shot down over the German-occupied Netherlands at 02:34 hours on 18 June near Best. The kill was claimed by Thimmig's Messerschmitt Bf 110, his first victory. Four out of the five on board the aircraft were killed, including Walker. The sole survivor was captured with wounds to both legs and sent to a German prisoner-of-war camp. Walker and his crew are buried at Eindhoven General Cemetery.
