= Harry Smith (cricketer, born 1886) =

English colliery manager and cricketer

Harry Watson Smith (30 September 1886 – 24 June 1955) was an English colliery manager and cricketer who played for Warwickshire in 1912 and for Derbyshire in 1920.

Smith was born in Chesterfield, Derbyshire and was educated at Worksop College and Sheffield University. He became a Member of the Institution of Mechanical Engineers, and a Member of the Institution of Civil Engineers. He was manager at Ansley Hall Colliery, Warwickshire.

Smith made his first-class cricket debut for Warwickshire in 1912, when he appeared in one match against Derbyshire, in which he kept wicket and scored 15 runs in the lower order. Smith's second and final County match was for Derbyshire, in a match in the 1920 season against Somerset Though he was dismissed cheaply in the first innings, he made a career-best 24 not out in the second. He was a right-handed batsman and wicket-keeper and played three innings in two first-class matches making 49 runs with a top score of 24 not out.

Smith held positions as manager of Denaby Main Colliery and General Manager of Glass Houghton and Castleford Collieries, Whitehaven Colliery Co. Ltd. and of the Sheffield Coal Company Ltd. In 1936 he was appointed General Manager of the Hardwick Colliery Company and the Hardwick By-Product Company. He became deputy chairman and managing director of both Companies. He was a Director and Consultant to the Chislet Colliery, and deputy chairman and Collieries Advisor of the Lilleshall Company'. In 1942, he visited the US for the Government to investigate American mining methods. In 1945 he was a Member of the Technical Advisory Committee on Coal Mining to the Ministry of Fuel and Power and was also a member of the Mechanisation Advisory Committee to the Ministry. He was a member of the executive committee of the British Coking Industry Association and other National Committees of the Coking Industry. In 1945 and 1946, he was President of the Midland Institute of Mining Engineers. After nationalisation he was Production Director for the East Midland Division of the National Coal Board. He was a Fellow of the Geological Society of London and a J.P. He lived at "The Cedars," Tibshelf, Derbyshire.

Smith died in Ruthin, Denbighshire at the age of 68.
