= Cyril Smart =

English cricketer

Personal information
- Full name: Cyril Cecil Smart
- Born: 23 July 1898; Lacock, Wiltshire, England
- Died: 21 May 1975 (aged 76); Abertillery, Monmouthshire, Wales
- Batting: Right-handed
- Bowling: Legbreak

Domestic team information
- Years: Team
- 1920–1922: Warwickshire
- 1927–1946: Glamorgan

Career statistics
Competition	First-class
Matches	236
Runs scored	8,992
Batting average	26.68
100s/50s	9/48
Top score	151*
Balls bowled	13,736
Wickets	180
Bowling average	41.69
5 wickets in innings	1
10 wickets in match	0
Best bowling	5/39
Catches/stumpings	163/–
- Source: CricInfo, 25 May 2013

Cyril Cecil Smart (23 July 1898 – 21 May 1975) was an English cricketer who played for Glamorgan and Warwickshire County Cricket Clubs between 1920 and 1946, featuring in 236 first-class cricket matches as a right-handed batsman and occasional leg-break spin bowler. Smart, whose brother Jack was also a first-class cricketer and a Test match umpire, was considered by Wisden to be one of the "most explosive county batsmen" during the 1930s, and is well known for his then-world record hitting of thirty-two runs from a single over against Hampshire. He ended his career with the record number of sixes for any Glamorgan player at the time.

Smart, whose father also played cricket for Wiltshire, played sporadically for Warwickshire between 1920 and 1922, but found little success. After being away from cricket for five years he returned by playing for Glamorgan from 1927 onwards, however again only featured occasionally. However, in 1934 he played a full season, scoring over 1,000 runs – a landmark he would then go on to consistently achieve until the outbreak of the Second World War, as well as breaking the world record for runs scored from off one single over, and club records for partnerships and six-hitting. After the war he returned for one final season, however reaped little reward and left the game.

== Early life ==
Smart was born in Lacock, Wiltshire in July 1898, younger brother of Jack Smart who was born in 1891. Their father, Thomas Smart, was a keen cricketer who played for Wiltshire in the Minor Counties Championship between 1895 and 1907.

== Playing career ==
=== Warwickshire ===
Smart began his playing career for Warwickshire in 1920. He made his debut facing Surrey at the Kennington Oval on 8 May, scoring nine and a duck and bowling thirteen wicketless overs. He featured in thirteen games in total that season, managing a single half-century with the bat and taking only four wickets at a bowling average of above 60 runs per wicket. He was nevertheless retained for the next two seasons, managing 400 runs in the 1921 season with another half-century, and a further 247 in 1922, however he would only take five more wickets across those two years.

=== Glamorgan ===
In 1927 Smart, who had played only one first-class match since leaving Warwickshire – an invitational game in 1926 – returned to the County Championship for Glamorgan and would feature for them intermittently over the next few years, making little impression with ball or bat. However, in 1934 – having played at the most only four or five matches per season since his debut for them – Glamorgan played Smart for the full 27 games of the summer. He scored 1,335 runs, including a maiden century and nine fifties, and took 38 wickets. He went on to score over 1000 runs for three further seasons, 1935, 1936 and 1937, taking regular wickets with his part-time spin bowling.

In the 1935 season, Smart, rapidly gaining his reputation as an explosive hitter, hit six, six, four, six, six, four off of an over from Hampshire's Gerry Hill at the Cardiff Arms Park.

He scored three centuries in 1935 – including one against a touring South African side – and two more in 1936. His century against that touring South African side formed part of a record partnership for the final wicket: he made 131 while batting with the tail. During his innings he lofted a six that smashed a window in a nearby hotel. He narrowly missed out on 1,000 runs in 1938, ending the season with 933 runs, but he scored 1,241 in 1939. With the outbreak of World War II, cricket in England was put on hold, and though Smart returned to cricket in nine matches in the 1946 season he failed to pass fifty and did not play again after July.

== Retirement and later life ==
Smart remained in South Wales for the rest of his life, dying in 1975 in Abertillery.
