= John Dunlop Southern =

English cricketer and Royal Navy officer

John Dunlop Southern (5 November 1899 – 7 February 1972) was a Royal Navy officer and cricketer who played first-class cricket for Derbyshire in occasional games between 1919 and 1934.

Southern was born at Friar Gate, Derby. He made his debut for Derbyshire in a match against Australian Imperial Forces, scoring 43 in his second innings. In 1920 he played two matches – against Sussex and Leicestershire – and in 1922 one match against Worcestershire. After a break on naval service he reappeared for Derbyshire for one game in 1934 against Hampshire. He was a right-hand batsman and played 10 innings in 5 matches with a top score of 43 and an average of 9.5.

Southern became a naval lieutenant in 1923 and lieutenant-commander in 1931. In 1938 he was posted to HMS Pembroke, the Royal Navy base at Chatham, for training duties. He was then executive officer on HMS Attacker, an escort carrier. He officially retired in 1943 but became acting commander and was later assigned to HMS Valkyrie, an RDF training establishment at Camp Douglas, on the Isle of Man. He was then in the Naval Training Department at the Admiralty, HMS President. He retired fully in April 1946.

Southern retired to Seend Head House, Seend, near Melksham, Wiltshire where he died aged 73.
