= Allen Turner (cricketer) =

English cricketer

Allen Turner (24 October 1891 – 7 January 1961) was an English cricketer who played first-class cricket for Derbyshire in 1920.

Turner was born in Heath, Derbyshire. Turner made just two appearances for Derbyshire in the 1920 season, both in August. In his first match against Leicestershire, he took a wicket and a catch and scored two runs in both innings. In the second game against Nottinghamshire he took a total of 5 wickets with a first innings tally of 3 for 66 but did not score a run. Turner was a right-arm medium-fast bowler and took 6 wickets in his two matches with an average of 23 and a best performance of 3 for 66. He was a right-handed batsman and scored a total of 4 runs in 4 innings.

Turner died in Holmewood, Derbyshire, at the age of 69.
