= Hubert de Burgh (cricketer) =

Irish cricketer and Royal Navy officer (1879–1960)

Personal information
- Full name: Hubert Henry de Burgh
- Born: 16 February 1879; Naas, County Kildare, Ireland
- Died: 6 October 1960 (aged 81); Naas, County Kildare, Ireland
- Batting: Right-handed

Domestic team information
- Years: Team
- 1905/06: Europeans

Career statistics
Competition	First-class
Matches	2
Runs scored	39
Batting average	13.00
100s/50s	–/–
Top score	28
Catches/stumpings	–/–
- Source: ESPNcricinfo, 1 January 2022
- Military career
- Allegiance: United Kingdom
- Branch: Royal Navy
- Service years: 1893–1923; 1939–1945
- Rank: Lieutenant (1903); Captain (1917)

Captain Hubert Henry de Burgh, DSO (English: /dəˈbɜːr/ də-BUR; 16 February 1879 – 6 October 1960) was an Irish cricketer and Officer in the Royal Navy.

== Background ==
Captain de Burgh was the eldest son of Colonel Thomas John de Burgh, DL, JP of Oldtown, Naas, County Kildare (1851–1931)and Emily, daughter of Baron de Robeck. He was the brother of Captain Charles de Burgh DSO, RN, a submarine commander and Lieutenant Tom de Burgh of the 31st Duke of Connaught's Own Lancers who was killed in action in 1914.

The de Burghs of Oldtown have been at Oldtown since the house was built by Colonel Thomas de Burgh, architect of Trinity College Dublin Library, The Custom House, The Royal Barracks and St Steven's Hospital in Dublin. Hubert de Burgh and his descendants are direct descendants of William de Burgh who first settled in Ireland in 1185.

== Career ==
Commissioned into the Royal Navy in 1893, Hubert de Burgh was posted as a lieutenant to HMS Britannia in January 1903. He served in India as Aide de Camp (ADC) to the King at the Delhi Durbar in 1911 and in St Petersburg. During the Great War he commanded destroyers and was made a Companion of the Distinguished Service Order for bravery at sea in 1917 as well as being twice mentioned in despatches. After commanding the Admiralty Yacht and serving in the Mediterranean, Captain de Burgh retired in 1923 until he re-joined the Royal Navy in 1939.

== Cricket ==
Early in his life, de Burgh played a first-class match in India for a "Europeans" team against a Hindus team in February 1906. A right-handed batsman, he played just once for the Ireland national cricket team, a first-class match against Oxford University in June 1926.
