= HMS Setter =

British R-Class destroyer, WW1

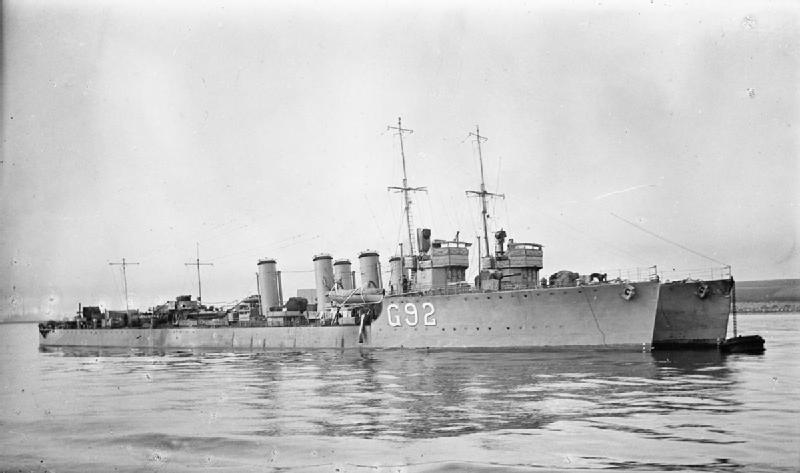
- Two R-class destroyers, sister ship HMS Rob Roy nearest

History

United Kingdom
- Name: HMS Setter
- Ordered: July 1915
- Builder: J. Samuel White, East Cowes
- Yard number: 1478
- Launched: 18 August 1916
- Completed: 12 February 1917
- Decommissioned: 17 May 1917
- Fate: Sank after collision with HMS Sylph

General characteristics
- Class & type: R-class destroyer
- Displacement: 975 long tons (991 t) (normal); 1,173 long tons (1,192 t) (deep load)
- Length: 276 ft (84.1 m) (o.a.)
- Beam: 26 ft 8 in (8.13 m)
- Draught: 9 ft (2.7 m)
- Installed power: 3 Yarrow boilers; 27,000 shp (20,000 kW)
- Propulsion: 2 geared Parsons steam turbines
- Speed: 36 knots (66.7 km/h; 41.4 mph)
- Range: 3,450 nmi (6,390 km; 3,970 mi) at 15 knots (28 km/h; 17 mph)
- Complement: 82
- Armament: 3 × QF 4 in (102 mm) Mark IV guns; 1 × single 2-pdr (40 mm) "pom-pom" Mk. II anti-aircraft gun; 4 × 21 in (533 mm) torpedo tubes (2×2)

HMS Setter was an R-class destroyer which served with the Royal Navy during the First World War. The R class were an improvement on the previous M class with geared steam turbines to improve efficiency. Laid down by J. Samuel White at East Cowes on the Isle of Wight, the destroyer was launched on 18 August 1916 and joined the Harwich Force. The ship escorted merchant vessels that travelled between the United Kingdom and the Netherlands as part of a small flotilla of destroyers. The convoys were subject to attack from German warships, but Setter was never hit by enemy attack. Instead, during the foggy night of 17 May 1917, the destroyer was struck by sister ship Sylph, leader of the small flotilla. The damage was critical and the crew were evacuated to Sylph as Setter sank with no loss of life.

== Design and development ==
Setter was one of seventeen R-class destroyer delivered to the British Admiralty as part of the Sixth War Construction Programme. The design was generally similar to the preceding M class, but differed in having geared steam turbines, the aft gun mounted on a raised platform and minor changes to improve seakeeping. The destroyer had an overall length of 276 feet (84.12 m), with a beam of 26 feet 8 inches (8.13 m) and a draught of 9 feet (2.74 m). Displacement was 975 long tons (991 t) normal and 1,173 long tons (1,192 t) deep load. Power was provided by three Yarrow boilers feeding two Parsons geared turbines rated at 27,000 shaft horsepower (20,000 kW) and driving two shafts, to give a design speed of 36 knots (67 km/h; 41 mph).

Three funnels were fitted. A total of 296 long tons (301 t) of fuel oil was carried, giving a design range of 3,450 nautical miles (6,390 km; 3,970 mi) at 15 knots (28 km/h; 17 mph) due to the enhanced efficiency of the geared machinery. The ship had a complement of 82 officers and ratings.

Armament consisted of three 4-inch (102 mm) Mk IV QF guns on the ship's centreline, with one on the forecastle, one aft and one between the second and third funnels. A single 2-pounder (40 mm) pom-pom anti-aircraft gun was carried on a platform between two twin mounts for 21 in (533 mm) torpedoes.

== Construction and career ==
Ordered in July 1915, Setter was laid down by J. Samuel White at East Cowes on the Isle of Wight with the yard number 1478, and launched on 18 August the following year. The destroyer was completed on 12 February 1917 and was deployed as part of the Harwich Force, joining the Tenth Destroyer Flotilla. The ship escorted merchant ships that crossed between the Netherlands and the United Kingdom, termed Dutch traffic, which usually involved a flotilla leader and four destroyers steaming almost every alternate day. It was during one of these operations on 12 March that the flotilla was attacked by German torpedo boats. Setter was undamaged, but sister ship Skate was struck by a torpedo, although damage was minor and all the ships returned to Harwich.

On 17 May, while escorting Dutch traffic, Setter was once again part of a flotilla that encountered German torpedo boats. The ships, led by sister ship Sylph and including Minos and Recruit as well as Setter, were covering the rear of the convoy when they saw approaching ships. As the weather was foggy, it was assumed that they were members of the convoy until German voices were heard and a torpedo and three salvoes were fired by the German ships. The attack was possibly launched from the V25-class torpedo boats V71 and G81, although in the confusion of battle it is unclear which members of either the German 3rd Torpedo-Boat Flotilla or the Zeebrugge Half Flotilla were involved as both were deployed against the traffic on the route that night. The torpedo narrowly missed Sylph and the ships lost sight of each other. In the confusion, Setter had to turn sharply to port with engines at full power astern to avoid hitting Recruit. Unfortunately, the manoeuvre put the destroyer straight in front of Sylph, which hit the starboard quarter and caused the engine room to flood. Despite attempts to save the ship, Setter was lost. The crew boarded Sylph and, one hour and twenty minutes after being rammed, the ship sank. One merchant ship from the convoy, SS Cito, was sunk by the German warships. There were no casualties aboard Setter.

== Pennant numbers ==
Pennant number	Date
G98	1916
F55	January 1917
