= Jack Smart (cricketer) =

English cricketer and Test match umpire

John Abbotts (or Abbott) Smart (12 April 1891 – 3 October 1979) was an English first-class cricketer and Test match umpire.

Smart was born in Forest Hill near Marlborough in Wiltshire, into a cricketing family. His father was a professional cricketer for Wiltshire; and his brother Cyril Smart played first-class cricket for Warwickshire and Glamorgan, who set a world record in 1935 by hitting 32 runs off one over. Two other brothers played as professionals at clubs in Wales.

Smart worked as a miner before becoming a professional county cricketer. He played Minor Counties cricket for Wiltshire from 1910 to 1912, and made his first-class cricket debut for Warwickshire in 1919, playing alongside his brother Cyril from 1920 to 1922. He became a regular fixture in the Warwickshire side from 1920, playing 238 games in all. He began as an attacking batsman and occasional off break bowler, but became the team's wicket-keeper after the retirement of Tiger Smith in 1930, catching 317 victims while standing behind the stumps and stumping 105 (in addition to 77 catches as an outfielder). He made 79 dismissals in 1932, a then county record which was bettered by Geoff Humpage in 1985. He scored a total of 3,425 runs in 340 innings, at the relatively low batting average of 11.53, including 9 half-centuries (four in 1923), and a high score of 68 not out against Worcestershire in 1922. He took 22 wickets at a bowling average of 57.36, with best bowling of 3/31 against Northamptonshire in 1922.

He played his last first-class cricket in 1936, and turned to umpiring the following year. He umpired 4 Test matches, all played in England, two involving India in 1946 and two South Africa in 1947.

He made his debut as a Test umpire in the 1st Test against India at Lord's in June 1946, standing with Herbert Baldwin. His second Test as umpire was the 3rd Test that August, at the Oval, which was spoiled by rain. He also umpired the high-scoring but drawn 1st and 5th Tests against South Africa in 1947, at Trent Bridge and the Oval.

He finally retired in 1948. He died in Bulkington, near Nuneaton, in Warwickshire.
