= William Victor Fox =

English sportsman

William Fox
Personal information
- Full name: William Victor Fox
- Born: 8 January 1898; Middlesbrough, England
- Died: 17 February 1949 (aged 51); Withington, Manchester, England

Domestic team information
- Years: Team
- 1923–1932: Worcestershire

Career statistics
| Competition | FC |
|---|---|
| Matches | 163 |
| Runs scored | 6,654 |
| Batting average | 26.61 |
| 100s/50s | 11/26 |
| Top score | 198 |
| Balls bowled | 209 |
| Wickets | 2 |
| Bowling average | 68.50 |
| 5 wickets in innings | 0 |
| 10 wickets in match | 0 |
| Best bowling | 1–13 |
| Catches/stumpings | 89/0 |
- Source: CricketArchive, 1 August 2008

William Victor Fox (8 January 1898 – 17 February 1949) was an English sportsman who played both cricket and football to a high level.

== Cricket ==
Fox made his first-class debut for Worcestershire in May 1923, making 5 and 7 in an innings defeat against Hampshire at Southampton. However, thereafter he contributed some useful innings throughout the season and ended not far short of a thousand runs, including his maiden century, an unbeaten 178 against Northamptonshire. His average that summer was a useful 32.70, but his career came to an enforced (though temporary) end at the end of the season when Marylebone Cricket Club (MCC) ruled that his qualification was invalid.

Fox's cricketing career resumed in 1926, and from then until 1930 he was a regular in the Worcestershire team. In a usually weak batting side, Fox performed well, making his thousand runs in 1926, 1928 and 1929, and missing out by a single run in 1927. His best season was 1929; in this year he made 1,457 first-class runs at an average of 31, with two hundreds and seven fifties. It was in 1929 also that Fox hit his career-best innings: 198 against Warwickshire at Edgbaston.

His form fell away in 1930, and after hitting 134 against Lancashire at the start of July Fox made only one further half-century in 15 innings that year. He played not at all in 1931, and although he appeared four times in 1932 he did nothing of any note in those games.

He was a strictly occasional bowler, sending down fewer than 35 overs in his career and claiming just two first-class wickets. His victims were both substantial cricketers: Yorkshire's George Macaulay in 1926 and Leicestershire's Alan Shipman in 1929.

Fox died at the early age of 51 following an operation, leaving Mrs Frances Vera Fox and son Kenneth Fox.

== Football ==
Fox played football for Middlesbrough, Wolves and Newport County.
