= Allen Turner (footballer) =

Australian rules footballer, born 1913

Personal information
- Full name: Allen Turner
- Born: 20 September 1913
- Died: 20 March 2009 (aged 95)
- Height: 173 cm (5 ft 8 in)
- Weight: 70 kg (154 lb)

Playing career^{1}
Years	Club	Games (Goals)
1938–1939	North Melbourne	6 (4)
- ^{1} Playing statistics correct to the end of 1939.

Allen Turner (20 September 1913 – 20 March 2009) was an Australian rules footballer who played for the North Melbourne Football Club in the Victorian Football League (VFL).
