= HMS Valkyrie (1917) =

Destroyer of the Royal Navy

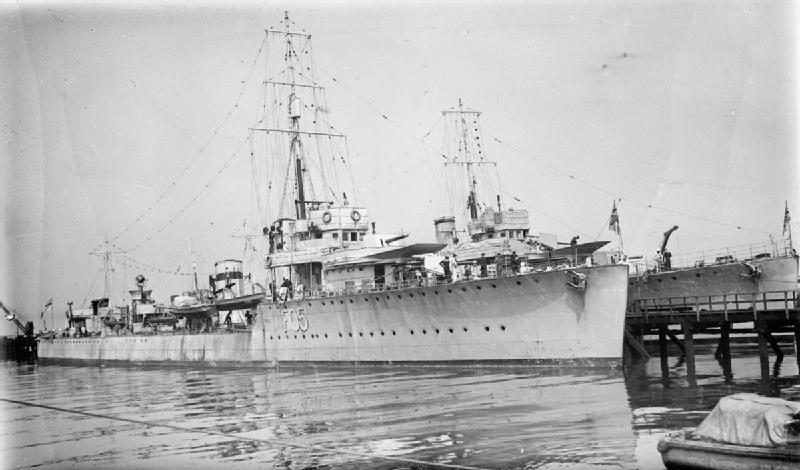

History

United Kingdom
- Name: HMS Valkyrie
- Namesake: The valkyries of Norse mythology
- Ordered: July 1916
- Builder: Denny
- Laid down: 25 May 1916
- Launched: 13 March 1917
- Commissioned: 16 June 1917
- Identification: Pennant number F05/D61
- Fate: Scrapped in 1936

General characteristics
- Class & type: Admiralty V-class flotilla leader
- Displacement: 1,188 tons standard; 1,400 tons full
- Length: 300 ft (91 m)
- Beam: 26 ft 9 in (8.15 m)
- Draught: 9 ft (2.7 m)
- Propulsion: 3 Yarrow-type Water-tube boilers, Brown-Curtis steam turbines, 2 shafts, 27,500 shp (20,500 kW)
- Speed: 34 knots (63 km/h)
- Range: 320-370 tons oil; 3,500 nmi (6,480 km) at 15 kn (28 km/h); 900 nmi (1,670 km) at 32 kn (59 km/h)
- Complement: 115
- Armament: 4 × QF 4-inch (101.6 mm) Mk V L/45 guns; 1 QF 3-inch (76.20 mm)20 cwt anti-aircraft gun; 4 × 21-inch Torpedo Tubes

HMS Valkyrie was a First World War V-class flotilla leader of the Royal Navy. She was one of two destroyers ordered in July 1916 from William Denny & Bros. Ltd shipyard under the 9th Order for Destroyers of the Emergency War Program of 1916–17. She was originally to be called HMS Malcolm but was renamed before being completed. The name Malcolm was later assigned to another destroyer leader.

== Construction ==
In early 1916, the Director of Naval Construction prepared a design for a destroyer leader suitable to lead the new R-class destroyers. The first two ships of the new class, Malcolm and Montrose were ordered from William Denny and Brothers in April 1916, with three more being ordered from other builders in July that year. Malcolm's keel was laid on 25 May 1916 at Denny's shipyard in Dumbarton, Scotland. The five V-class leaders were renamed on 28 September 1916, with Malcolm being renamed Valkyrie and Montrose being renamed Valorous. She was launched on 13 March 1917.

Valkyrie was 312 feet (95.10 m) long overall with a beam of 29 feet 6 inches (8.99 m) and a draught of between 10 feet 8 inches (3.25 m) and 11 feet 7 1/2 inches (3.54 m) depending on load. She had a displacement of 1,188 long tons (1,207 t) standard and up to 1,473 long tons (1,497 t) under full load.

The ship's machinery was based on that of the R-class destroyers which she was designed to lead. Three oil-fed Yarrow boilers raising steam at 250 pounds per square inch (1,700 kPa) fed Brown-Curtis geared steam turbines which developed 27,000 shaft horsepower (20,000 kW), driving two screws for a maximum designed speed of 34 knots (63 km/h; 39 mph). Valkyrie reached 34.79 knots (64.43 km/h; 40.04 mph) during sea trials, with her engines generating 29,563 shaft horsepower (22,045 kW). The ship carried 367 long tons (373 t) of oil giving a range of 3,500 nautical miles (6,500 km; 4,000 mi) at 15 knots (28 km/h; 17 mph).

She shipped four Mk V QF (quick fire) 4-inch L/45 guns in four single center-line mounts. These were disposed as two forward and two aft in super imposed firing positions. She also carried one QF 3-inch 20 cwt anti-aircraft gun aft of the second funnel. Aft of the 3-inch gun, she carried four 21-inch Torpedo tubes mounted in pairs on the center-line.

== History ==
HMS Valkyrie was completed on 16 June 1917 with the pennant number F.83, the first of the V-class leaders to complete. After commissioning Valkyrie joined the 10th Destroyer Flotilla as leader, forming part of the Harwich Force, and carrying out offensive sweeps and convoy escort operations. On 22 December 1917, Valkyrie was part of the escort for a convoy to the Netherlands when she struck a mine. Twelve men were killed, with seven more men dying of wounds in the next few days. Three more destroyers of the 10th Flotilla, Torrent, Surprise and Tornado, were sunk by mines on the next day. Valkyrie was under repair at Chatham Dockyard until July 1918.

After repair, Valkyrie joined the 13th Destroyer Flotilla based at Rosyth Dockyard led by the light cruiser Champion. In November 1918, following the Armistice that ended fighting with Germany, and the surrender of the German High Seas Fleet, the 13th Destroyer Flotilla, including Valkyrie, was sent to the Baltic Sea as part of the British intervention. The 13th Flotilla was relieved in January 1919. In 1919 she was reassigned to the 3rd Destroyer Flotilla.

In 1921, the destroyer force was again reorganised around smaller flotillas comprising eight destroyers and a leader. Valkyrie was assigned to the 9th Destroyer Flotilla which were laid up at Rosyth Dockyard with skeleton crews. After a refit at Chatham, Valkyrie returned to service in August 1923, operating in British waters with the 9th Flotilla until November 1925, when she, along with the rest of the Flotilla, was transferred to the 7th Destroyer Flotilla and laid up at Port Edgar. She returned to more active duty in June 1926 as the emergency destroyer at Rosyth, before being relieved by Verdun and returning to reserve in November that year.

In June 1927, Valkyrie joined the 2nd Destroyer Flotilla of the Mediterranean Fleet as a temporary replacement for Valentine while Valentine was having her boiler tubes replaced. Valkyrie then went back to reserve at Sheerness, where she remained until February 1927, when she was transferred to Rosyth, remaining in reserve.

== Disposition ==
In 1936 she was stricken and sold to the shipbreaking yard Thos. W. Ward's for scrap as part of a deal in which several laid up warships were traded for the old ocean liner RMS Majestic, which the Admiralty wanted to convert into a training ship.

== Pennant numbers ==
Pennant number	From	To
F83	June 1917	January 1918
F86	January 1918	June 1918
F05	June 1918	October 1919
F58	November 1919	January 1921
D61	January 1921	1936
