= Robert Bestwick =

English cricketer (1899–1980)

Robert Saxton Bestwick (29 September 1899 – 3 July 1980) was an English first-class cricketer who played for Derbyshire between 1920 and 1922.

Bestwick was born at Heanor, Derbyshire, the son of Billy Bestwick. His father was a miner who was also a leading bowler for Derbyshire in spite of his reputation as a bad boy of cricket. Bestwick junior made his debut for Derbyshire in May 1920 against Warwickshire when he made 2 and 6 at the tail end, but failed to take a wicket. He played one more game that season and was absent from the game in 1921. He reappeared again in 1922, sharing the bowling with his father in two matches. In the first of these, against Warwickshire, there was a unique father and son occurrence when for six overs Bestwick and his father bowled together against Willie Quaife and his son Bernard Quaife. After taking the wicket of the elder Quaife and another player, Bestwick junior did not strike in either subsequent match and was out with low scores, His father survived him in the game until 1925.

Bestwick was a right-hand batsman and played nine innings in five first-class matches with an average of 3.62 and a top score of 10. He was a right-arm fast-medium bowler and took 2 first-class wickets at an average of 75.50 and a best performance of 2 for 47.

Bestwick died at Saint Ouen, Jersey, at the age of 80.
