= Louis Flint =

English cricketer

Louis Edward Flint MC (10 January 1895 – 3 April 1958) was an English cricketer who played for Derbyshire in 1919 and 1920.

Flint was born in Ripley, Derbyshire. During World War I he served in the Sherwood Foresters. and was awarded an MC in the 1917 New Year Honours.

Flint made his debut for Derbyshire against Lancashire immediately following the re-institution of the County Championship after the First World War in 1919. He played 5 more matches in 1919 and one match in 1920, in seasons when Derbyshire scored poorly in the County Championship. Flint was a right-arm medium-fast bowler who took 8 wickets in total at an average of 36.37 and a best performance of 3-30. He was a left-handed batsman and played 11 innings in 7 matches with a top score of 35 and an average of 9.09.

Flint died in Sutton-in-Ashfield at the age of 63.
