= Walter Quaife =

English cricketer

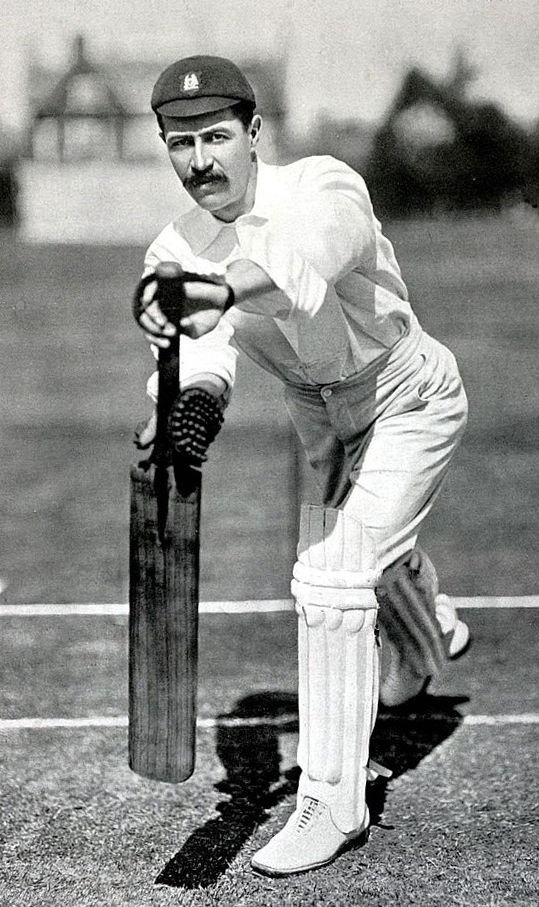

Personal information
- Full name: Walter Quaife
- Born: 1 April 1864; Newhaven, Sussex, England
- Died: 18 January 1943 (aged 78); Norwood, Surrey, England
- Batting: Right-handed
- Bowling: Right-arm medium
- Role: Batsman

Career statistics
Competition	First-class
Matches	224
Runs scored	8,536
Batting average	22.88
100s/50s	10/80
Top score	156*
Balls bowled	1,061
Wickets	15
Bowling average	30.86
5 wickets in innings	0
10 wickets in match	0
Best bowling	4/35
Catches/stumpings	80/–
- Source: CricInfo, 30 January 2010

Walter Quaife (1 April 1864 – 18 January 1943) was an English cricketer who made 224 appearances for Sussex and Warwickshire between 1884 and 1901. He scored 8,536 runs at 22.88, including ten centuries. His younger brother Willie Quaife was also a cricketer.
