= HMS Sylph (1916) =

British R-Class destroyer, WW1

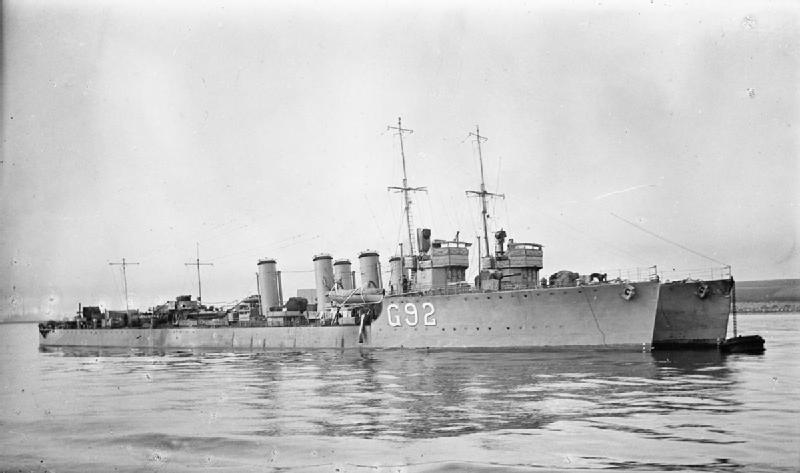
- Two R-class destroyers, sister ship HMS Rob Roy nearest

History

United Kingdom
- Name: HMS Sylph
- Namesake: Sylph
- Ordered: July 1915
- Builder: Harland & Wolff, Govan
- Laid down: 30 August 1916
- Launched: 15 November 1916
- Completed: 10 February 1917
- Out of service: 16 December 1926
- Home port: `
- Fate: Broken up

General characteristics
- Class & type: R-class destroyer
- Displacement: 975 long tons (991 t) (normal); 1,065 long tons (1,082 t) (deep load)
- Length: 265 ft (80.8 m) (p.p.)
- Beam: 26 ft 9 in (8.15 m)
- Draught: 8 ft 5 in (2.57 m)
- Installed power: 3 Yarrow boilers; 27,000 shp (20,000 kW)
- Propulsion: 2 geared Brown-Curtis steam turbines
- Speed: 36 knots (66.7 km/h; 41.4 mph)
- Range: 3,450 nmi (6,390 km; 3,970 mi) at 15 knots (28 km/h; 17 mph)
- Complement: 82
- Armament: 3 × QF 4 in (102 mm) Mark IV guns; 1 × 2-pdr (40 mm) "pom-pom" Mk. II anti-aircraft gun; 4 × 21 in (533 mm) torpedo tubes (2×2)

HMS Sylph was an R-class destroyer that served in the Royal Navy during the First World War. The R class were an improvement on the previous M class with geared steam turbines to improve efficiency. Launched by Harland & Wolff at Govan on 10 February 1917, Sylph joined the Harwich Force and escorted merchant ships and convoys in the North Sea. The ship encountered both German submarines and torpedo boats but did not record any hits on the enemy. However, during one action in foggy weather, the destroyer struck and sank sister ship Setter. After the Armistice that ended the war, the destroyer was initially placed in the reserve before being transferred to the Torpedo School in 1919. On 16 December 1926, Sylph was sold to be broken up.

== Design and development ==
Sylph was one of 17 R-class destroyer ordered by the British Admiralty as part of the Sixth War Programme in July 1915. The design was generally similar to the preceding M class, but differed in having geared steam turbines, the aft gun mounted on a raised platform and minor changes to improve seakeeping.

The destroyer had a length between perpendiculars of 265 feet (80.77 m), with a beam of 26 feet 9 inches (8.15 m) and a draught of 8 feet 6 inches (2.59 m). Displacement was 975 long tons (991 t) normal and 1,065 long tons (1,082 t) deep load. Power was provided by three Yarrow boilers feeding two Brown-Curtis geared turbines rated at 27,000 shaft horsepower (20,000 kW) and driving two shafts, to give a design speed of 36 knots (67 km/h; 41 mph). Three funnels were fitted. A total of 296 long tons (301 t) of fuel oil was carried, giving a design range of 3,450 nautical miles (6,390 km; 3,970 mi) at 15 knots (28 km/h; 17 mph).

Armament consisted of three QF 4in Mk IV guns on the ship's centreline, with one on the forecastle, one aft on a raised platform and one between the second and third funnels. A single 2-pounder (40 mm) pom-pom anti-aircraft gun was carried, while torpedo armament consisted of two twin mounts for 21 in (533 mm) torpedoes.The ship had a complement of 82 officers and ratings.

== Construction and career ==
Laid down by Harland & Wolff at their shipyard in Govan on 30 August 1916, Sylph was launched on 15 November 1916 and completed on 10 February 1917. The destroyer was the seventh to be named after sylph, an elemental spirit of the air in Rosicrucianism. Sylph was deployed as part of the Harwich Force, joining the Tenth Destroyer Flotilla.

Sylph was deployed as an escort for convoys which crossed the North Sea. On 5 March, along with the M-class destroyer Minos, Sylph was escorting the fast steamer SS Copenhagen when a torpedo was spotted, which struck the passenger ship on the port side. Sylph drew alongside and rescued 47 survivors before the ship sank. On 17 May, Sylph and sister ship Stork left Harwich at the head of two divisions of destroyers escorting a convoy of more than a dozen merchant ships in foggy weather. Sylph saw faint lights to the north and, assessing them as enemy vessels, steamed towards them. A confused fight ensued and Sylph narrowly missed the German ships, but hit the starboard quarter of the destroyer Setter. Despite attempts to save the ship, Setter was lost. The crew boarded Sylph and, one hour and twenty minutes after being rammed, the ship sank. One merchant ship from the convoy, SS Cito, was sunk by the German warships. The attack was possibly launched from the V25-class torpedo boats V71 and G81, although in the confusion of battle it is unclear which members of either the German 3rd Torpedo-Boat Flotilla or the Zeebrugge Half Flotilla were involved as both were deployed against the traffic on the route that night. On 15 July, the ship captured the German merchant ship SS Heinz Blumberg off the coast of Texel.

After the Armistice of 11 November 1918 that ended the war, the navy needed to move to a peacetime level of mobilisation. Both the number of ships and the amount of staff were reduced to save money. Sylph was transferred to join sixty-three other destroyers in reserve at Nore. The destroyer was recommissioned on 1 October 1919 and joined the Torpedo School. In 1923, the Navy decided to scrap many of the older destroyers in preparation for the introduction of newer and larger vessels. It was then decided that Sylph would be one of these to be retired. The destroyer was sold to Cashmore of Newport, Wales, on 16 December 1926. Stranded on 28 January the following year, the ship was broken up instead at Aberavon.

== Pennant numbers ==
Pennant number	Date
F54	September 1917
F68	January 1918
D93	September 1918
G69	January 1919
H0A	January 1922
