= HMS Petard (1916) =

Admiralty M-class destroyer

History

United Kingdom
- Name: HMS Petard
- Builder: William Denny and Brothers
- Laid down: 5 July 1915
- Launched: 24 March 1916
- Fate: Sold for scrap on 9 May 1921

General characteristics
- Class & type: Admiralty M-class destroyer
- Displacement: 994 long tons (1,010 t) standard; 1,042 long tons (1,059 t) full load
- Length: 269 ft (82 m)
- Beam: 27 ft 6 in (8.38 m)
- Draught: 8 ft 8 in (2.64 m) mean; 10 ft 6 in (3.20 m) maximum
- Propulsion: 3 shafts, steam turbines, 25,000 shp (18,642 kW)
- Speed: 34 knots (39 mph; 63 km/h)
- Range: 237–298 tons fuel oil
- Complement: 80
- Armament: 3 × QF 4 in (100 mm) Mark IV guns, mounting P Mk. IX; 3 × single QF 2 pdr "pom-pom" Mk. II; 2 × twin 21 inch (533 mm) torpedo tubes

HMS Petard was an Admiralty M-class destroyer built by Denny for the Royal Navy, commenced 5 July 1915 and launched on 24 March 1916. She saw service during the First World War. Postwar, she was sold for breaking up on 9 May 1921.

== Jutland ==
During the Battle of Jutland, Petard was one of ten destroyers of the 13th Destroyer Flotilla assigned to screen the 1st Battle Cruiser Squadron, following the lead of light cruiser HMS Champion. The first engagement of the battle was between a British force of six battlecruisers and four battleships and lighter vessels commanded by Admiral Beatty and a German squadron of five battlecruisers plus accompanying vessels commanded by Admiral Hipper.

At 4.15pm on 31 May 1916, the opposing fleets sent their destroyers in to deliver a torpedo attack on the opposing line. Petard was one of eight destroyers of the 13th flotilla to respond, along with three destroyers of other formations. The opposing destroyers fought a gun battle in hopes of blunting the enemy's torpedo attack while striving to deliver their own. Petard fired a torpedo on a high speed setting at a group of four German destroyers, possibly achieving a hit from about 3,000 yards range, and a second at a slower speed against the German battlecruisers from a range of about 9,000 yards. Petard then turned roughly parallel to the German battlecruisers but slightly converging, so as to get ahead of the column before once more turning towards the enemy to fire the remaining two torpedoes. Petard reported that her torpedoes must have crossed the enemy line, but did not claim a hit.

Turning back towards the British ships, Petard passed HMS Nestor, which was also returning but at reduced speed because of damage. It now became apparent that further German ships were approaching, which proved to be the main German High Seas Fleet. Proceeding, Petard approached an oil slick where HMS Laurel was picking up survivors from the battlecruiser HMS Queen Mary, sunk by German gunfire, and picked up one man. Approximately 20 survivors in total were rescued from the 1200 man crew. Petard then returned to her station at the head of the battlecruiser line.

N.B.: HMS Petard is erroneously identified in some references as the ship which rammed and sank HMS G9 on the night of 16 September 1917; the ship in question was the destroyer HMS Pasley.

== Bibliography ==
- Colledge, J. J.; Warlow, Ben (2006) [1969]. Ships of the Royal Navy: The Complete Record of All Fighting Ships of the Royal Navy from the 15th Century to the Present (3rd Rev ed.). London: Chatham Publishing. ISBN 978-1-86176-281-8. OCLC 67375475.
- Friedman, Norman (2009). British Destroyers: From Earliest Days to the Second World War. Barnsley, UK: Seaforth Publishing. ISBN 978-1-84832-049-9.
- Gardiner, Robert & Gray, Randal, eds. (1985). Conway's All The World's Fighting Ships 1906–1921. London: Conway Maritime Press. ISBN 0-85177-245-5.
- March, Edgar J. (1966). British Destroyers: A History of Development, 1892–1953; Drawn by Admiralty Permission From Official Records & Returns, Ships' Covers & Building Plans. London: Seeley Service. OCLC 164893555.
