= List of Italy-flagged cargo ships =

This list consists of cargo ships which are registered in Italy and are subject to the laws of that country. Any ship which flew the flag at any point in its career, and is present in the encyclopedia, is listed here.

Name	Owner	Year built	Years under flag	Type	Notes
Ata		1917	1948–1953		
Edera	Achille Lauro	1912	1931–1956	General	Scrapped in Italy in 1957.
Grande America	Grimaldi Group	1997	1999–2019	Roll-on/roll-off	Sank in Bay of Biscay in 2019.
Pietro Campanella					
Rastrello	Soc Ricuperi Marittima	1904	1937–1940	General	Sunk in British air raid in Naples.
Rosario					
