= British G-class submarine =

1915 class of British submarines

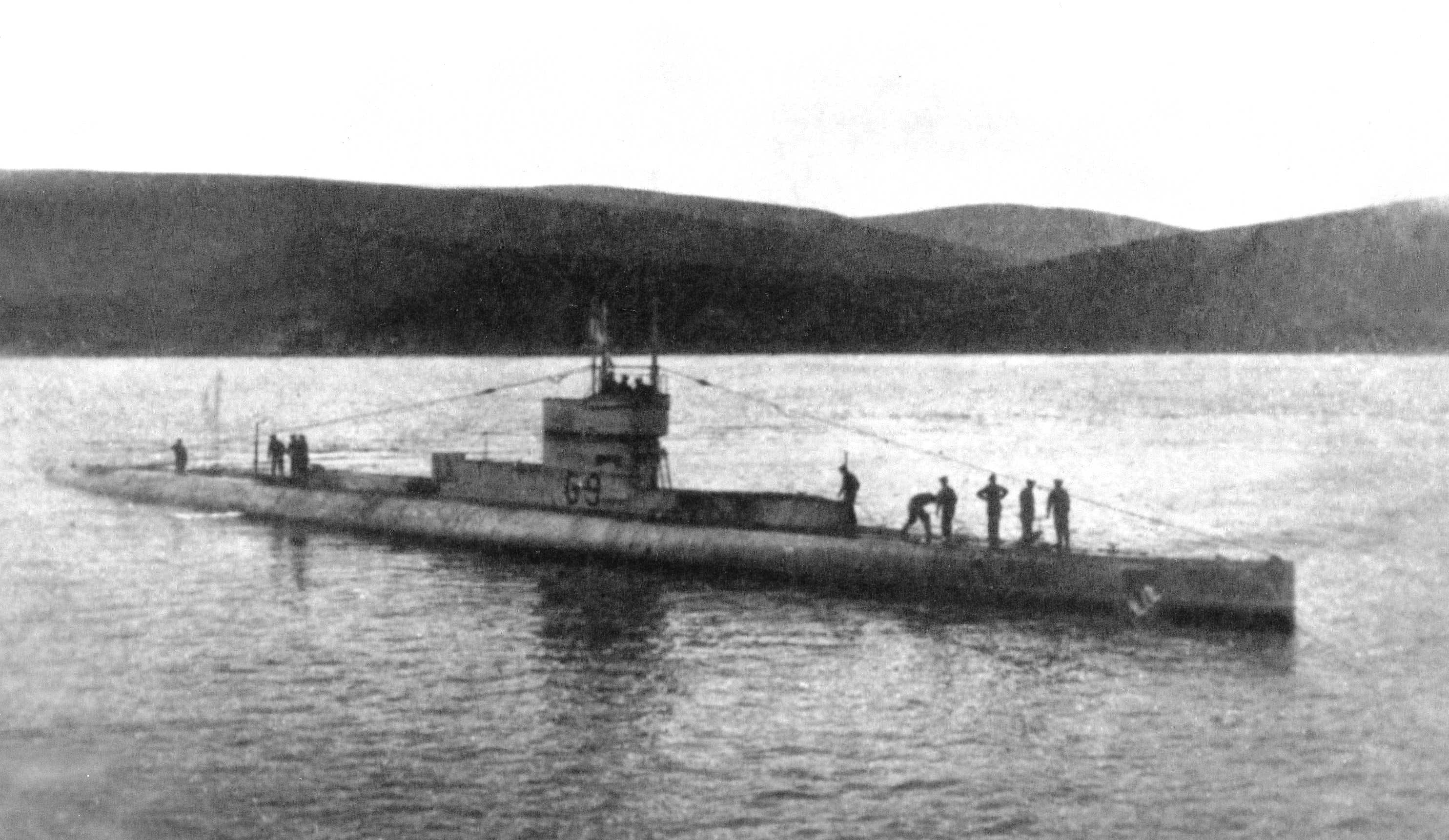
- G9

Class overview
- Name: G class
- Builders: HM Dockyard, Chatham; Armstrong Whitworth, Newcastle upon Tyne; Vickers, Barrow-in-Furness; Scott's, Greenock
- Operators: Royal Navy
- Built: 1914-1917
- In service: 1915-1921
- Completed: 14
- Canceled: 1
- Lost: 4
- Scrapped: 10

General characteristics
- Type: Submarine
- Displacement: 703 long tons (714 t) surfaced; 837 long tons (850 t) submerged
- Length: 187 ft 1 in (57.0 m)
- Beam: 22 ft 8 in (6.9 m)
- Draught: 13 ft 4 in (4.1 m)
- Installed power: 1,600 bhp (1,200 kW) (diesel); 840 hp (630 kW) (electric motor)
- Propulsion: 2 × Vickers diesel engines; 2 × electric motors
- Speed: 14.25 knots (26.39 km/h; 16.40 mph) surfaced; 9 knots (17 km/h; 10 mph) submerged
- Range: 2,400 nmi (4,400 km; 2,800 mi) at 12.5 kn (23.2 km/h; 14.4 mph) surfaced
- Complement: 30
- Armament: 4 × 18-inch (45 cm) torpedo tubes; 1 × 21-inch (53.3 cm) torpedo tube; 1 × 3-inch (7.6 cm) deck gun

The G-class were a series of diesel-electric submarines of the Royal Navy in World War I

They were launched between 1914 and 1917, and intended for operations in the North Sea and German Bight against German U-boats.

== Description ==
The G-class submarines were designed by the Admiralty in response to a rumour that the Germans were building double-hulled submarines for overseas duties. The submarines had a partial double hull, a length of 187 feet 1 inch (57.0 m) overall, a beam of 22 feet 8 inches (6.9 m) and a mean draught of 13 feet 4 inches (4.1 m). They displaced 703 long tons (714 t) on the surface and 837 long tons (850 t) submerged. However, the design offered little improvement in practice, the ships being notoriously slow to dive.

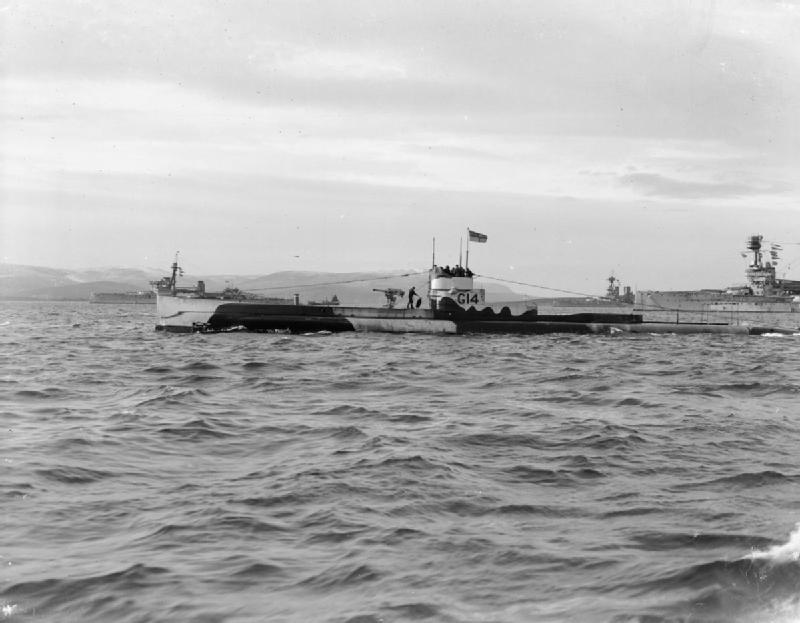
G 14, displaying raised bow

Most of the class had their bows raised during the war to increase buoyancy and improve seakeeping.

For surface running, the boats were nearly all powered by two 800-brake-horsepower (597 kW) Vickers two-stroke eight-cylinder diesel engines, each driving one propeller shaft. These engines were the first in the world to use Common Rail injection, using four plunger pumps to deliver a pressure up to 3,000 pounds per square inch (210 bar; 21 MPa) every 90° of rotation to keep the fuel pressure adequately constant in the 'rail' (pipe) serving all eight cylinders. G14 was initially powered by FIAT diesels, but these proved unsuccessful, and were replaced by the standard Vickers engines. It was originally intended to fit more efficient four-stroke MAN and Sulzer diesels to some of the class, but the outbreak of hostilities rendered such plans impossible. When submerged each propeller was driven by a 420-horsepower (313 kW) electric motor. They could reach 14.25 knots (26.39 km/h; 16.40 mph) on the surface and 9 knots (17 km/h; 10 mph) underwater. On the surface, the G class had a range of 2,400 nautical miles (4,400 km; 2,800 mi) at full speed.

The boats were originally intended to be armed with one 21-inch (53.3 cm) torpedo tube in the bow and two 18-inch (45 cm) torpedo tubes on the beam. This specification was revised while they were under construction, the 21-inch tube moved to the stern and two additional 18-inch tubes added in the bow; they carried two 21-inch and eight 18-inch torpedoes. The G-class was also armed with a single 3-inch (7.6 cm) deck gun.

The G-class submarines had a crew of 30 officers and ratings.

== Boats ==
A total of 14 boats were built at four yards: G1 to G5 by Chatham Dockyard, G6 & G7 by Armstrong Whitworth, G8 to G13 by Vickers, and G14 by Scott's on the Clyde. G15 was ordered from Samuel White's yard at Cowes, Isle of Wight, but cancelled.

- G1 - Launched 14 August 1915. Sold for scrap 1920.
- G2 - Launched 23 December 1915. Sank U-78 in the Skagerrak, 28 October 1918. Sold for scrap 1920.
- G3 - Launched 22 January 1916. Sold for scrap 1920.
- G4 - Launched 23 October 1915. Sold 1928.
- G5 - Launched 23 November 1915. Sold 1922.
- G6 - Launched 7 December 1915. Sold 1921.
- G7 - Launched 14 March 1916. Last British submarine lost in World War I, on or about 23 October 1918, cause unknown.
- G8 - Launched 1 May 1916. Lost in the North Sea for reasons unknown on or about 14 January 1918.
- G9 - Launched 15 June 1916. Sunk in error by HMS Pasley on 16 September 1917. One survivor.
- G10 - Launched 11 January 1916. Sold 1923.
- G11 - Launched 22 February 1916. Wrecked on rocks off Howick, Northumberland, in thick fog, 22 November 1918. Two crew drowned while abandoning ship.
- G12 - Launched 24 March 1916. Sold 1920.
- G13 - Launched 18 July 1916. Sank UC-43 off Muckle Flugga, 10 March 1917. Sold 1923.
- G14 - Launched 17 May 1917. Sold 1923.
- G15 - Ordered 30 September 1914, cancelled 20 April 1915
