= HMS E30 =

Submarine of the Royal Navy

- HMS E30

History

United Kingdom
- Name: E30
- Builder: Armstrong Whitworth, Newcastle upon Tyne
- Laid down: 29 June 1914
- Launched: 29 June 1915
- Commissioned: November 1915
- Fate: Sunk by mine, 22 November 1916

General characteristics
- Class & type: E-class submarine
- Displacement: 662 long tons (673 t) surfaced; 807 long tons (820 t) submerged
- Length: 181 ft (55 m)
- Beam: 15 ft (4.6 m)
- Propulsion: 2 × 800 hp (597 kW) diesel; 2 × 420 hp (313 kW) electric; 2 screws
- Speed: 15 knots (28 km/h; 17 mph) surfaced; 10 knots (19 km/h; 12 mph) submerged
- Range: 3,000 nmi (5,600 km; 3,500 mi) at 10 kn (19 km/h; 12 mph) surfaced; 65 nmi (120 km; 75 mi) at 5 kn (9.3 km/h; 5.8 mph) surfaced
- Complement: 31
- Armament: 5 × 18 in (450 mm) torpedo tubes (2 bow, 2 beam, 1 stern); 1 × 12-pounder gun

HMS E30 was a British E-class submarine built by Armstrong Whitworth, Newcastle upon Tyne. She was laid down on 29 June 1914 and was commissioned in November 1915. HMS E30 was lost in the North Sea, thought to have been mined off Orfordness, Suffolk on 22 November 1916, the minefield was not discovered until 25 November. There were no survivors.

== Design ==
Like all post-E8 British E-class submarines, E30 had a displacement of 662 long tons (673 t) at the surface and 807 long tons (820 t) while submerged. She had a total length of 180 feet (55 m) and a beam of 22 feet 8.5 inches (6.922 m). She was powered by two 800-horsepower (600 kW) Vickers eight-cylinder two-stroke diesel engines and two 420-horsepower (310 kW) electric motors. The submarine had a maximum surface speed of 16 knots (30 km/h; 18 mph) and a submerged speed of 10 knots (19 km/h; 12 mph). British E-class submarines had fuel capacities of 50 long tons (51 t) of diesel and ranges of 3,255 miles (5,238 km; 2,829 nmi) when travelling at 10 knots (19 km/h; 12 mph). E30 was capable of operating submerged for five hours when travelling at 5 knots (9.3 km/h; 5.8 mph).

E30 was armed with a 12-pounder 76 mm (3 in) QF gun mounted forward of the conning tower. She had five 18-inch (450 mm) torpedo tubes, two in the bow, one either side amidships, and one in the stern; a total of 10 torpedoes were carried. E-class submarines had wireless systems with 1 kilowatt (1.3 hp) power ratings; in some submarines, these were later upgraded to 3 kilowatts (4.0 hp) systems by removing a midship torpedo tube. Their maximum design depth was 100 feet (30 m) although in service some reached depths of below 200 feet (61 m). Some submarines contained Fessenden oscillator systems. Her complement was three officers and 28 men.

== Service ==
E30 joined the 11th Submarine Flotilla, based at Blyth, Northumberland on commissioning. From 23 to 28 February 1916 E30 patrolled off Denmark and Norway with the intention of capturing ships carrying iron ore from Norway to Germany, and to attack any German submarines that were escorting the Iron ore ships. No ships at all were seen during the patrol. E30 patrolled in the Kattegat in March 1915, and was damaged by heavy seas on 16 March, while on 18 March she stopped the Norwegian steamer Kong Inge, carrying a mixed cargo to Germany, off Anholt. She put a prize crew aboard Kong Inge and ordered the merchant ship to Leith for examination. On 5 April E30, together with the newly commissioned submarines G4 and G5 set out from Blyth with orders to patrol between Denmark and Orkney in the hope of intercepted German submarines. E30's patrol was cut short when she suffered a battery explosion on the morning of 7 April, killing four men and forcing her return to base.

On 15 May 1916, E30 set out for a patrol in the Kattegat, and on 18 June she encountered the German steamer Trave, whose crew abandoned ship after E30 fired a warning shot. E30 fired two torpedoes, which missed, and then sank the steamer with gunfire. On 2 June E30 was returning from a patrol off the coast of Norway when she spotted two British cruisers returning from the Battle of Jutland, which she signalled, but one of them, Minotaur, opened fire on E30 in response. Minotaur claimed to have sunk a submarine, but E30 returned home safely. On 3 July she encountered the Norwegian steamer Prunelle off Lindesnes in southern Norway. E30 fired two warning shots, but was driven away by the Norwegian torpedo boat Kjell. Norway raised a protest about the attempt to stop Prunelle, claiming it took place in territorial waters.

== Bibliography ==
- Hutchinson, Robert (2001). Jane's Submarines: War Beneath the Waves from 1776 to the Present Day. London: HarperCollins. ISBN 978-0-00-710558-8. OCLC 53783010.
- Monograph No. 31: Home Waters—Part VI: From October 1915 to May 1916 (PDF). Naval Staff Monographs (Historical). Vol. XV. The Naval Staff, Training and Staff Duties Division. 1926.
- Monograph No. 33: Home Waters—Part VII: From June 1916 to November 1916 (PDF). Naval Staff Monographs (Historical). Vol. XVII. The Naval Staff, Training and Staff Duties Division. 1927.
