= HMS G8 =

Submarine

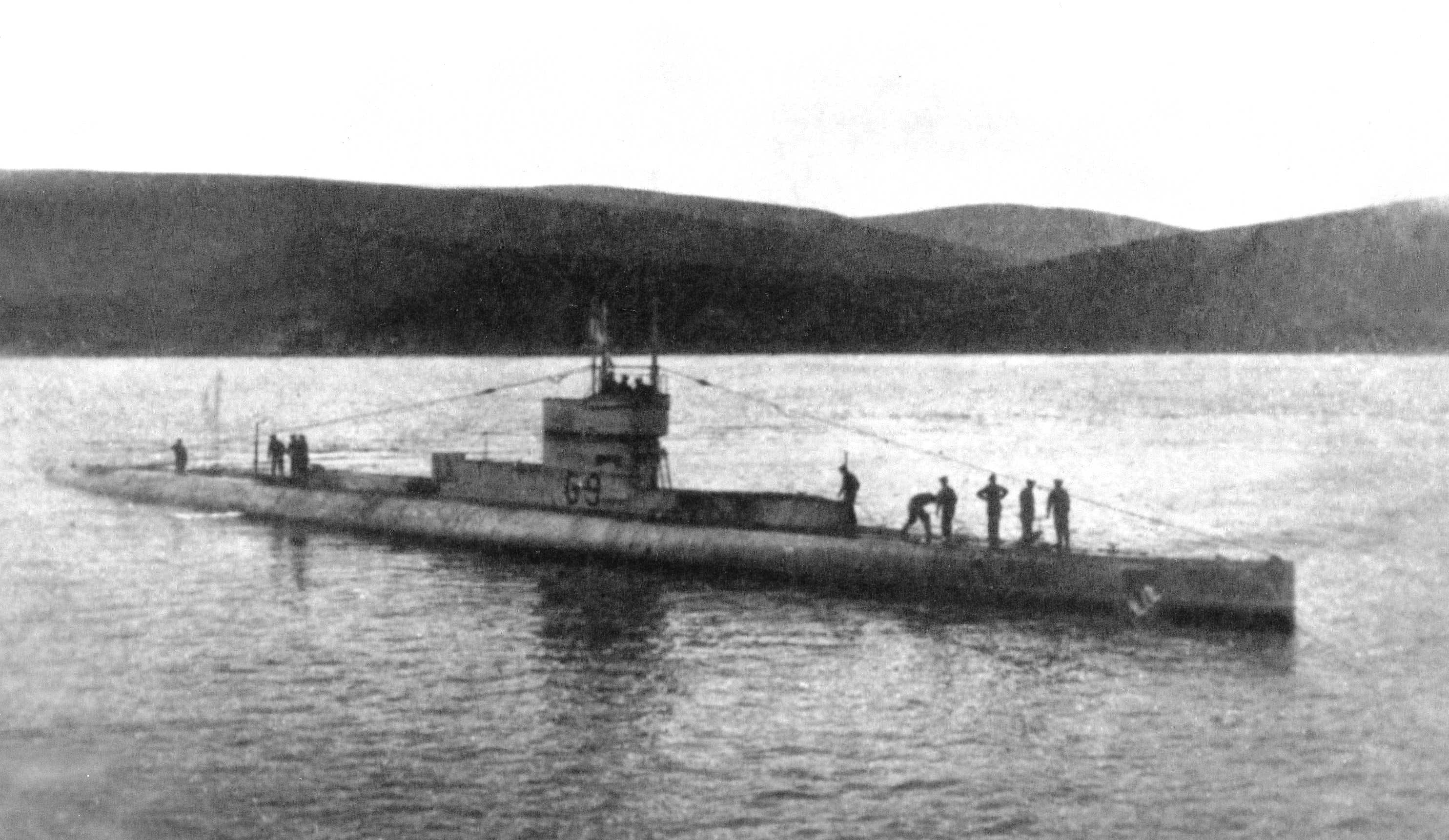
- HMS G9, a Royal Navy G-class submarine.

History

United Kingdom
- Name: G8
- Builder: Vickers
- Laid down: 18 December 1914
- Launched: 1 April 1916
- Commissioned: 30 June 1916
- Fate: Lost 14 January 1918

General characteristics
- Class & type: G-class submarine
- Displacement: Surfaced / Submerged: 703 tons / 837 tons
- Length: 57.5 m
- Beam: 6.92 m
- Draught: 4.15 m
- Installed power: 1,600 bhp (1,200 kW) (diesel); 840 hp (630 kW) (electric motor)
- Propulsion: 2 × diesel engines; 2 × electric motors
- Speed: Surfaced / Submerged: 14 knots (25.93 km/h)/ 9.0 knots (16.67 km/h)
- Range: 44.14 tons of fuel oil giving 3,160 nm surfaced at 10 knots (19 km/h). 95 nm submerged, at 3 knots (6 km/h).
- Complement: 30
- Armament: Torpedoes: 2 × 18 inch (450 mm) bow tubes, 2 × 18" beam tubes, 1 × 21 inch (533 mm) stern tube. 10 torpedoes in total. Guns: 1 × 3" 10 cwt. Mk.1 Elswick Quick Fire High Angle {QFHA}, forward. 1 × 12 pdr. 8 cwt. Mk. 1 gun HA mounting, aft.

HMS G8 was a G-class submarine of the Royal Navy that saw service during World War I, costing an estimated £125,000.

== Description ==
The G-class submarines were designed by the Admiralty in response to a rumour that the Germans were building double-hulled submarines for overseas duties. The submarines had a length of 187 feet 1 inch (57.0 m) overall, a beam of 22 feet 8 inches (6.9 m) and a mean draught of 13 feet 4 inches (4.1 m). They displaced 703 long tons (714 t) on the surface and 837 long tons (850 t) submerged. The G-class submarines had a crew of 30 officers and ratings. They had a partial double hull.

For surface running, the boats were powered by two 800-brake-horsepower (597 kW) Vickers two-stroke diesel engines, each driving one propeller shaft. When submerged each propeller was driven by a 420-horsepower (313 kW) electric motor. They could reach 14.25 knots (26.39 km/h; 16.40 mph) on the surface and 9 knots (17 km/h; 10 mph) underwater. On the surface, the G class had a range of 2,400 nautical miles (4,400 km; 2,800 mi) at 16 knots (30 km/h; 18 mph).

The boats were intended to be armed with one 21-inch (53.3 cm) torpedo tube in the bow and two 18-inch (45 cm) torpedo tubes on the beam. This was revised, however, while they were under construction, the 21-inch tube was moved to the stern and two additional 18-inch tubes were added in the bow. They carried two 21-inch and eight 18-inch torpedoes. The G-class submarines were also armed with a single 3-inch (7.6 cm) deck gun.

== War service ==
Submarine G8 (on right) moored alongside 10th Flotilla's depot ship HMS Lucia during World War I

Like the rest of her class, G8's role was to patrol the North Sea in search of German submarines.

G8 belonged to the 10th Flotilla during her war service, but also operated out of Scapa Flow during most of 1917. Her patrol areas were from north of Shetland to Norway, the Skagerrak, the Kattegat, and the Horns Reef. She also made one patrol out of Harwich for the 9th Flotilla in August 1916 before joining the Tees Flotilla.

Her last patrol began from Tees on 27 December 1917, leaving with the submarine HMS G12 and the destroyer HMS Medea for the Kattegat. She was ordered to start her voyage back on 3 January 1918 or possibly 48 hours later, returning to Tees on or around 6 January 1918. She did not return and was never heard from again. She was officially declared missing on 14 January 1918. The cause remains unknown, but she was found with depth rudders pointing towards the surface, which suggests that the men aboard were trying to get to the surface. Therefore, it is thought that a technical error led to the sinking. There is no evidence on the wreck of it being hit by torpedoes or mines.

== Discovery and salvage ==
The wreck was found in 2019 by the Danish "Sea War Museum Jutland" while they were in the process of registering all wrecks in Danish sea territories "Kattegat" and "Skagerak". It rests on approximately 100 m. of water. There are no plans of recovering the wreck.
