= HMS Medea =

Seven ships of the Royal Navy have borne the name HMS Medea, or HMS Medee, after the Medea of Greek mythology, whilst another was planned:

- HMS Medea (1744) was a 26-gun sixth rate, originally the French Medee. She was captured by HMS Dreadnought in 1744 and was sold in 1745. She subsequently operated as the privateer Boscawen.
- HMS Medea (1778) was a 28-gun sixth rate launched in 1778 and sold in 1795.
- HMS Medee was the 36-gun fifth rate Médée captured from the French in 1800. She was used as a prison ship from 1802 and was sold in 1805.
- HMS Medea was to have been a 32-gun fifth rate of 658 tons. She was ordered from Woolwich Dockyard in 1800 but was later cancelled.
- HMS Medea (1833) was a paddle sloop launched in 1833 and sold in 1867.
- HMS Medea (1888) was a Marathon-class second class cruiser launched in 1888 and sold in 1914.
- HMS Medea (1915) was a Medea-class destroyer, originally to be the Greek Kriti. She was purchased on the ways in 1914, launched in 1915, and sold for breaking up in 1921.
- HMS Medea was an M15-class monitor, launched in 1915 as HMS M22. She was renamed HMS Medea in 1925 and was sold in 1938, wrecked after parting tow to the breaker's yard 23 or 28, January 1939.

== See also ==
- HMS Meda
