= HMS G7 =

Submarine of the Royal Navy

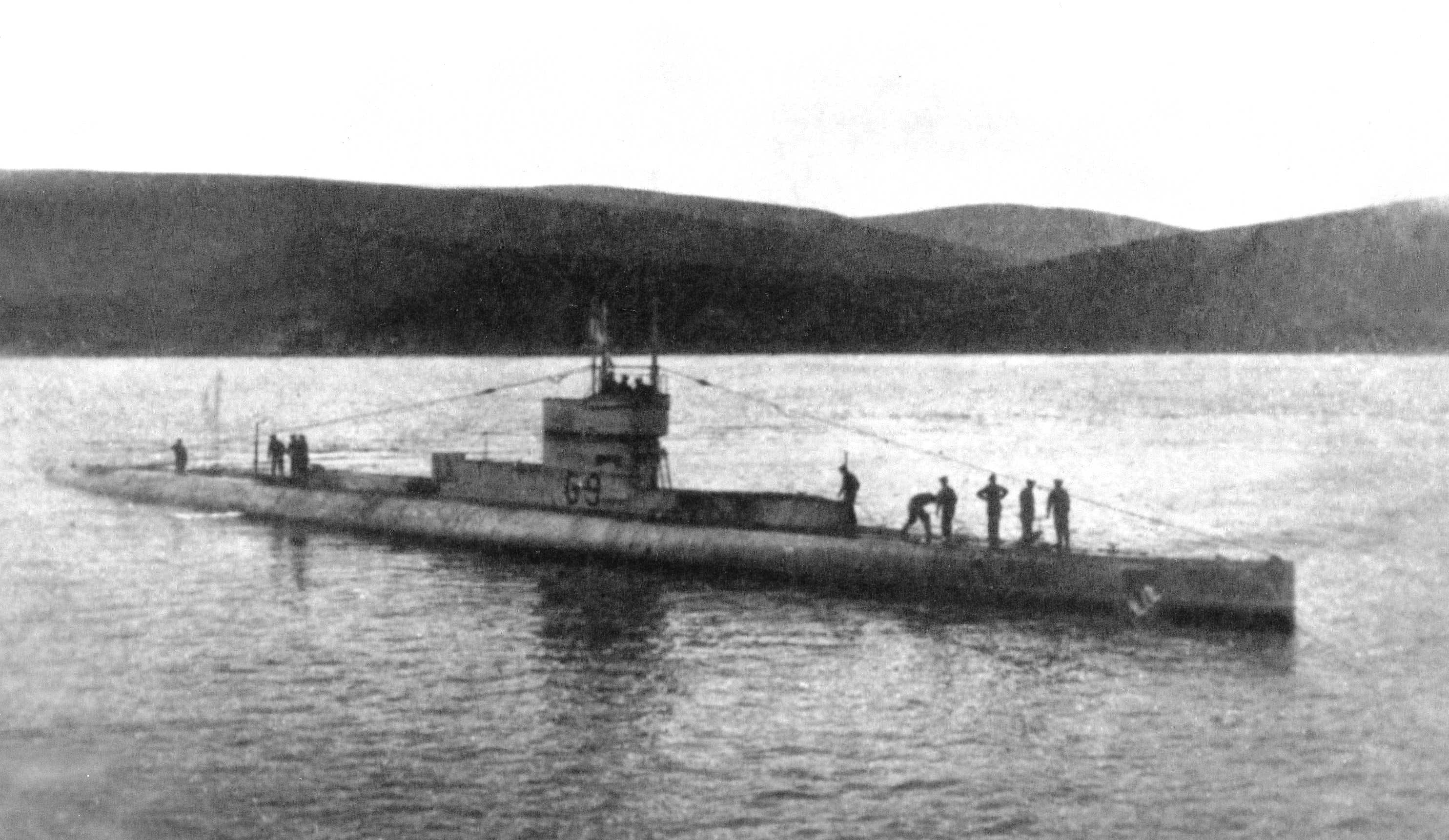
- A G-class submarine before bow modification

History

United Kingdom
- Name: G7
- Builder: Armstrong Whitworth
- Launched: 4 March 1916
- Commissioned: 21 August 1916
- Fate: Sunk October 1918 in the North Sea.

General characteristics
- Class & type: G-class submarine
- Displacement: 703 long tons (714 t) surfaced; 837 long tons (850 t) submerged
- Length: 187 ft 1 in (57.0 m)
- Beam: 22 ft 8 in (6.9 m)
- Draught: 13 ft 4 in (4.1 m)
- Installed power: 1,600 bhp (1,200 kW) (diesel); 840 hp (630 kW) (electric motor)
- Propulsion: 2 × diesel engines; 2 × electric motors
- Speed: 14.25 knots (26.39 km/h; 16.40 mph) surfaced; 9 knots (17 km/h; 10 mph) submerged
- Range: 2,400 nmi (4,400 km; 2,800 mi) at 12.5 kn (23.2 km/h; 14.4 mph) surfaced
- Complement: 30
- Armament: 4 × 18-inch (45 cm) torpedo tubes; 1 × 21-inch (53.3 cm) torpedo tube

HMS G7 was a British G-class submarine built for the Royal Navy during World War I.

== Description ==
The G-class submarines were designed by the Admiralty in response to a rumour that the Germans were building double-hulled submarines for overseas duties. The submarines had a length of 187 feet 1 inch (57.0 m) overall, a beam of 22 feet 8 inches (6.9 m) and a mean draught of 13 feet 4 inches (4.1 m). They displaced 703 long tons (714 t) on the surface and 837 long tons (850 t) submerged. The G-class submarines had a crew of 30 officers and ratings. They had a partial double hull.

For surface running, the boats were powered by two 800-brake-horsepower (597 kW) Vickers two-stroke diesel engines, each driving one propeller shaft. When submerged each propeller was driven by a 420-horsepower (313 kW) electric motor. They could reach 14.25 knots (26.39 km/h; 16.40 mph) on the surface and 9 knots (17 km/h; 10 mph) underwater. On the surface, the G class had a range of 2,400 nautical miles (4,400 km; 2,800 mi) at 16 knots (30 km/h; 18 mph).

The boats were intended to be armed with one 21-inch (53.3 cm) torpedo tube in the bow and two 18-inch (45 cm) torpedo tubes on the beam. This was revised, however, while they were under construction, the 21-inch tube was moved to the stern and two additional 18-inch tubes were added in the bow. They carried two 21-inch and eight 18-inch torpedoes. The G-class submarines were also armed with a single 3-inch (7.6 cm) deck gun.

== Career ==
Like the rest of her class, G7's role was to patrol an area of the North Sea in search of German U-boats. On 15 April 1917, G7 was patrolling between Lerwick and Bergen when she sighted the German submarine U-30. G7 fired a torpedo at U-30 and after an exchange of gunfire the German submarine dived away. Although U-30 escaped unscathed, G7 had interrupted U30's attempts to sink two Norwegian merchant ships. One, Svanfos, which still had a boarding party from U-30 aboard, returned to Bergen under her own steam, while the second, the Borgila, had been abandoned by her crew. G7 put a salvage party aboard Borgila until the Norwegian destroyer Draug arrived to take over.

In October 1918 G7 was on patrol in the North Sea. Communications were lost on 23 October and she was declared lost on 1 November.
