= HMS G1 =

Submarine of the Royal Navy

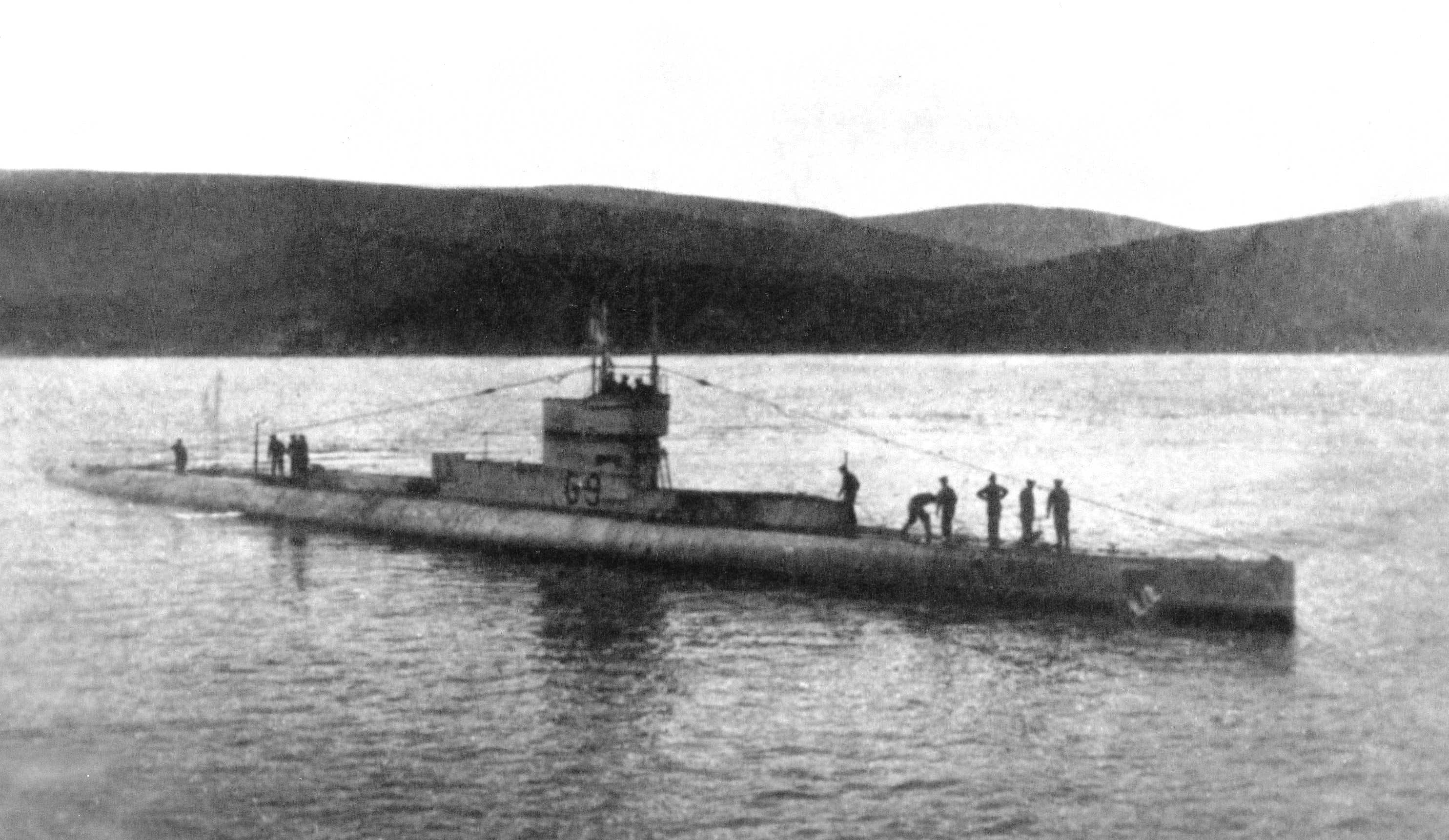
- G9 before bow modification

History

United Kingdom
- Name: G1
- Builder: Chatham Dockyard
- Laid down: 1 October 1914
- Launched: 14 August 1915
- Commissioned: November 1915
- Fate: Sold for scrap, 14 February 1920 to Fryer, Sunderland.

General characteristics
- Class & type: G-class submarine
- Displacement: 703 long tons (714 t) surfaced; 837 long tons (850 t) submerged
- Length: 187 ft 1 in (57.0 m)
- Beam: 22 ft 8 in (6.9 m)
- Draught: 13 ft 4 in (4.1 m)
- Installed power: 1,600 bhp (1,200 kW) (diesel); 840 hp (630 kW) (electric motor)
- Propulsion: 2 × diesel engines; 2 × electric motors
- Speed: 14.25 knots (26.39 km/h; 16.40 mph) surfaced; 9 knots (17 km/h; 10 mph) submerged
- Range: 2,400 nmi (4,400 km; 2,800 mi) at 12.5 kn (23.2 km/h; 14.4 mph) surfaced
- Complement: 30
- Armament: 4 × 18-inch (45 cm) torpedo tubes; 1 × 21-inch (53.3 cm) torpedo tube

HMS G1 was a British G-class submarine built for the Royal Navy during World War I.

== Description ==
The G-class submarines were designed by the Admiralty in response to a rumour that the Germans were building double-hulled submarines for overseas duties. The submarines had a length of 187 feet 1 inch (57.0 m) overall, a beam of 22 feet 8 inches (6.9 m) and a mean draught of 13 feet 4 inches (4.1 m). They displaced 703 long tons (714 t) on the surface and 837 long tons (850 t) submerged. The G-class submarines had a crew of 30 officers and ratings. They had a partial double hull.

For surface running, the boats were powered by two 800-brake-horsepower (597 kW) Vickers two-stroke eight cylinder diesel engines, each driving one propeller shaft. When submerged each propeller was driven by a 420-horsepower (313 kW) electric motor. They could reach 14.25 knots (26.39 km/h; 16.40 mph) on the surface and 9 knots (17 km/h; 10 mph) underwater. On the surface, the G class had a range of 2,400 nautical miles (4,400 km; 2,800 mi) at 16 knots (30 km/h; 18 mph).

The boats were intended to be armed with one 21-inch (53.3 cm) torpedo tube in the bow and two 18-inch (45 cm) torpedo tubes on the beam. This was revised, however, while they were under construction, the 21-inch tube was moved to the stern and two additional 18-inch tubes were added in the bow. They carried two 21-inch and eight 18-inch torpedoes. The G-class submarines were also armed with a single 3-inch (7.6 cm) deck gun.

== Career ==
Like the rest of her class, G1's role was to patrol an area of the North Sea in search of German U-boats. She survived the war and was sold for scrap in 1920.
