= HMS G9 =

Submarine of the Royal Navy

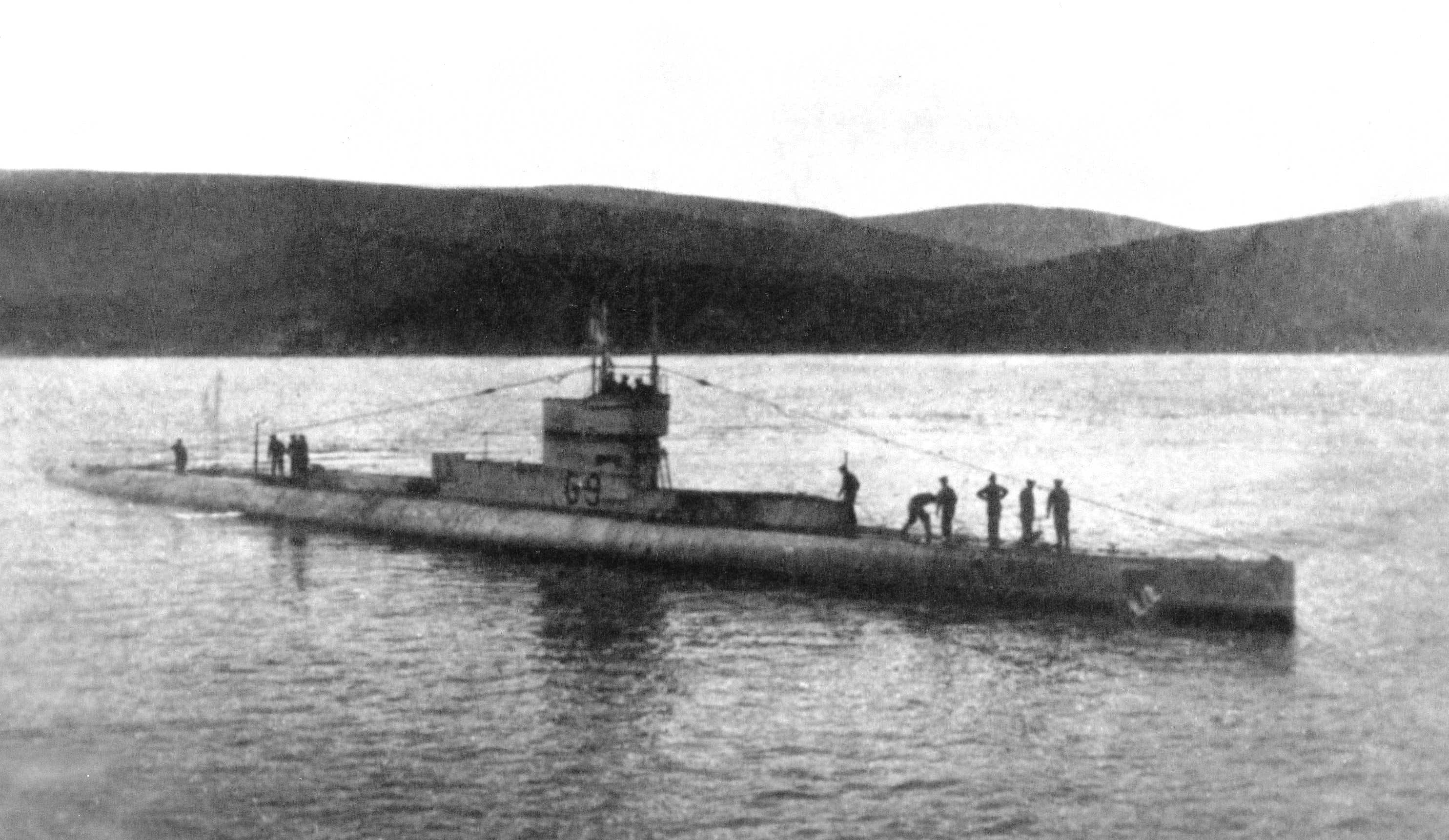
- G9 at Scapa Flow.

History

United Kingdom
- Name: G9
- Builder: Vickers, Barrow-in-Furness
- Laid down: 8 December 1914
- Launched: 15 June 1916
- Commissioned: 22 August 1916
- Fate: Sunk 16 September 1917

General characteristics
- Class & type: G-class submarine
- Displacement: Surfaced: 703 tons; Submerged: 837 tons
- Length: 57.5 m (188 ft 8 in)
- Beam: 6.92 m (22 ft 8 in)
- Draught: 4.15 m (13 ft 7 in)
- Installed power: 1,600 bhp (1,200 kW) (diesel); 840 hp (630 kW) (electric motor)
- Propulsion: 2 × Diesel engines; 2 × Electric motors
- Speed: Surfaced: 14.5 knots (27 km/h); Submerged: 10.0 knots (19 km/h)
- Range: 44.14 tons of fuel oil giving 3,160 nm surfaced at 10 knots (19 km/h). 95 nm submerged, at 3 knots (6 km/h).
- Complement: 31
- Armament: Torpedoes: 2 × 18 inch (450 mm) bow tubes, 2 × 18 inch (450 mm) beam tubes, 1 × 21 inch (533 mm) stern tube. 10 torpedoes in total.; Guns: 1 × 3" 10 cwt. Mk.1 Elswick Quick Fire High Angle (QFHA), forward. 1 × 12 pdr. 8 cwt. Mk. 1 gun HA mounting, aft.

HMS G9 was a G-class submarine, one of eight Royal Navy submarines known to have been lost to friendly fire in World War I.

== Construction ==
The second of her class built by Vickers at Barrow-in-Furness, G9 was laid down on 8 December 1914. She was launched on 15 June 1916, and commissioned on 22 August that year.

== Description ==
The G-class submarines were designed by the Admiralty in response to a rumour that the Germans were building double-hulled submarines for overseas duties. The submarines had a length of 187 feet 1 inch (57.0 m) overall, a beam of 22 feet 8 inches (6.9 m) and a mean draught of 13 feet 4 inches (4.1 m). They displaced 703 long tons (714 t) on the surface and 837 long tons (850 t) submerged. The G-class submarines had a crew of 30 officers and ratings. They had a partial double hull.

For surface running, the boats were powered by two 800-brake-horsepower (597 kW) Vickers two-stroke diesel engines, each driving one propeller shaft. When submerged each propeller was driven by a 420-horsepower (313 kW) electric motor. They could reach 14.25 knots (26.39 km/h; 16.40 mph) on the surface and 9 knots (17 km/h; 10 mph) underwater. On the surface, the G class had a range of 2,400 nautical miles (4,400 km; 2,800 mi) at 16 knots (30 km/h; 18 mph).

The boats were intended to be armed with one 21-inch (53.3 cm) torpedo tube in the bow and two 18-inch (45 cm) torpedo tubes on the beam. This was revised, however, while they were under construction, the 21-inch tube was moved to the stern and two additional 18-inch tubes were added in the bow. They carried two 21-inch and eight 18-inch torpedoes. The G-class submarines were also armed with a single 3-inch (7.6 cm) deck gun.

== War service ==
The role of the G class was to patrol the North Sea and German Bight in search of U-boats.

== Loss ==
G9 was sunk by the destroyer HMS Pasley in foul weather on the night of 16 September 1917. G9 had mistaken Pasley for a U-boat and fired two torpedoes at her. The first struck Pasley on her starboard quarter, but too acutely to detonate; the second passed astern. On seeing the submarine's wash, Pasley's officer of the watch, Midshipman Frank Wallis, RNR, turned the boat hard to starboard and rammed G9 just aft of amidships all but cutting her in two, and she sank less than one minute later with the loss of all but one of her crew, Stoker William Drake.

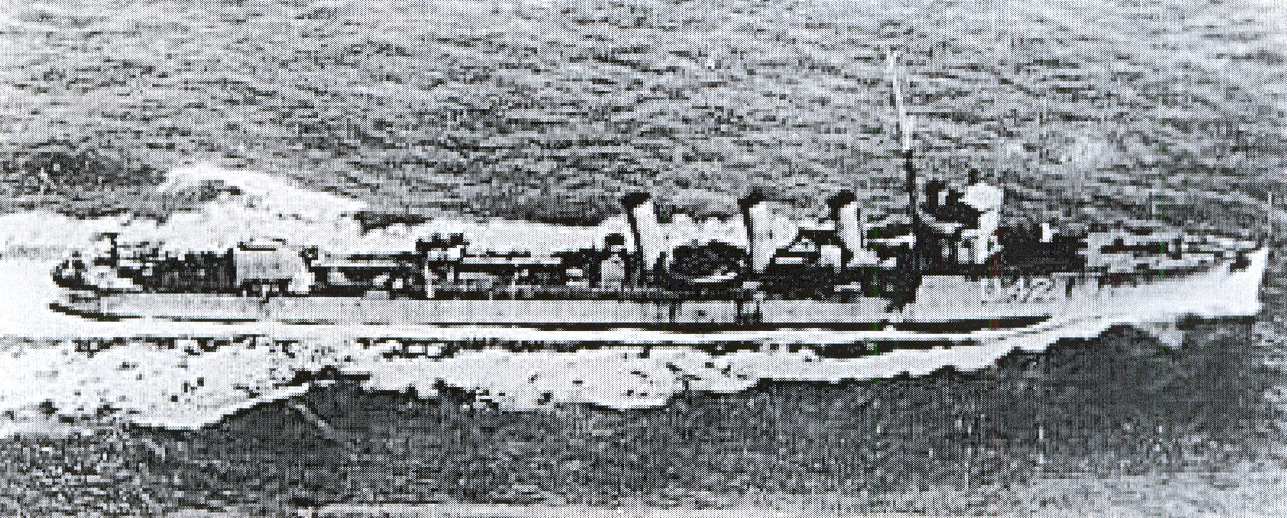
HMS Pasley

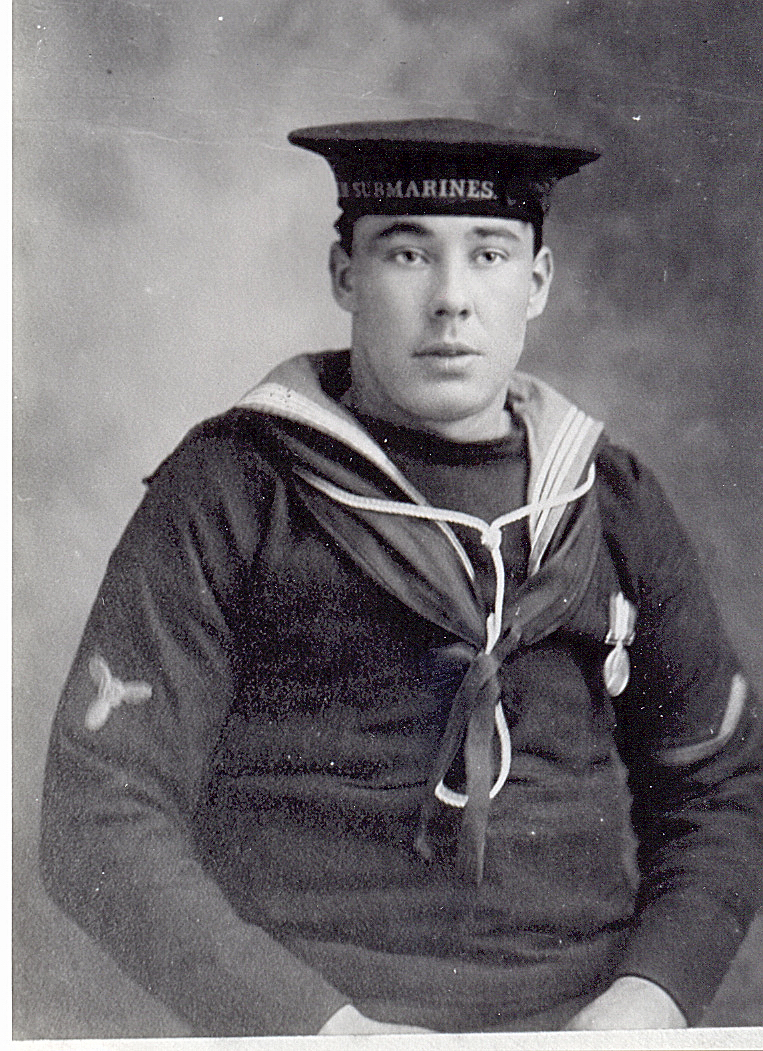
Stoker Drake

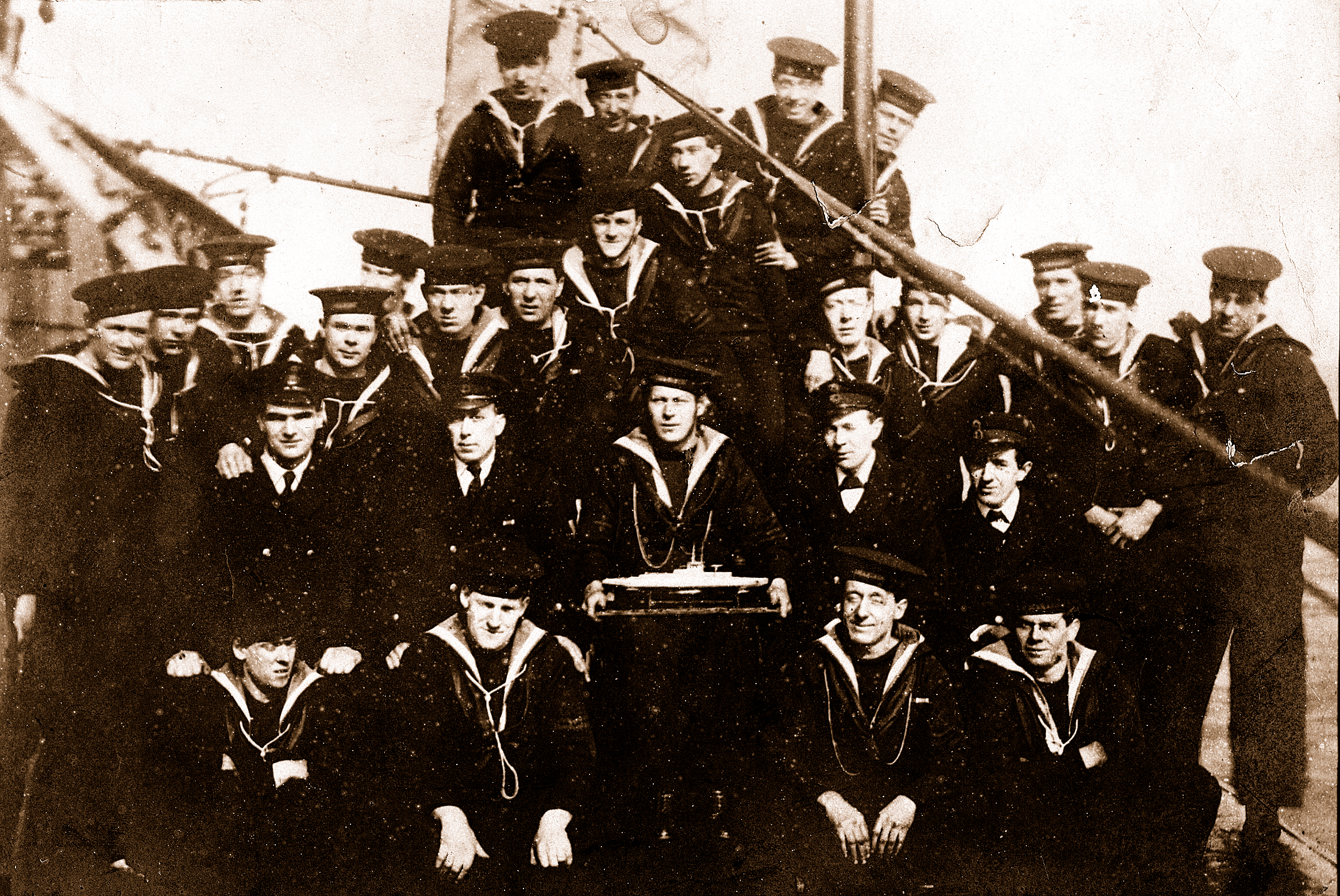
G9 crew: Stoker Drake at extreme right of picture standing-easy. A B Baby centre of back row of 5.

G9 had sailed Scapa Flow on 9 September 1917 to patrol an area between Shetland and Norway. On 15 September 1917, she was ordered north to between latitudes 60.30 N and 61.30 N to keep her clear of the fleet on exercises en route from Rosyth to Scapa. Meanwhile, Pasley was attempting to locate merchantmen detached from the convoy she was escorting in appalling weather from Russia via Aspö Fjord, 100 km north of Bergen, to Lerwick, and had resorted to displaying a white light halfway up the mast by night for guidance. Weathering the heavy seas and blinding rain squalls, Cary sighted Pasley's light; forewarned a U-boat was in the area, he gave the order to attack. Presumably realizing the error soon afterwards, Cary ordered the connection of the cruiser arc lamp to signal the destroyer. The signal was recognised aboard Pasley; her captain, Commander Charles Ramsey, ordered 'Full Astern', but it was too late to prevent his ship ramming the submarine.

After the collision, the crew on G9 were ordered to assemble beneath the conning tower. Stoker William Drake saw one man climb the ladder above him, and followed. Although caught in the stomach by the lower conning tower door, which had probably been ordered shut in the hope of keeping the boat buoyant, Drake managed to struggle free and reach the bridge, only to be swept off as the boat sank beneath him. Of the five men in the water, Drake was the only one to reach Pasley, which had stopped to rescue survivors. Weakened by the effort and numbed by the cold water, Drake was unable to pull himself up on the lifeline lowered, and was only rescued after Able Seaman Henry Old clambered over the side of the destroyer to secure a running bowline around him; he was then hauled aboard and taken below. Still unconvinced of his attacker's identity, Commander Ramsey went to question the survivor. Finding Drake laid on his stomach to help rid his lungs of seawater, Ramsey kicked the soles of his feet and demanded to know his nationality.

== Aftermath ==
A Court of Inquiry was held aboard HMS Indomitable at Scapa, four days after the sinking. The court decided no blame could be attached to Pasley, concluding "that the process of reasoning which led the captain of HM Submarine G9 to mistake HMS Pasley for a U-boat is, and must remain, unexplained".

The findings were forwarded to the Commander in Chief, Grand Fleet, Admiral David Beatty, who remarked that the incident was "...one of those that are inseparable from war", but deplored the delay in introducing improved signalling facilities on submarines, particularly the substitution of the slow, unreliable and cumbersome cruiser arc lamp with Aldis lamps.

Their Lords Commissioners of the Admiralty later directed Commander Ramsey to inform Midshipman Wallis that in the opinion of the Court of Inquiry the action taken by him "was the right action to take under the circumstances, and that its result, so deeply to be regretted, is evidence that it was taken with commendable promptness and precision....".

The captain of G9, Lt. Commander Cary, was posthumously awarded the DSO in recognition of his 'arduous service in submarines'.

== Wreck ==
The website 'Wrecksite' gives the final resting place of HMS G9 as approximately 70 miles north west of Bergen in position 61°00′N 3°20′E in 350 m of water. However, the wreck is not shown on the relevant UK hydrographic chart no. 299.

== Epilogue ==
William Drake remained in the submarine service until the 1930s, and served aboard the frigate HMS Swale as Stoker Petty Officer in World War II; he died in 1974 aged 80. Commander Charles Gordon Ramsey rose to the rank of Admiral. After retiring in 1942, he was knighted, and served as aide-de-camp to King George VI; he died in 1966 aged 84. Photographic portraits of Ramsey by Bassano are held by the National Portrait Gallery, London.

== See also ==
- List of submarines of the Royal Navy
- List of submarine classes of the Royal Navy
