= HMS G3 =

Submarine of the Royal Navy

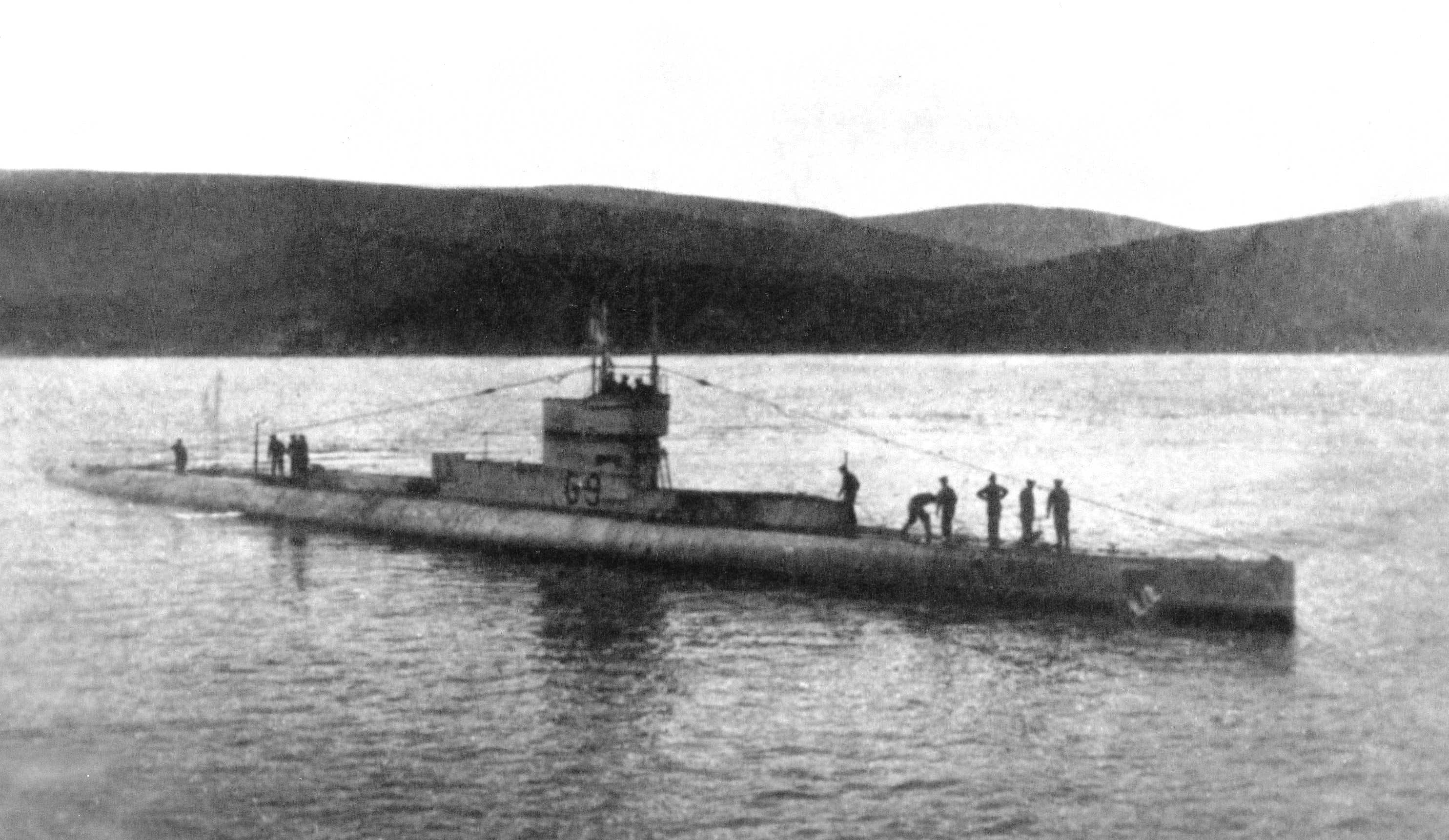
- A G-class submarine before bow modification.

History

United Kingdom
- Name: G3
- Builder: Chatham Dockyard
- Laid down: 1 October 1914
- Launched: 22 January 1916
- Commissioned: 13 April 1916
- Fate: Sold for scrap, 4 November 1921 to Young, Sunderland, she was wrecked in Filey Bay after breaking her tow the following month.

General characteristics
- Class & type: G-class submarine
- Displacement: 703 long tons (714 t) surfaced; 837 long tons (850 t) submerged
- Length: 187 ft 1 in (57.0 m)
- Beam: 22 ft 8 in (6.9 m)
- Draught: 13 ft 4 in (4.1 m)
- Installed power: 1,600 bhp (1,200 kW) (diesel); 840 hp (630 kW) (electric motor)
- Propulsion: 2 × diesel engines; 2 × electric motors
- Speed: 14.25 knots (26.39 km/h; 16.40 mph) surfaced; 9 knots (17 km/h; 10 mph) submerged
- Range: 2,400 nmi (4,400 km; 2,800 mi) at 12.5 kn (23.2 km/h; 14.4 mph) surfaced
- Complement: 30
- Armament: 4 × 18-inch (45 cm) torpedo tubes; 1 × 21-inch (53.3 cm) torpedo tube

HMS G3 was a British G-class submarine built for the Royal Navy during World War I.

== Description ==
The G-class submarines were designed by the Admiralty in response to a rumour that the Germans were building double-hulled submarines for overseas duties and were built with a partial double hull.. The submarines had a length of 187 feet 1 inch (57.0 m) overall, a beam of 22 feet 8 inches (6.9 m) and a mean draught of 13 feet 4 inches (4.1 m). They displaced 703 long tons (714 t) on the surface and 837 long tons (850 t) submerged. The G-class submarines had a crew of 30 officers and ratings.

For surface running, the boats were powered by two 800 bhp (597 kW) Vickers two-stroke diesel engines, each driving one propeller shaft. When submerged each propeller was driven by a 420 hp (313 kW) electric motor. They could reach 14.25 knots (30 km/h; 20 mph) on the surface and 9 knots (17 km/h; 10 mph) underwater. On the surface, the G class had a range of 2,400 nautical miles (4,400 km; 2,800 mi) at 16 knots (30 km/h; 18 mph).

It has a single 21-inch (53.3 cm) torpedo tube in the stern, two 18-inch (45 cm) torpedo tubes on the beam and two in the bow. They carried two 21-inch and eight 18-inch torpedoes. It has a single 3-inch (7.6 cm) deck gun.

== Career ==
Like the rest of her class, G3's role was to patrol an area of the North Sea in search of German U-boats.

In December 1921 G3, out of commission, was being towed north to be broken up for scrap when she broke her tether and came ashore at Scalby Mills, north of Scarborough. The submarine later broke free from the shore and drifted back out to sea. She then drifted south, finally running aground under Buckton cliffs in Filey Bay, bow first. A local man, John Webster bought the salvage rights to the vessel and the wreck was scrapped. Lumps of the hulk were lifted up the sheer cliffs using ropes and pulleys, the salvers using rope ladders for access. The remains of the wreck lie under the cliffs at Buckton including about 60 feet (18 m) of the base of the hull, two diesel engines and their drive gear.
