= HMS G10 =

Submarine of the Royal Navy

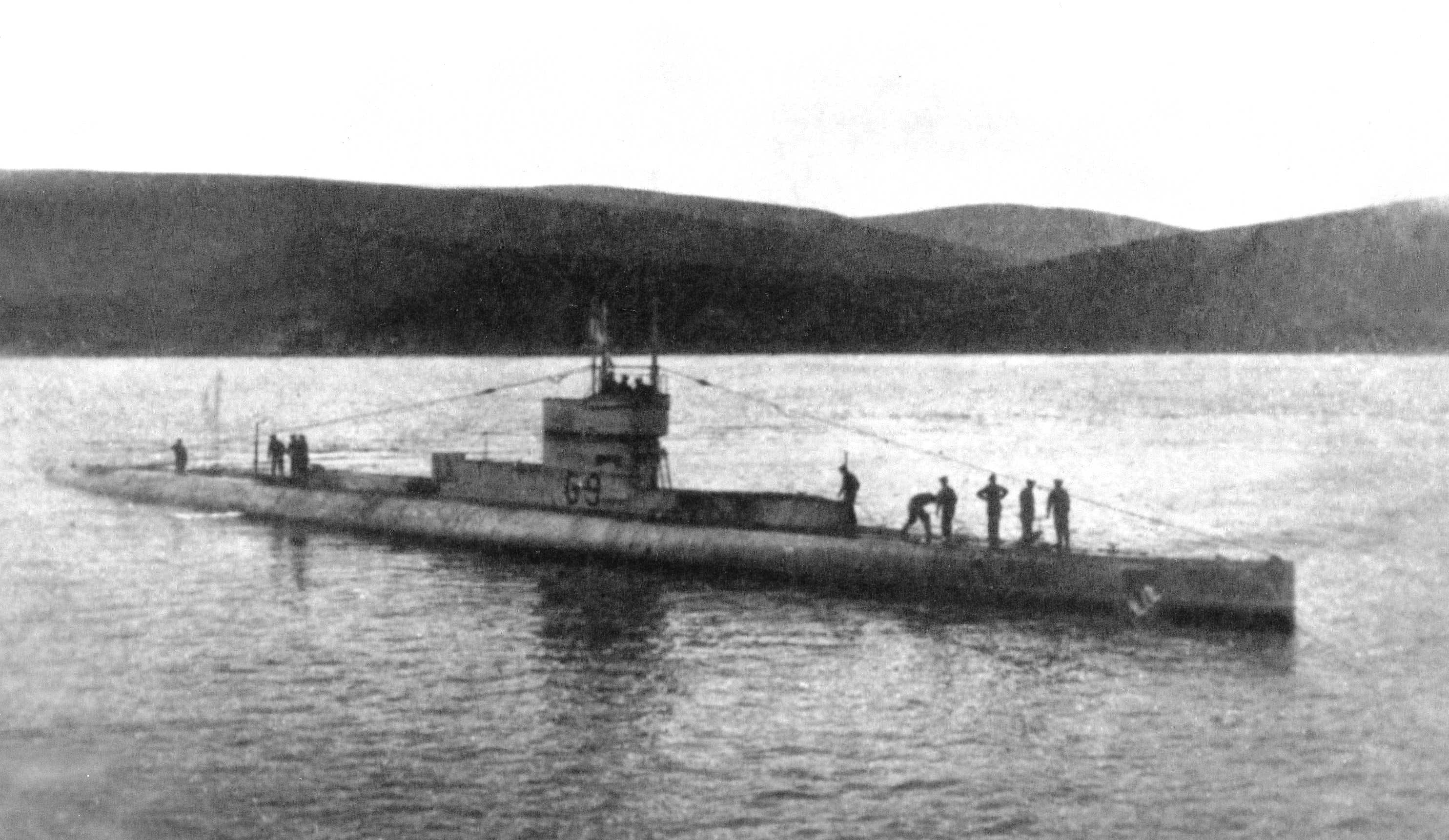
- A G-class submarine before bow modification.

History

United Kingdom
- Name: G10
- Builder: Vickers
- Laid down: 12 March 1915
- Launched: 11 January 1916
- Commissioned: 12 April 1916
- Fate: Sold, 20 January 1923 to J Smith

General characteristics
- Class & type: G-class submarine
- Displacement: 703 long tons (714 t) surfaced; 837 long tons (850 t) submerged
- Length: 187 ft 1 in (57.0 m)
- Beam: 22 ft 8 in (6.9 m)
- Draught: 13 ft 4 in (4.1 m)
- Installed power: 1,600 bhp (1,200 kW) (diesel); 840 hp (630 kW) (electric motor)
- Propulsion: 2 × diesel engines; 2 × electric motors
- Speed: 14.25 knots (26.39 km/h; 16.40 mph) surfaced; 9 knots (17 km/h; 10 mph) submerged
- Range: 2,400 nmi (4,400 km; 2,800 mi) at 12.5 kn (23.2 km/h; 14.4 mph) surfaced
- Complement: 30
- Armament: 4 × 18-inch (45 cm) torpedo tubes; 1 × 21-inch (53.3 cm) torpedo tube

HMS G10 was a British G-class submarine built for the Royal Navy during World War I.

== Description ==
The G-class submarines were designed by the Admiralty in response to a rumour that the Germans were building double-hulled submarines for overseas duties. The submarines had a length of 187 feet 1 inch (57.0 m) overall, a beam of 22 feet 8 inches (6.9 m) and a mean draught of 13 feet 4 inches (4.1 m). They displaced 703 long tons (714 t) on the surface and 837 long tons (850 t) submerged. The G-class submarines had a crew of 30 officers and ratings. They had a partial double hull.

For surface running, the boats were powered by two 800-brake-horsepower (597 kW) Vickers two-stroke diesel engines, each driving one propeller shaft. When submerged each propeller was driven by a 420-horsepower (313 kW) electric motor. They could reach 14.25 knots (26.39 km/h; 16.40 mph) on the surface and 9 knots (17 km/h; 10 mph) underwater. On the surface, the G class had a range of 2,400 nautical miles (4,400 km; 2,800 mi) at 16 knots (30 km/h; 18 mph).

The boats were intended to be armed with one 21-inch (53.3 cm) torpedo tube in the bow and two 18-inch (45 cm) torpedo tubes on the beam. This was revised, however, while they were under construction, the 21-inch tube was moved to the stern and two additional 18-inch tubes were added in the bow. They carried two 21-inch and eight 18-inch torpedoes. The G-class submarines were also armed with a single 3-inch (7.6 cm) deck gun.

== Construction and career ==
Like the rest of her class, G10's role was to patrol an area of the North Sea in search of German U-boats. While on exercises, the submarine collided with a merchant vessel resulting in the destruction of the bridge and the periscopes. On 3 June 1916, following the Battle of Jutland, HMS Titania instructed G10 to locate and sink floating remains of Invincible to prevent the capture of materials. The submarine survived the war, and was sold for scrap in 1923.
