= Charles Ramsey (Royal Navy officer) =

Royal Navy Admiral (1882–1966)

Admiral Sir Charles Ramsey KCB
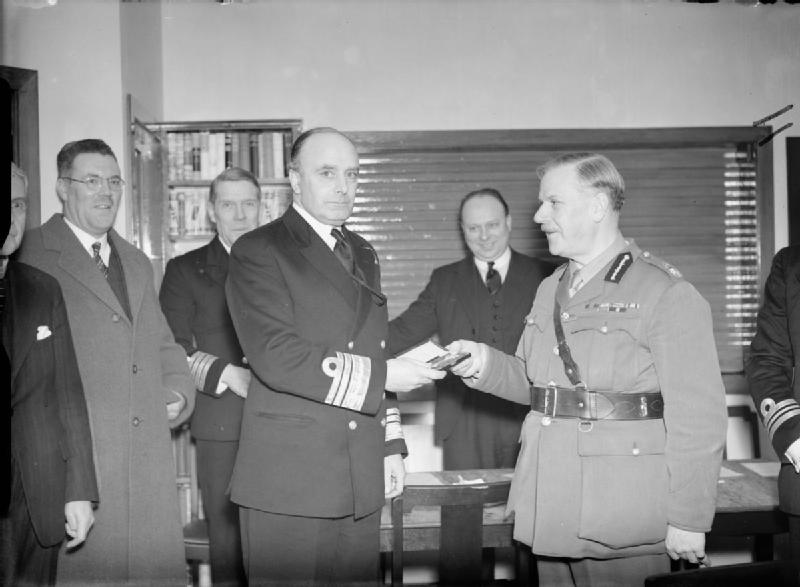
- Lord Elgin, the Lord Lieutenant of the County, presenting the golden key to the Commander in Chief, Vice Admiral Sir Charles Gordon Ramsey after the opening of the British Sailors Society Hostel, Rosyth, Fife
- Born: 4 December 1882; Southsea, Hampshire, UK
- Died: 19 December 1966 (aged 84); Martin, Florida, US
- Military career
- Allegiance: United Kingdom
- Branch: Royal Navy
- Service years: 1897–1942
- Rank: Admiral
- Commands: Rosyth
- Conflicts: World War I World War II
- Awards: Knight Commander of the Order of the Bath

Admiral Sir Charles Gordon Ramsey, KCB (4 December 1882 – 19 December 1966) was a Royal Navy officer who became Commander-in-Chief, Coast of Scotland. He was later appointed aide de camp to King George VI.

== Naval career ==
Ramsey joined the Royal Navy as a cadet in 1897. As a midshipman, he was posted to the protected cruiser HMS Charybdis in early 1900. He was promoted to lieutenant on 30 June 1904, and commander on 31 December 1915.

He served in World War I, at one time as captain of HMS Pasley, and was present at the Battle of Jutland while commanding HMS Acheron. He was appointed Commander of the 2nd Battle Squadron in 1935 and Commander-in-Chief, Rosyth in 1939, serving in that role during World War II until retirement in 1942. After his retirement from the Royal Navy, Ramsey served as a commodore commanding merchant convoys across the Atlantic.

== Family ==
In 1912, Ramsey married Lucy Clare Hancock; they had one child. He later married Helen Godley, who survived him upon his death.

Military offices
Preceded by Evelyn Thomson	Commander-in-Chief, Rosyth; 1939–1942	Succeeded by Sir Wilbraham Ford
