= French ship Médée =

5 ships of the French Navy have borne the name Médée in honour of Medea:

- Médée (1644), a fluyt
- Médée (1704), a 16-gun frigate
- Médée (1741), a 26-gun frigate
- Médée (1778), an Iphigénie-class 32-gun frigate.
- Frontin (1797), a Venetian 64-gun ship of the line taken into French service, also bore the name Médée
- Médée (1811), a 46-gun frigate
