= SS Auby =

History
- Name: (Kingdom of Italy) Rosario (1908-1920); (Belgium) Auby (1920-1925); (Raj of Sarawak) Auby (1925-1942)
- Owner: Sarawak & Singapore S. S. Co.
- Builder: Soc. Esercizio Bacini
- Yard number: 44
- Launched: 1908
- Completed: 1908
- Acquired: 1908
- Maiden voyage: 1908
- In service: 1908
- Out of service: 5 March 1942
- Identification: VSBD
- Fate: Scuttled

General characteristics
- Type: Cargo ship
- Tonnage: 636 GRT
- Length: 63.2 metres (207 ft 4 in)
- Beam: 10.4 metres (34 ft 1 in)
- Depth: 3 metres (9 ft 10 in)
- Installed power: 2 x 3 cyl. triple expansion steam engines
- Propulsion: Two screw propellers

SS Auby was a Sarawakian Cargo ship that was scuttled at Batavia, Netherlands East Indies on 5 March 1942 during the Battle of Java.

== Construction ==
Auby was built at the Soc. Esercizio Bacini shipyard in Riva Trigoso, Italy in 1908. Where she was launched and completed that same year. The ship was 63.2 metres (207 ft 4 in) long, had a beam of 10.4 metres (34 ft 1 in) and had a depth of 3 metres (9 ft 10 in). She was assessed at 636 GRT and had 2 x 3 cyl. triple expansion steam engines driving two screw propellers. The ship could generate 47 n.h.p..

== Sinking ==
Auby was scuttled at Batavia, Netherlands East Indies on 5 March 1942 during the Battle of Java to prevent her falling into Japanese possession, after having helped evacuate civilians from Singapore to Tanjung Priok.
