= HMS G4 =

British G-class submarine built for the Royal Navy during World War I

- HMS G4

History

United Kingdom
- Name: G4
- Builder: Chatham Dockyard
- Laid down: 12 October 1914
- Launched: 23 October 1915
- Commissioned: 3 February 1916
- Fate: Sold for scrap, 27 June 1928 to Cashmore, Newport.

General characteristics
- Class & type: G-class submarine
- Displacement: 703 long tons (714 t) surfaced; 837 long tons (850 t) submerged
- Length: 187 ft 1 in (57.0 m)
- Beam: 22 ft 8 in (6.9 m)
- Draught: 13 ft 4 in (4.1 m)
- Installed power: 1,600 bhp (1,200 kW) (diesel); 840 hp (630 kW) (electric motor)
- Propulsion: 2 × diesel engines; 2 × electric motors
- Speed: 14.25 knots (26.39 km/h; 16.40 mph) surfaced; 9 knots (17 km/h; 10 mph) submerged
- Range: 2,400 nmi (4,400 km; 2,800 mi) at 12.5 kn (23.2 km/h; 14.4 mph) surfaced
- Complement: 30
- Armament: 4 × 18-inch (45 cm) torpedo tubes; 1 × 21-inch (53.3 cm) torpedo tube

HMS G4 was a British G-class submarine built for the Royal Navy during World War I.

== Description ==
The G-class submarines were designed by the Admiralty in response to a rumour that the Germans were building double-hulled submarines for overseas duties. The submarines had a length of 187 feet 1 inch (57.0 m) overall, a beam of 22 feet 8 inches (6.9 m) and a mean draught of 13 feet 4 inches (4.1 m). They displaced 703 long tons (714 t) on the surface and 837 long tons (850 t) submerged. The G-class submarines had a crew of 30 officers and ratings. They had a partial double hull.

For surface running, the boats were powered by two 800-brake-horsepower (597 kW) Vickers two-stroke diesel engines, each driving one propeller shaft. When submerged, each propeller was driven by a 420-horsepower (313 kW) electric motor. They could reach 14.25 knots (26.39 km/h; 16.40 mph) on the surface and 9 knots (17 km/h; 10 mph) underwater. On the surface, the G class had a range of 2,400 nautical miles (4,400 km; 2,800 mi) at 16 knots (30 km/h; 18 mph).

The boats were intended to be armed with one 21-inch (53.3 cm) torpedo tube in the bow and two 18-inch (45 cm) torpedo tubes on the beam. This was revised, however, while they were under construction, the 21-inch tube was moved to the stern and two additional 18-inch tubes were added in the bow. They carried two 21-inch and eight 18-inch torpedoes. The G-class submarines were also armed with a single 3-inch (7.6 cm) deck gun.

== Career ==
After commissioning, G4 was sent to join 11th Submarine Flotilla at Blyth.

On 19 June 1916, G4 was patrolling in the Kattegat when she encountered the German merchant ship SS Ems, carrying a load of oil, zinc and copper plates from Oslo to Lübeck, and stopped her with a warning shot. Once the German ship's crew had abandoned ship, G4 fired two torpedo at Ems, both of which missed, and then sank the merchant ship with gunfire. A second German merchantman escaped to neutral Swedish waters. Sweden protested about the sinking of Ems, claiming that it took place within Swedish territorial waters, but Britain denied this. The dispute between Sweden and Britain about the sinking of Ems was still ongoing at the end of the war. At some point between 20 August 1916 and 3 October 1916, she went to Scapa Flow and left there to go to Murmansk (then called Romanov), arriving on 20 October 1916. She left there on 15 November, arriving in Kirkwall five days later. G4 then spent the rest of the First World War conducting patrols in the North Sea from Blyth, and was there at the time of the armistice.
