= SS Rastrello =

Cargo ship that was sunk in World War II

History
- Name: (United Kingdom) Navarre (1904-1911); (Norway) Atle Jarl (1911-1916); (German Empire) Atle Jarl (1916-1918); (Weimar Republic) Atle Jarl (1918-1922); (Weimar Republic) Barbara (1922-1925); (Kingdom of Yugoslavia) Morava (1925-1933); (France) Soussien (1933-1937); (Kingdom of Italy) Rastrello (1937-1940)
- Owner: Soc Ricuperi Marittima
- Port of registry: (Kingdom of Italy) Genoa, Italy
- Builder: Irvine's Shipbuilding & Drydock Co. Ltd.
- Yard number: 30
- Launched: 22 January 1904
- Completed: February 1904
- Acquired: February 1904
- Maiden voyage: February 1904
- In service: February 1904
- Out of service: 16 June 1940
- Identification: ISLQ; Official number: 2140
- Fate: Sunk in a British air raid

General characteristics
- Type: Cargo ship
- Tonnage: 1,249 GRT
- Length: 70.1 metres (230 ft 0 in)
- Beam: 10.4 metres (34 ft 1 in)
- Depth: 4.5 metres (14 ft 9 in)
- Installed power: 1 x 3 cyl. triple expansion engine
- Propulsion: Screw propeller
- Speed: 11 knots

SS Rastrello was an Italian cargo ship that was sunk in a British air raid on 16 June 1940 in Naples, Italy.

== Construction ==
Rastrello was built at the Irvine's Shipbuilding & Drydock Co. Ltd. shipyard in Hartlepool, United Kingdom in January 1904. Where she was launched and completed that same year. The ship was 70.1 metres (230 ft 0 in) long, had a beam of 10.4 metres (34 ft 1 in) and had a depth of 4.5 metres (14 ft 9 in). She was assessed at 1,249 GRT and had 1 x 3 cyl. triple expansion engine driving a screw propeller. The ship could reach a maximum speed of 11 knots and could generate 212 n.h.p. thanks to her two boilers.

== First World War Capture ==
Despite being built as the British cargo ship Navarre, Rastrello was sold to Norway for 900.000 NOK in 1911 alongside SS Narbonne and renamed Atle Jarl. She continued serving as a Norwegian ship during the first half of World War I before being captured as a prize by the German submarine SM U-78 in the North Sea 16 nautical miles (30 km) south-west of Norway on 21 October 1916, while she was travelling from Trondheim, Norway to Newcastle, United Kingdom with a stop over at Bergen, Norway while carrying general cargo. Rastrello (then Atle Jarl) was taken to Kiel, Germany and used by the Kaiserliche Marine as a headquarters for the defense of Kiel and as an accommodation ship for mine warfare research.

== Interbellum and First Sinking ==
After the war in 1919, Rastrello (at this time still named Atle Jarl) was again used as a cargo ship by the new German government with her home port in Hamburg, Germany. Disaster would strike Rastrello that same year as on 20 November 1919 she sank after hitting a mine near Öland, Sweden while she was on a voyage from Luleå, Sweden to Amsterdam, the Netherlands with a cargo of wood. She was refloated on 28 June 1920 and repaired, re-entering to service that same year.

== World War II and Final Sinking ==
Rastrello finally received her name when she was bought by Italy in May 1937 with her new homeport in Genoa, Italy. On 16 June 1940 Rastrello was moored in the port of Naples, Italy, when she was sunk by a torpedo fired accidentally by the torpedo boat Procione. There were no casualty.

== Wreck ==
The wreck of Rastrello was lifted and broken up not long after she sank.
