= HMS Meda =

Two vessels of the Royal Navy have borne the name HMS Meda:

- HMS Meda (1880) was a survey schooner launched in 1880 at Barnstaple and purchased that year by the Navy. She was sold in 1887 to the Government of Western Australia.
- HMS Meda (1943) was a Harbour Defence Motor Launch launched in 1943 at Bideford and previously known as SDML 3552, SDML 1301 and HDML 1301. The boat acted as a navigation marker during the invasion Elba in June 1944. After the Second World War she was used for survey work in the Mediterranean and English Channel, and renamed HMS Meda in 1949. The vessel was sold to a private individual in 1966.
