= SM U-78 =

History

German Empire
- Name: U-78
- Ordered: 6 January 1915
- Builder: AG Vulkan, Hamburg
- Yard number: 60
- Launched: 31 October 1915
- Commissioned: 26 January 1916
- Fate: Torpedoed and sunk, 27 October 1918

General characteristics
- Class & type: Type UE I submarine
- Displacement: 755 t (743 long tons) surfaced; 832 t (819 long tons) submerged
- Length: 56.80 m (186 ft 4 in) (o/a); 46.66 m (153 ft 1 in) (pressure hull)
- Beam: 5.90 m (19 ft 4 in) (o/a); 5.00 m (16 ft 5 in) (pressure hull)
- Height: 8.25 m (27 ft 1 in)
- Draught: 4.86 m (15 ft 11 in)
- Installed power: 2 × 900 PS (662 kW; 888 shp) surfaced; 2 × 900 PS (662 kW; 888 shp) submerged
- Propulsion: 2 shafts, 2× 1.41 m (4 ft 8 in) propellers
- Speed: 9.9 knots (18.3 km/h; 11.4 mph) surfaced; 7.9 knots (14.6 km/h; 9.1 mph) submerged
- Range: 7,880 nmi (14,590 km; 9,070 mi) at 7 knots (13 km/h; 8.1 mph) surfaced; 83 nmi (154 km; 96 mi) at 4 knots (7.4 km/h; 4.6 mph) submerged
- Test depth: 50 m (164 ft 1 in)
- Complement: 4 officers, 28 enlisted
- Armament: 2 × 50 cm (19.7 in) torpedo tubes (one port bow, one starbord stern); 4 torpedoes; 1 × 8.8 cm (3.5 in) SK L/30 deck gun

Service record
- Part of: I Flotilla; 9 July 1916 – 27 October 1918
- Commanders: Kptlt. Otto Dröscher; 20 April 1916 – 15 January 1918; Oblt.z.S. Karl Thouret; 16–31 January 1918; Oblt.z.S. Johann Vollbrecht; 1–27 February 1918; Kptlt. Karl Vesper; 1 March – 26 April 1918; Kptlt. Wilhelm Meyer; 27 April – 24 May 1918; Oblt.z.S. Johann Vollbrecht; 25 May – 27 October 1918
- Operations: 13 patrols
- Victories: 14 merchant ships sunk (26,278 GRT); 1 warship sunk (810 tons); 2 auxiliary warships sunk (400 GRT); 1 merchant ship damaged (7,869 GRT); 1 auxiliary warship damaged (3,463 GRT); 2 merchant ships taken as prize (3,427 GRT)

SM U-78 was one of the 329 submarines serving in the Imperial German Navy in World War I. U-78 was engaged in the naval warfare and took part in the First Battle of the Atlantic as a minelayer. On 27 October 1918 low frequency communications from U-78 in the Skagerrak were detected by the British submarine HMS G2 which sank her with the loss of her crew of 40. The commonly listed sinking date of 28 October 1918 is in error.

The wreck has been identified in April 2014.

== Original documents from Room 40 ==
The following is a verbatim transcription of the recorded activities of SM U-78 known to British Naval Intelligence, Room 40 O.B.:

SM U-78. Kptlt. Dröscher, later to U-117, but not before May 1917; then Kptlt. Vollbrecht. Was completed at Hamburg (Vulcan) in May 1916, joined the Kiel School and remained there until the 8th of July, when she went to Wilhelmshaven, and was attached to the 1st Half Flotilla.

- 11–27 July 1916. Left for the north. By about the 20th had laid 34 mines off Skerryvore. On the 23rd she was in action with the armed trawler CHRYSEA off Fair Island. Took 1 Danish S.S. as prize on the day before she returned to Heligoland.
- 20 August – 12 September 1916. Left, going northabout, for the south of Ireland and laid 34 mines off St. Govan’s Head on the night of the 1/2 September, and on the 27th August had chased S.S. FLOREAL off the Butt of Lewis. Returned northabout.
- 18–23 October 1916. Apparently on North Sea patrol. Stopped 6 Scandinavian S.S, allowing them to proceed. On last day out took as prize a Norwegian steamer.
- 29 October – 22 November 1916. Apparently went to coast of Norway to observe shipping; sank 1 Norwegian steamer.
- 3–22 February 1917. Laid mines at various points off the west coast of Scotland, going northabout both ways. Sank 1 steamer N. of Ireland, and possibly another N. of the Orkney Islands.
- 30 March – 19 April 1917. Went north, and watched the traffic on north coast of Ireland. Sand 3 S.S, 2 sailing vessels (6,500 tons). Laid mines in the Little Minch and Lough Swilly.
- 29 May – 22 June 1917. Went northabout and laid mines off Inishtrahull, and at points off the N.W. coast of Scotland. Was engaged by HMS HELGOLAND (a submarine trap) near Tory Island on 9 June. Claimed 5,000 tons sinkings. She asked permission to return by Little Belt, but was told for a special reason she must come in by Nordmands Tief.
- 27 July – 13 August 1917. Laid mines in Sound of Islay. Claimed 2,500 tons sinkings. Returned at slow speed owing to failure of port engine.
- She was to have gone out again in October 1917 but nothing is known of any cruise, and she was apparently not ready for service before June 1918.
- 16 June - ? 27 June 1918. Apparently laid mines east of Scotland.
- ? 14–21 July 1918. Left by the Kattegat, returned by the Bight. Had completed an unknown task in the North Sea by the 18th July.
- ? 19 August - ? 26 August 1918. In the North Sea. Made no report as to her undertaking, but returned at 3 knots with double motor trouble.
- 24 September – 1 October 1918. Laid mines on the east coast of Scotland.
- About the end of October 1918 she left to lay mines in the North Sea and was sunk by HM submarine G2 in 56°2′N 5°8′E"

Note: S.S. = Steam Ship; S.V. = Sailing Vessel; northabout, Muckle Flugga, Fair I. = around Scotland; Sound, Belts, Kattegat = via North of Denmark to/from German Baltic ports; Bight = to/from German North Sea ports; success = sinking of ships

== Summary of raiding history ==
Date	Name	Nationality	Tonnage (Note: Merchant ship tonnages are in gross register tons. Military vessels are listed by tons displacement.)	Fate
16 July 1916	Vidar	Sweden	2,178	Captured as prize
5 August 1916	Aranda	Norway	1,838	Sunk
2 September 1916	Kelvinia	United Kingdom	5,039	Sunk
26 September 1916	HMT Loch Shiel	Royal Navy	216	Sunk
21 October 1916	Atle Jarl	Norway	1,249	Captured as prize
16 November 1916	Vega	Norway	1,204	Sunk
13 December 1916	Kursk	Russia	7,869	Damaged
7 February 1917	Väring	Sweden	2,107	Sunk
13 February 1917	Barnsley	United Kingdom	144	Sunk
15 February 1917	Stralsund	Norway	510	Sunk
3 March 1917	Meldon	United Kingdom	2,514	Sunk
2 April 1917	Sagitta	Norway	1,981	Sunk
2 April 1917	HMS Tithonus	Royal Navy	3,463	Damaged
4 April 1917	Vladimir Reitz	Denmark	2,128	Sunk
5 April 1917	Bris	Denmark	101	Sunk
7 April 1917	HMS Jason	Royal Navy	810	Sunk
13 April 1917	Strathcona	Canada	1,881	Sunk
14 April 1917	Andromache	United Kingdom	313	Sunk
19 April 1917	HMT Lobelia	Royal Navy	184	Sunk
17 June 1917	Fornebo	United Kingdom	4,259	Sunk
13 December 1917	Arnewood	United Kingdom	2,259	Sunk

== See also ==
- Room 40

== Bibliography ==
- Gröner, Erich; Jung, Dieter; Maass, Martin (1991). U-boats and Mine Warfare Vessels. German Warships 1815–1945. Vol. 2. Translated by Thomas, Keith; Magowan, Rachel. London: Conway Maritime Press. ISBN 0-85177-593-4.
- Spindler, Arno (1966) [1932]. Der Handelskrieg mit U-Booten. 5 Vols. Berlin: Mittler & Sohn. Vols. 4+5, dealing with 1917+18, are very hard to find: Guildhall Library, London, has them all, also Vol. 1-3 in an English translation: The submarine war against commerce.
- Beesly, Patrick (1982). Room 40: British Naval Intelligence 1914-1918. London: H Hamilton. ISBN 978-0-241-10864-2.
- Halpern, Paul G. (1995). A Naval History of World War I. New York: Routledge. ISBN 978-1-85728-498-0.
- Roessler, Eberhard (1997). Die Unterseeboote der Kaiserlichen Marine. Bonn: Bernard & Graefe. ISBN 978-3-7637-5963-7.
- Schroeder, Joachim (2002). Die U-Boote des Kaisers. Bonn: Bernard & Graefe. ISBN 978-3-7637-6235-4.
- Koerver, Hans Joachim (2008). Room 40: German Naval Warfare 1914-1918. Vol I., The Fleet in Action. Steinbach: LIS Reinisch. ISBN 978-3-902433-76-3.
- Koerver, Hans Joachim (2009). Room 40: German Naval Warfare 1914-1918. Vol II., The Fleet in Being. Steinbach: LIS Reinisch. ISBN 978-3-902433-77-0.
