= HMS Pasley (1916) =

Admiralty M-class destroyer

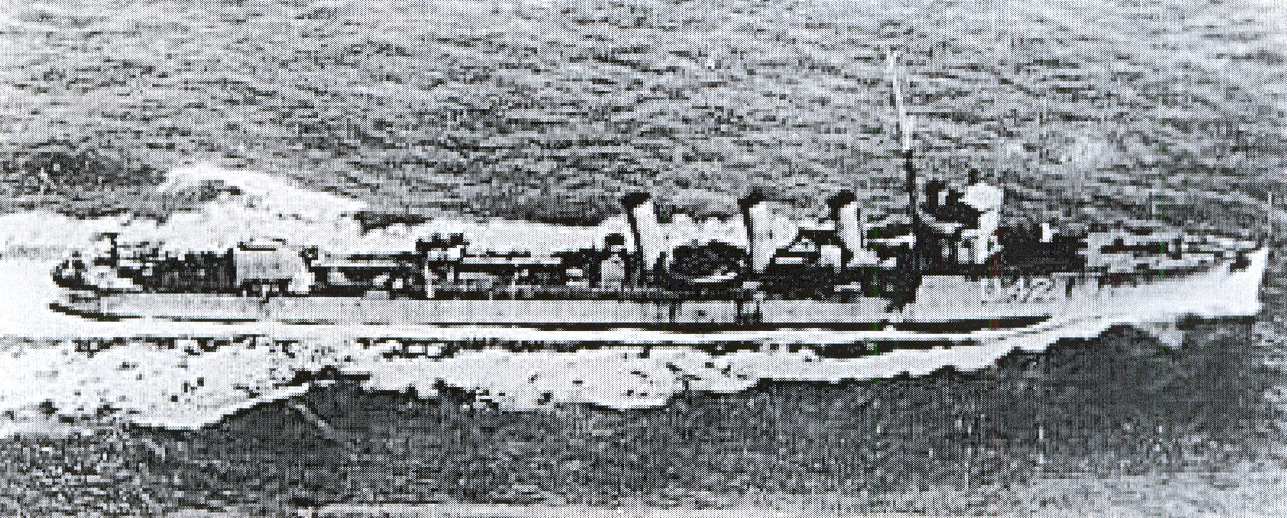
- HMS Pasley

History

United Kingdom
- Name: HMS Pasley
- Builder: Swan Hunter & Wigham Richardson
- Laid down: July 1915
- Launched: 15 April 1916
- Fate: Sold for scrap, 9 May 1921

General characteristics
- Class & type: Admiralty M-class destroyer
- Displacement: 994 long tons (1,010 t) standard; 1,042 long tons (1,059 t) full load
- Length: 269 ft (82 m)
- Beam: 27 ft 6 in (8.38 m)
- Draught: 8 ft 8 in (2.64 m) mean; 10 ft 6 in (3.20 m) maximum
- Propulsion: 3 shafts, steam turbines, 25,000 shp (18,642 kW)
- Speed: 34 knots (63 km/h; 39 mph)
- Range: 237–298 tons fuel oil
- Complement: 80
- Armament: 3 × QF 4 in (100 mm) Mark IV guns, mounting P Mk. IX; 2 × single QF 2 pdr "pom-pom" Mk. II; 2 × twin 21 inch (533 mm) torpedo tubes

HMS Pasley was an Admiralty M-class destroyer built on the Tyne by Swan Hunter & Wigham Richardson for the Royal Navy and launched on 15 April 1916. She saw service during the First World War.

== Description ==
The Admiralty M class were improved and faster versions of the preceding Laforey-class destroyer. They displaced 971 long tons (987 t). The ships had an overall length of 273 feet 4 inches (83.3 m), a beam of 26 feet 8 inches (8.1 m) and a draught of 9 feet 8 inches (2.9 m). They were powered by three Parsons direct-drive steam turbines, each driving one propeller shaft, using steam provided by four Yarrow boilers. The turbines developed a total of 25,000 shaft horsepower (19,000 kW) and gave a maximum speed of 34 knots (63 km/h; 39 mph). The ships carried a maximum of 237 long tons (241 t) of fuel oil that gave them a range of 2,100 nautical miles (3,900 km; 2,400 mi) at 15 knots (28 km/h; 17 mph). The ships' complement was 76 officers and ratings.

The ships were armed with three single QF 4-inch (102 mm) Mark IV guns and two QF 2-pounder (40 mm) "pom-pom" anti-aircraft guns. The ships were also fitted with two above water twin mounts for 21-inch (533 mm) torpedoes.

== Construction ==
Pasley was one of 16 Admiralty M-class destroyers ordered as part of the Fourth War Construction Programme in February 1915. She was laid down at Swan Hunter's Wallsend shipyard in July 1915, launched on 15 April 1916 and completed in July 1916.

== Service history ==
On commissioning, Pasley joined the Thirteenth Destroyer Flotilla, part of the Grand Fleet. On 18 August 1916, the German High Seas Fleet launched an attempt to draw out and destroy a section of the British Fleet. The British were aware of the German plan owing to radio intercepts, and the Grand Fleet set out to engage the German force, with the Thirteenth Destroyer Flotilla sailing with the Battlecruiser Force. No engagement between the opposing fleets occurred, but during the return voyage, at about 16:45 on 19 August, the light cruiser Falmouth was torpedoed twice by the German submarine U-66. Pasley, along with sister destroyers Negro and Pelican, was ordered to assist the stricken cruiser. Falmouth, escorted by the three destroyers, limped homeward under her own power, with the escort being reinforced by four more destroyers from the Fourth Destroyer Flotilla at about 23:00, with two tugs arriving from Immingham early on 20 August. The force had almost reached safety when the submarine U-63 hit Falmouth with two more torpedoes. Falmouth eventually sank about 5 miles off Flamborough Head.

=== Sinking of G9 ===
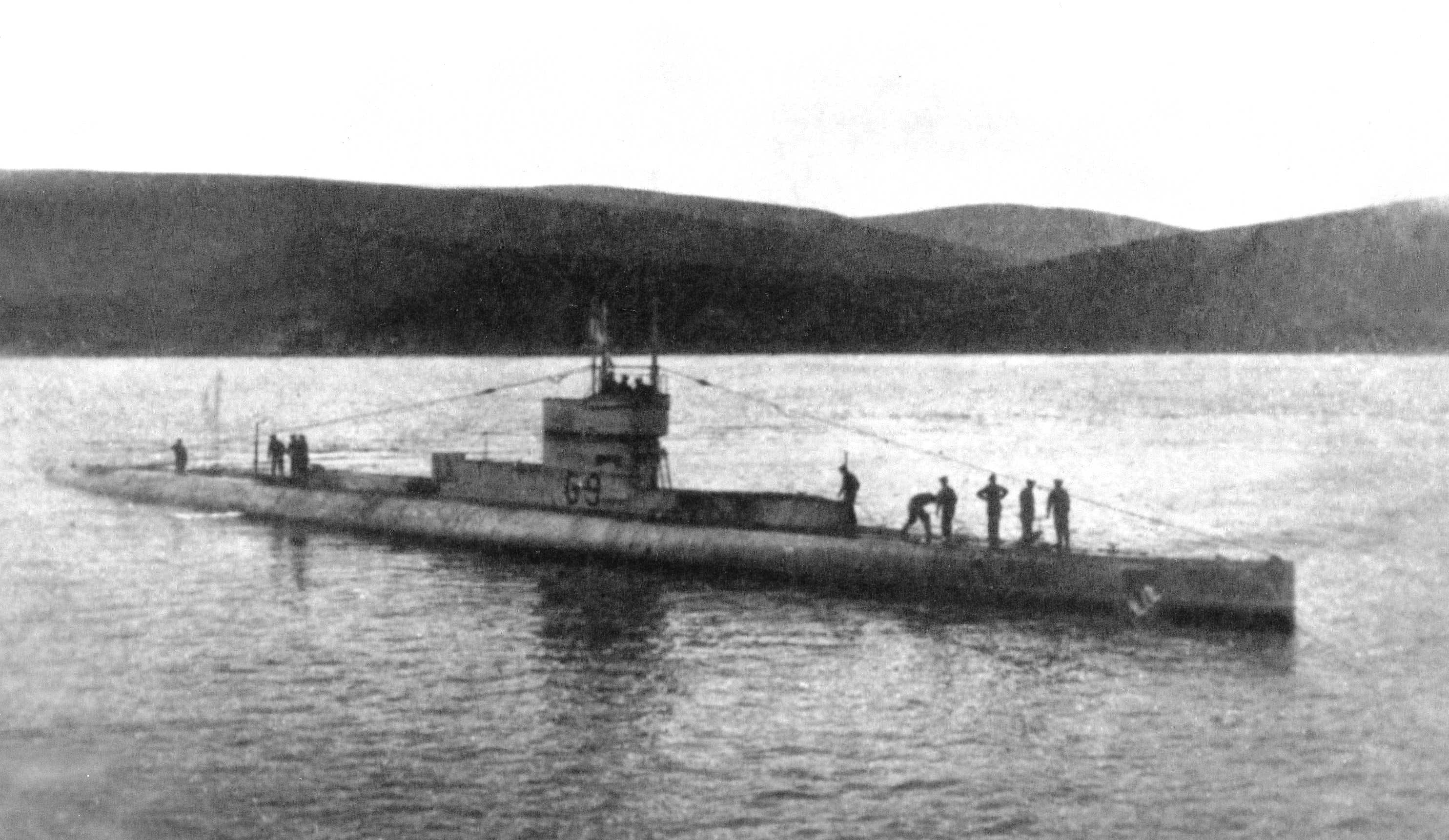
HMS G9

In foul weather on the night of 16 September 1917, whilst escorting a convoy from Aspö Fjord 100 km (62 mi) north of Bergen, Norway, to Lerwick, Pasley rammed and sank the submarine HMS G9, after G9 fired two torpedoes at her, believing her to be a German U-boat; one torpedo missed, the second failed to explode. Pasley stopped to pick up survivors, but only one member of G9's crew was saved, after Able Seaman Henry Old jumped from the destroyer into the sea to attach a running bowline around him, enabling him to be hauled aboard.

Pasley suffered extensive but not critical damage to her bows, and was able to continue her voyage to Lerwick; she was later repaired and returned to the fleet. At the Court of Inquiry held four days after the incident aboard HMS Indomitable at Scapa, it was decided no blame could be attached to Pasley, concluding "that the process of reasoning which led the captain of HM Submarine G9 to mistake HMS Pasley for a U-boat is, and must remain, unexplained".

Their Lords Commissioners of the Admiralty later directed the captain of Pasley, Commander Charles Gordon Ramsey, to inform the Officer of the Watch at the time of the incident, Midshipman Wallis, that in the opinion of the Court of Inquiry the action taken by him "was the right action to take under the circumstances, and that its result, so deeply to be regretted, is evidence that it was taken with commendable promptness and precision....". Commander Ramsey later rose to the rank of admiral; he retired in 1942, and was appointed aide de camp to King George VI. His portrait by Bassano is held by the National Portrait Gallery, London.

=== Final years ===
In November 1917, Pasley transferred to the Fourth Destroyer Flotilla, based at Devonport; she was sold for scrap on 9 May 1921.

== Bibliography ==
- Colledge, J. J.; Warlow, Ben (2006) [1969]. Ships of the Royal Navy: The Complete Record of All Fighting Ships of the Royal Navy from the 15th Century to the Present (3rd Rev ed.). London: Chatham Publishing. ISBN 978-1-86176-281-8. OCLC 67375475.
- Dittmar, F.J.; Colledge, J.J. (1972). British Warships 1914–1919. Shepperton, UK: Ian Allan. ISBN 0-7110-0380-7.
- Friedman, Norman (2009). British Destroyers: From Earliest Days to the Second World War. Barnsley, UK: Seaforth Publishing. ISBN 978-1-84832-049-9.
- Gardiner, Robert & Gray, Randal, eds. (1985). Conway's All The World's Fighting Ships 1906–1921. London: Conway Maritime Press. ISBN 0-85177-245-5.
- Massie, Robert K. (2007). Castles of Steel: Britain, Germany and the Winning of the Great War at Sea. London: Vintage Books. ISBN 978-0-099-52378-9.
- March, Edgar J. (1966). British Destroyers: A History of Development, 1892–1953; Drawn by Admiralty Permission From Official Records & Returns, Ships' Covers & Building Plans. London: Seeley Service. OCLC 164893555.
- Newbolt, Henry (1928). History of the Great War: Naval Operations:Vol IV. London: Longmans, Green and Co. OCLC 220475138.
