= Royal Australian Navy Submarine Force =

Submarine element of the Royal Australian Navy

Ship's badge of the RAN Submarine Service

The Royal Australian Navy Submarine Force (SUBFOR) is the submarine element of the Royal Australian Navy (RAN). The service currently forms the Navy's Submarine Force Element Group (FEG) and consists of six Collins class submarines.

The Royal Australian Navy Submarine Force has been established four times, with the initial three attempts being foiled by combat losses and Australia's economic problems. The modern Submarine Force was established in 1964, and has formed an important element of the Australian military's capacity since that date. While the Submarine Force has not seen combat since World War I, Australian submarines have conducted extensive surveillance operations throughout South East Asia.

== History ==
The Royal Australian Navy's submarine component has been established four times since 1914.

=== 1914–1945 ===
After the formation of the navy upon Federation, a period of uncertainty had followed as the size of the force to be established was determined. Eventually, this was set at 13 vessels, including three submarines. Initially, it had been intended to purchase three small submarines, but this order was later changed, and instead Australia's first submarines were the larger British E-class submarines AE1 and AE2. These submarines were built in Britain and arrived in Australia in 1914. Following the outbreak of World War I, both boats took part in the occupation of Rabaul in German New Guinea in September 1914. During this operation, AE1 disappeared on 14 September off Cape Gazelle, New Britain with the cause unknown. Its whereabouts was a mystery until it was located by searchers southeast of the Duke of York Islands on 20 December 2017.

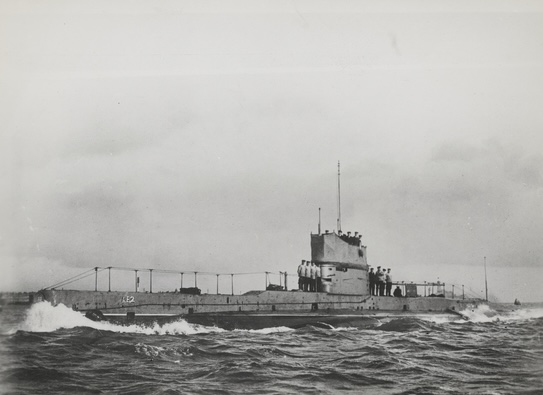
HMAS AE2

AE2 remained in the South Pacific until December 1914, when she was ordered to the Mediterranean to support the British-led operations off the Gallipoli peninsula in Turkey. AE2 was the first Empire submarine to penetrate the Dardanelles, achieving this task on 25 April 1915 (the day of the first landings at Gallipoli). AE2 operated in the Sea of Marmora for five days and made four unsuccessful attacks on Turkish ships before being damaged by a Turkish gunboat and scuttled by her crew on 30 April. These attacks are the only occasions an Australian submarine has fired in anger.

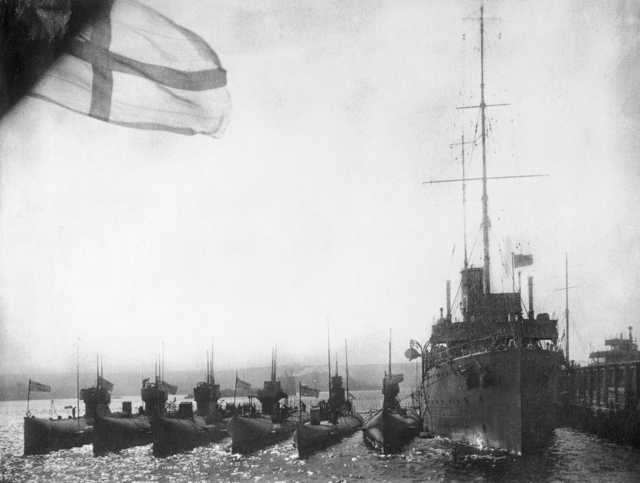
HMAS Platypus with all six J-class submarines

The Australian submarine service was reformed in 1919, when the British government transferred six J-class submarines to Australia; HMA Submarines J1, J2, J3, J4, J5, and J7. These submarines arrived in Australia with their tender HMAS Platypus in April 1919 and were based at Osborne House, Geelong from early 1920. The boats were in poor mechanical condition, however, and spent most of their service in refit. Due to Australia's worsening economic situation, all of the boats were decommissioned in 1922, and were scuttled later in the decade.

The Australian submarine service was established a third time in 1927, when the British O-class submarines HMAS Oxley and HMAS Otway were commissioned. These submarines sailed from Portsmouth for Sydney on 8 February 1928, but did not arrive in Australia until 14 February 1929; numerous mechanical problems delayed their delivery voyage. Due to Australia's poor economic situation, the O-class boats proved to be unaffordable and were placed in reserve in 1930, before transferring back to the Royal Navy in 1931. As a result, the Royal Australian Navy did not operate any submarines during World War II, though the obsolete Dutch submarine K.IX was commissioned as HMAS K9 on 22 June 1943 and was used for anti-submarine warfare training purposes. Due to the boat's poor mechanical condition K9 saw little service with the RAN and spent most of her time in commission under repair, before being decommissioned on 31 March 1944 due to a lack of spare parts.

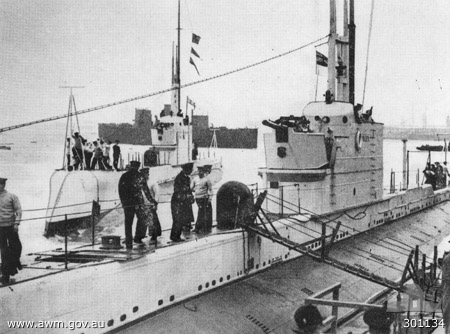
HMAS Oxley and Otway

The Australian ports of Fremantle and Brisbane were important bases for Allied submarines during World War II. A total of 122 United States Navy, 31 Royal Navy, and 11 Royal Netherlands Navy submarines conducted patrols from Australian bases between 1942 and 1945. Fremantle was the second largest Allied submarine base in the Pacific Theatre after Pearl Harbor, Hawaii.

=== 1945–present ===
Following World War II, the Royal Navy's 4th Submarine Flotilla was based in Sydney from 1949 until 1969. The flotilla, which varied in size between two and three boats, was used to support the Royal Australian Navy and Royal New Zealand Navy in anti-submarine warfare training, with the operating cost split between the two nations. In the early 1960s, the British Government advised the Australian Government that reductions in the Royal Navy conventional submarine force meant that the 4th Flotilla was to return to the United Kingdom. The impending withdrawal of the British submarine flotilla sparked the fourth attempt to establish an Australian submarine service. While the Department of Defence advised the government that three to six submarines should be purchased for training purposes, following the intervention of then-Senator John Gorton the Government instead approved the purchase of eight submarines to form a submarine strike force. Eight British Oberon-class submarines were ordered in 1964, to be built in Scotland in two batches of four boats. Only six boats were delivered; the seventh and eighth were cancelled in 1971 to fund the acquisition of ten A-4 Skyhawk aircraft for the Fleet Air Arm. The final Royal Navy submarine to be based in Australia, HMS Trump, was withdrawn in 1969.

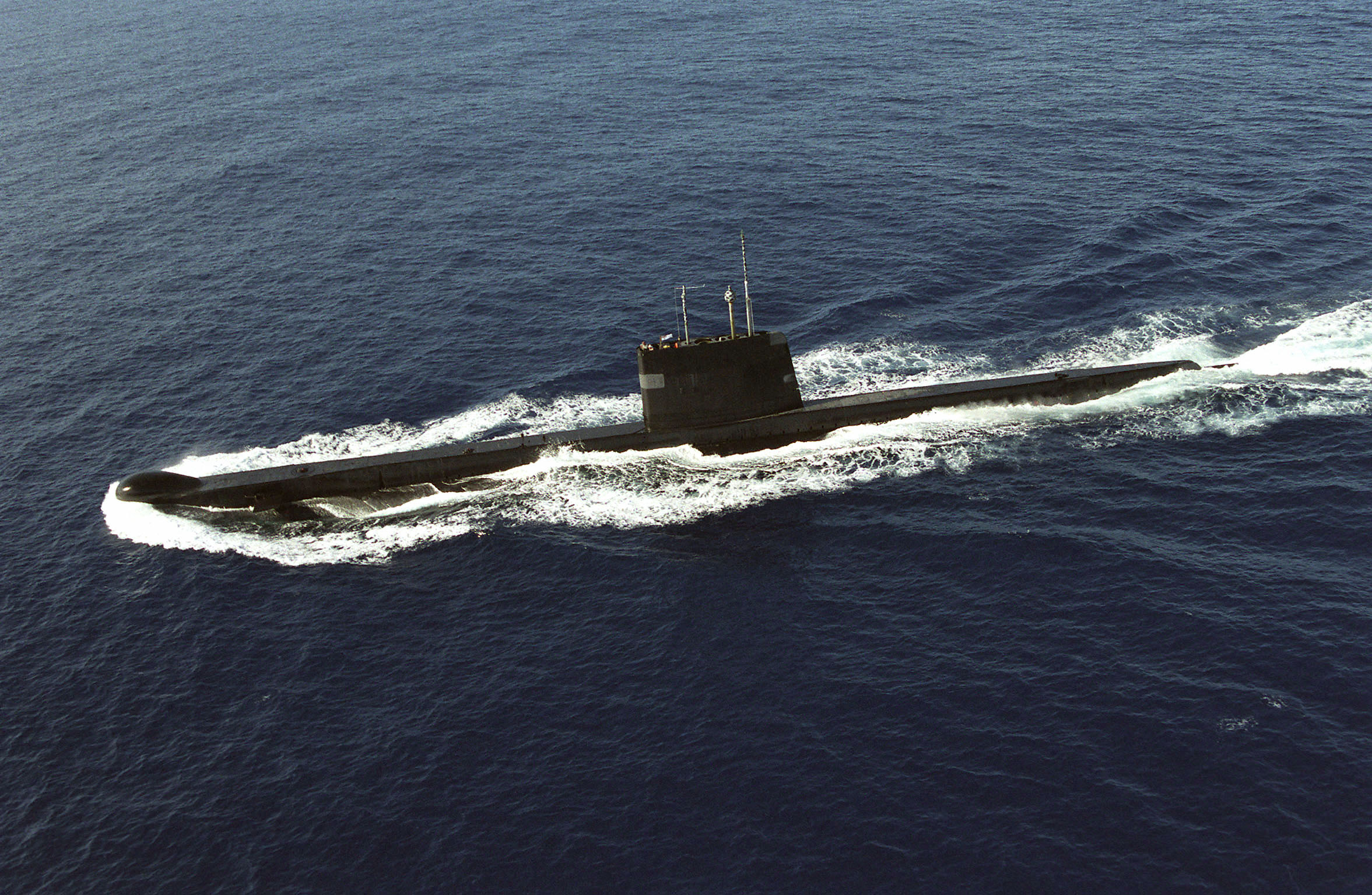
HMAS Onslow in 1998

The first Australian Oberon-class submarine, HMAS Oxley, was commissioned on 21 March 1967. She was followed by her sister ships; Otway (1968), Ovens (1969), Onslow (1969), Orion (1977), and Otama (1978). Orion and Otama were more capable than the previous four boats, as they were fitted with advanced communications monitoring equipment. All of the Oberon-class submarines were based at HMAS Platypus, on Sydney Harbor. The Oberons proved very successful and saw extensive service during the last decades of the Cold War. This service included conducting risky surveillance missions against India and Communist nations in South East Asia. These missions were cancelled in 1992 when an Australian submarine, believed to be Otama, became tangled in fishing nets and was forced to surface in the South China Sea. (Note: According to one source Australian submarines are reported to have conducted approximately 20 such patrols between 1977 and 1992.) The Oberon class regularly conducted exercises with the Special Air Service Regiment (SAS) and to a lesser extent the 1st Commando Regiment and the Clearance Diving Branch. In 1980, the SAS was tasked to develop a maritime counter terrorist capability together with the clearance divers and conducted the first ever swimmer release from a submerged Australian submarine. Onslow was fitted with a four-man diving chamber for exit and reentry of SAS swimmers. As part of the Government's Two Ocean Navy policy submarines were homeported at HMAS Stirling in Western Australia from 1987 and the headquarters of the Australian Submarine Squadron moved to HMAS Stirling in 1994. The Oberon class boats were gradually decommissioned and replaced with new Collins-class submarines during the 1990s. The final Oberon-class boat, HMAS Otama, was decommissioned on 15 December 2000.

The six Collins-class submarines were the first Australian-built submarines, and the most expensive ships to have been built in Australia. The Collins-class submarines were built by the Australian Submarine Corporation at Adelaide, South Australia and entered service between 1996 and 2003 following extensive trials and modifications to the early boats in the class. The dedicated trials and submarine rescue ship HMAS Protector supported these trials between 1992 and 1998. Tests conducted on HMAS Collins after she was provisionally commissioned in 1996 revealed serious shortcomings in the submarine's performance, including excessive hull noise and an ineffective combat system. These problems were subsequently rectified. The second boat commissioned was Farncomb (1998) followed by Waller (1999), Dechaineux (2001), Sheean (2001) and Rankin (2003). The Collins-class submarines currently rank among the most effective conventional submarines in the world.

Like the Oberon-class, the Collins-class submarines have conducted surveillance patrols. In 1999, it was reported that Waller and a second boat operated in support of the International Force for East Timor (INTERFET) providing escorts for transport ships, monitoring Indonesian communications, inserting special forces and had been collecting intelligence on East Timor for months. Two boats, Collins and Dechaineux, received the special forces upgrade providing the capability while submerged to release several swimmers and for their reentry, filling a capability gap the former Oberon-class boat Onslow had provided. While the Collins-class submarines' performance has improved over time, their maximum diving depth was permanently reduced following the near-loss of Dechaineux when a pipe burst during a practice dive in February 2003.

In 1998, the Royal Australian Navy became the fourth Navy in the world to permit women to serve on board submarines. The first female submariners began their training at the Submarine Training and Systems Centre in June 1998.

Sometime in 2024 or early 2025, the Royal Australian Navy Submarine Service was officially renamed as the Submarine Force (SUBFOR).

== Today ==
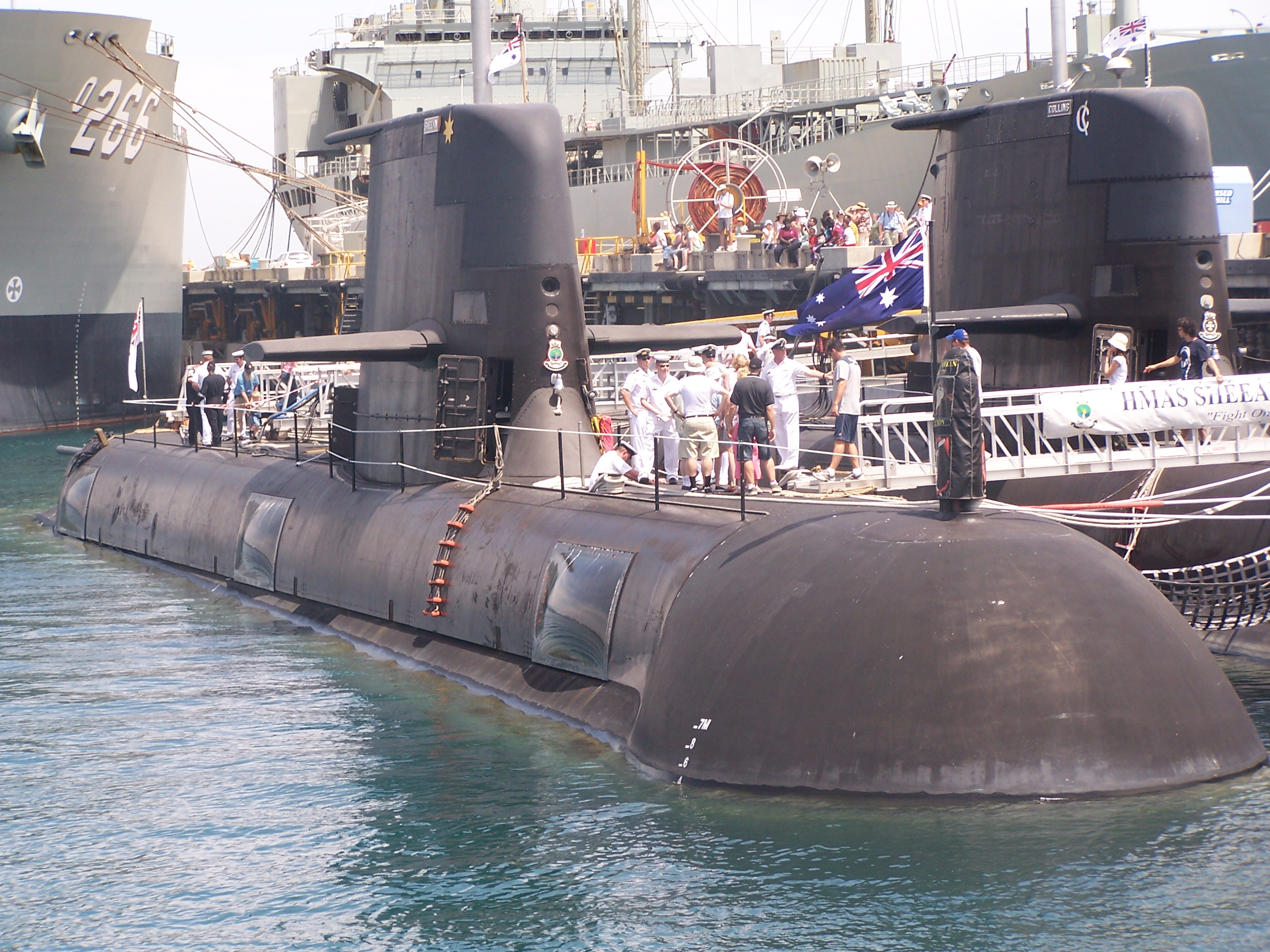
HMAS Sheean (front left) and HMAS Collins (front right) at HMAS Stirling in 2006

The Royal Australian Navy Submarine Force Element Group Headquarters, and all six of the Collins-class submarines, are located at HMAS Stirling located on Garden Island, near Perth. The majority of the Navy's submarine support facilities are also located at HMAS Stirling, including the Submarine Escape Training Facility. The LR5 submersible, which is contracted to provide the RAN's submarine rescue capability, has been based at nearby Henderson, Western Australia since June 2009.

Under current Royal Australian Navy doctrine, the Submarine Force has the following responsibilities:

- intelligence collection and surveillance;
- maritime strike and interdiction;
- barrier operations;
- advanced force operations;
- layered defense;
- interdiction of shipping;
- containment by distraction; and
- support to operations on land

In early 2007, it was reported that Submarine Force was experiencing severe shortfalls in personnel and had only 70% of its authorised strength of 500 sailors. These shortfalls were reported to have reduced the force's operational readiness and forced HMAS Collins to be temporarily withdrawn from service.

The RAN utilises Saab AUV62-AT autonomous anti-submarine warfare (ASW) training targets, and ordered an additional vehicle in September 2025.

== Future submarines ==
The Collins-class submarines will begin to reach the end of their useful life from 2026. To meet the in-service date of 2026, advanced design work on the next generation of Australian submarines began in 2014. At this very early stage, it appeared that the submarines would be Australian-built conventional submarines equipped with air independent propulsion and advanced combat and communications systems.

In September 2013, Rear Admiral Greg Sammut was appointed as Head Future Submarine Program.

In 2016, France won a contract to build a conventionally powered variant of its Barracuda class for Australia.

In September 2021, the Australian government announced that the deal with France had been cancelled, and that Australia would be working with the United States and the United Kingdom to acquire at least eight conventionally-armed, nuclear powered submarines as part of the new AUKUS security partnership.

In March 2023, the trilateral Australian-British-American AUKUS security pact announced that the RAN would purchase three Virginia class submarines as a stopgap measure between the retirement of their conventionally powered Collins-class submarines and the acquisition of five future SSN-AUKUS class submarines. If SSN-AUKUS falls behind schedule, Australia will have the option of purchasing two additional Virginia-class submarines.

Three prototype autonomous underwater vehicles were ordered for the RAN in May 2022, designated the Ghost Shark. The first prototype was publicly revealed in April 2024, with full rate production expected by the end of 2025 and service entry from early 2026.

== Dolphin badge ==
Australian sailors who qualify as submariners are awarded a badge depicting two dolphins and a crown. This badge (known as a sailor's 'dolphins') was designed by Commander Alan McIntosh RAN, and was introduced in 1966; a similar badge was adopted by the Royal Navy Submarine Service in 1972.

== Leadership ==
=== Submarine Force ===
Name	Post- nominals	Term began	Term ended	Notes
Commodore Daniel Sutherland		December 2024	Incumbent	

== See also ==
- Future of the Royal Australian Navy
- Submarines in the United States Navy
- List of submarine operators
