= Edward Courtney Boyle =

Recipient of the Victoria Cross (1883–1967)

Rear-Admiral Edward Courtney Boyle VC
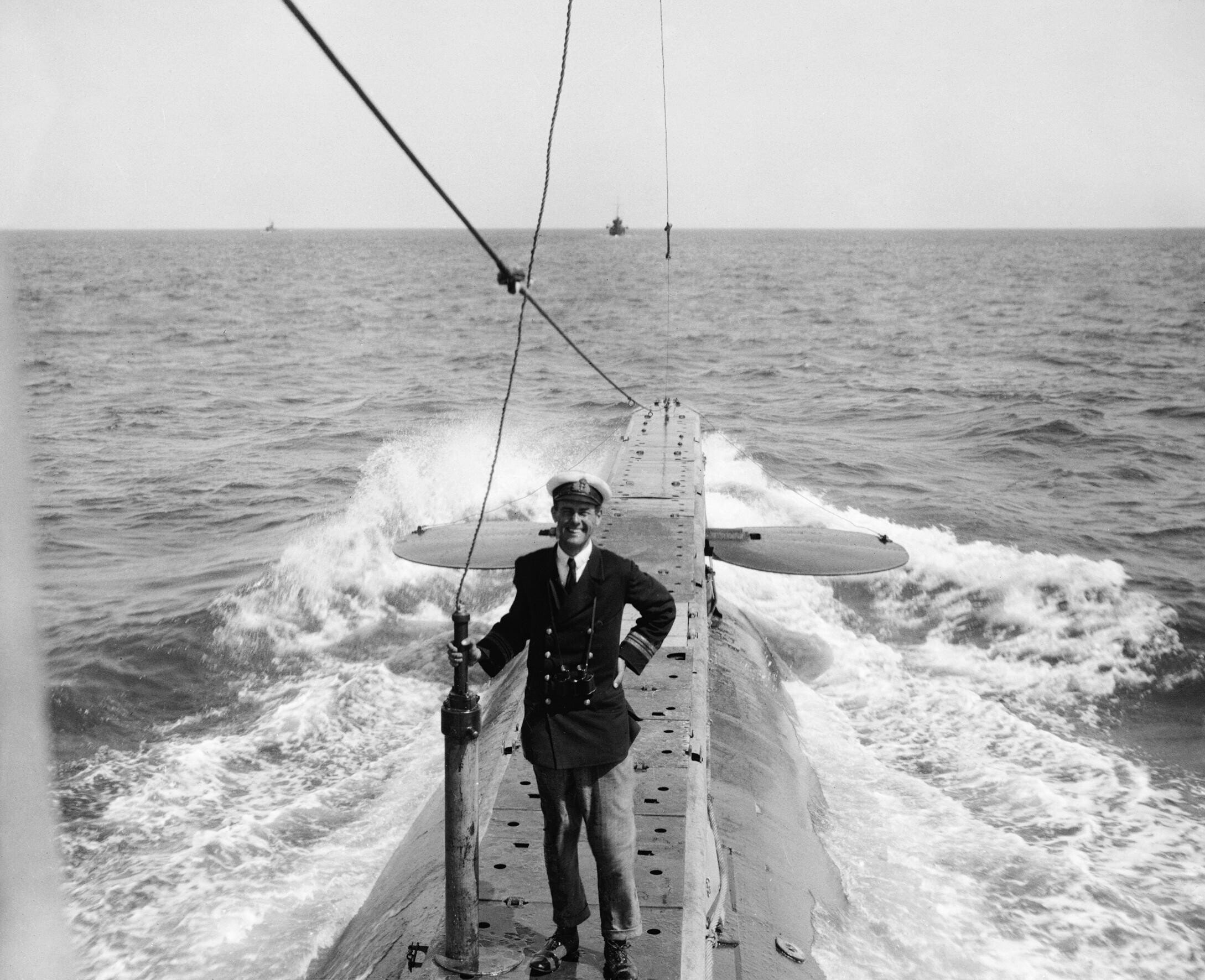
- Commander Boyle aboard HMS E14. Photo by Ernest Brooks
- Born: 23 March 1883; Carlisle, Cumberland, England
- Died: 16 December 1967 (aged 84); Ascot, Berkshire, England
- Burial place: Woking Crematorium, Surrey, England
- Military career
- Allegiance: United Kingdom
- Branch: Royal Navy
- Service years: 1897–1932; 1939–1943
- Rank: Rear-Admiral
- Commands: Flag Officer-In-Charge, London (1939–42); HMS Iron Duke (1929–31); HMS Carysfort (1924–25); HMS Birmingham (1923); HMAS Platypus (1918–20); HMS J5 (1916–18); HMS E14 (1914–16); HMS D3 (1914); HMS D2 (1911–13); HMS C29 (1910–11); HMS C4 (c.1907–08)
- Conflicts: First World War; Second World War
- Awards: Victoria Cross; Mentioned in Despatches; Order of Saints Maurice and Lazarus (Italy); Legion of Honour (France)

Rear-Admiral Edward Courtney Boyle, VC (23 March 1883 – 16 December 1967) was a Royal Navy officer and an English recipient of the Victoria Cross, the highest award for gallantry in the face of the enemy that can be awarded to British and Commonwealth forces.

== Early life ==
Edward Courtney Boyle, "one of the most distinguished submariners of his generation", was born on 23 March 1883 in Carlisle, then part of Cumberland, and educated at Cheltenham College.

== Naval career ==
Boyle joined the Royal Navy, and HMS Britannia, in 1897. He joined the submarine service in July 1904 when he was sent to the depot ship HMS Thames. He was soon promoted lieutenant and given command of one of the Holland-class submarines. He served in the surface fleet on HMS Ocean from November 1908 until January 1910 when he returned to submarines.

Boyle was 32 years old, and a lieutenant commander in the Royal Navy during the First World War when the following deed took place for which he was awarded the VC, the citation was gazetted on 21 May 1915:

Admiralty, 21st May, 1915.

The KING has been graciously pleased to approve of the grant of the Victoria Cross to Lieutenant-Commander Edward Courtney Boyle, Royal Navy, for the conspicuous act of bravery specified below:

For most conspicuous bravery, in command of Submarine E. 14, when he dived his vessel under the enemy minefields and entered the Sea of Marmora on the 27th April, 1915. In spite of great navigational difficulties from strong currents, of the continual neighbourhood of hostile patrols, and of the hourly danger of attack from the enemy, he continued to operate in the narrow waters of the Straits and succeeded in sinking two Turkish gunboats and one large military transport.

The large transport sunk by E14 was the Gul Djemal, which was sunk in shallow waters with the loss of 2000 troops and a battery of artillery. Its sinking ended Ottoman attempts to reinforce Gallipoli by sea. In addition to Boyle's VC, Edward Geldard Stanley and Acting Lieutenant Reginald Wilfred Lawrence were both awarded the Distinguished Service Cross and all the ratings were awarded the Distinguished Service Medal.

Boyle made at least two more tours into the Sea of Marmara aboard E14 during the Gallipoli campaign.

== Personal life ==
Boyle married Marjorie Leigh in Marylebone, London in 1912.

== Later life ==
Boyle retired with the rank of rear admiral in 1932, but was recalled to serve in the Second World War. He served as Flag Officer-in-Charge, London, from 1939 to 1942.

In December 1967 Boyle was knocked down by a lorry driver on a pedestrian crossing and died of his injuries. For the last few years before his death he had resided at the Station Hotel in Sunningdale, near to Sunningdale Golf Club, where he golfed several times a week. The collision occurred a hundred yards from his hotel whilst he was crossing the A30.

His VC is displayed at the Royal Navy Submarine Museum, Gosport, Hampshire.

== Bibliography ==
- Snelling, Stephen (2012) [1995]. Gallipoli. VCs of the First World War. The History Press. ISBN 978-0752456539.
- Hough, Richard (2001). The Great War at Sea: 1914–1918. Birlinn. ISBN 1841580538.
