= HMS Orpheus (1916) =

British M-Class destroyer

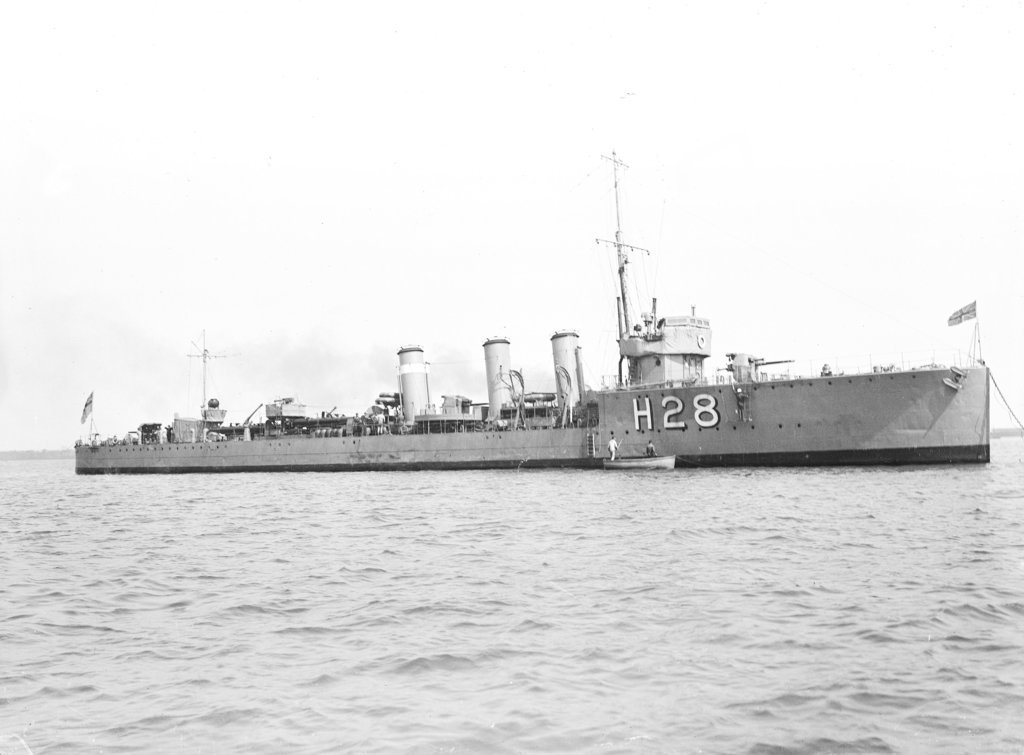
- Orpheus in 1918

History

United Kingdom
- Name: HMS Orpheus
- Namesake: Orpheus
- Ordered: November 1914
- Builder: Doxford, Sunderland
- Launched: 17 June 1916
- Completed: September 1916
- Out of service: 1 November 1921
- Fate: Sold to be broken up

General characteristics
- Class & type: Admiralty M-class destroyer
- Displacement: 950 long tons (970 t) normal; 1,021 long tons (1,037 t) full load
- Length: 265 ft (80.77 m) p.p.
- Beam: 26 ft 9 in (8.15 m)
- Draught: 16 ft 3 in (4.95 m)
- Propulsion: 3 Yarrow boilers; 2 Brown-Curtis steam turbines, 25,000 shp (19,000 kW)
- Speed: 34 knots (63.0 km/h; 39.1 mph)
- Range: 3,450 nmi (6,390 km; 3,970 mi) at 15 kn (28 km/h; 17 mph)
- Complement: 76
- Armament: 3 × QF 4 in (102 mm) Mark IV guns (3×1); 1 × 2-pounder (40 mm) "pom-pom" Mk. II anti-aircraft gun (1×1); 4 × 21 in (533 mm) torpedo tubes (2×2)

HMS Orpheus was a Repeat Admiralty M-class destroyer which served in the Royal Navy during the First World War. The M class were an improvement on the previous L-class, capable of higher speed. The vessel was launched on 17 June 1916 and joined the Grand Fleet. Orpheus spent much of the war undertaking anti-submarine warfare patrols in the North Sea and escorting convoys across the Atlantic Ocean. In 1917, the destroyer was involved in a friendly fire incident with the British submarine J1. After the Armistice that marked the end of the First World War, the destroyer joined the Home Fleet. However, this role did not last long and the destroyer was deemed superfluous to requirements. Soon after, Orpheus was placed in reserve, decommissioned and, on 1 November 1921, sold to be broken up.

== Design and development ==
Orpheus was one of twenty-two Repeat Admiralty M-class destroyer destroyers ordered by the British Admiralty in November 1914 as part of the Third War Construction Programme. The M-class was an improved version of the earlier L-class destroyer destroyers, originally envisaged to reach the higher speed of 36 knots (67 km/h; 41 mph) in order to counter rumoured German fast destroyers, although the eventual specification was designed for a more economic 34 knots (63 km/h; 39 mph). The Repeat M class differed from the prewar vessels in having a raked stem and design improvements based on wartime experience.

The destroyer was 265 feet (80.77 m) long between perpendiculars, with a beam of 26 feet 9 inches (8.15 m) and a draught of 16 feet 3 inches (4.95 m). Displacement was 950 long tons (970 t) normal and 1,021 long tons (1,037 t) deep load. Power was provided by three Yarrow boilers feeding two Brown-Curtis steam turbines rated at 25,000 shaft horsepower (19,000 kW) and driving two shafts. Three funnels were fitted and 296 long tons (301 t) of oil was carried, giving a design range of 3,450 nautical miles (6,390 km; 3,970 mi) at 15 knots (28 km/h; 17 mph).

Armament consisted of three single 4-inch (102 mm) Mk IV QF guns on the ship's centreline, with one on the forecastle, one aft on a raised platform and one between the middle and aft funnels. A single 2-pounder (40 mm) pom-pom anti-aircraft gun was carried, while torpedo armament consisted of two twin mounts for 21 in (533 mm) torpedoes. The ship had a complement of 76 officers and ratings.

== Construction and career ==
Laid down at their shipyard in Sunderland, Orpheus was launched by William Doxford & Sons on 17 June 1916 and completed during September. The destroyer was the sixth Royal Navy ship to be named after Orpheus, the poet in Greek mythology that travelled to the world of Hades in search of Eurydice. The vessel was deployed as part of the Grand Fleet, joining the Thirteenth Destroyer Flotilla at Scapa Flow.

The destroyer was active in anti-submarine warfare but with variable results. On 18 January 1917, Orpheus was one of six destroyers that undertook patrols termed "high speed sweeps" in the North Sea using paravanes. No submarines were sighted. The destroyer did spot a submarine on 19 March while on patrol and attacked with gunfire, the shells narrowly missing the conning tower. However, the victim was the British boat J1 and the friendly fire incident led to a reassessment of the advice given to submarines. The Admiralty identified that the patrols were not as successful as they needed and so withdrew destroyers like Orpheus to focus on the more effective convoy model. The destroyer was escorting a convoy of five empty oilers returning to Texas when one, SS Oakleaf, was torpedoed by the submarine UC-41 on 25 July.

After the armistice, the Grand Fleet was disbanded and Orpheus temporarily joined the Fourth Destroyer Flotilla of the Home Fleet. However, the harsh conditions of wartime service, exacerbated by the fact that the hull was not galvanised and operations often required high speed in high seas, meant that the destroyer was worn out. When the Royal Navy returned to a peacetime level of mobilisation, Orpheus was declared superfluous to operational requirements. The destroyer was initially transferred to Chatham on 15 October 1919 and placed in reserve. However, this position did not last long. Orpheus was decommissioned, sold to Fryer on 1 November 1921 and returned to Sunderland to be broken up.

== Pennant numbers ==
Pennant number	Date
G43	September 1915
F17	January 1917
F35	January 1918
H28	March 1918
F87	January 1919
