= J-class submarine =

1915 class of British submarines

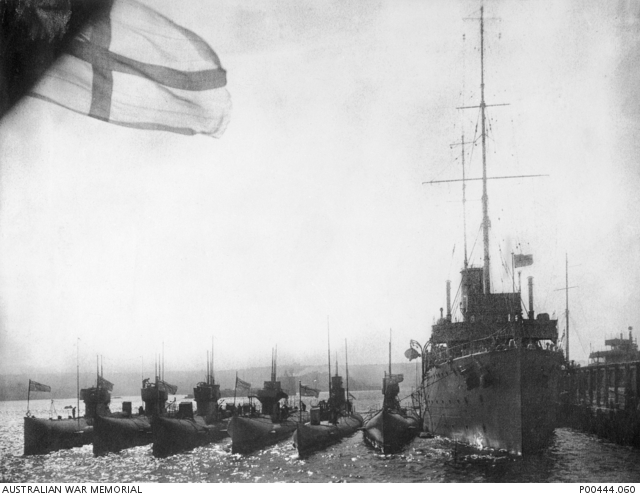
- Six J-class subs next to their supply ship HMAS Platypus in 1919

Class overview
- Name: J class
- Operators: Royal Navy; Royal Australian Navy
- In commission: 1916–1930
- Planned: 8
- Completed: 7
- Canceled: 1
- Lost: 1
- Scrapped: 6
- Preserved: 1 (J7 is extant as a breakwater)

General characteristics (original design)
- Type: Submarine
- Displacement: 1,210 tons (surfaced); 1,760 tons (submerged)
- Length: 274 ft (84 m)
- Beam: 23 ft 1 in (7.04 m)
- Draught: 14 ft (4.3 m)
- Propulsion: Three shafts; Surfaced – 3 × 12-cylinder diesel engines (3,600 hp); Submerged – 2 × battery-driven electric motors (1,350 hp)
- Speed: 19 knots (35 km/h) (surfaced); 9.5 knots (17.6 km/h) (submerged)
- Range: 91 tons Diesel Oil for5,000 nautical miles (9,000 km) at 12.5 knots (23 km/h)
- Test depth: 300 feet (91 m)
- Complement: 5 officers, 40 seamen
- Armament: 6 × 18 in (460 mm) torpedo tubes (4 bow, 2 beam); 1 × 4 in (102 mm) gun

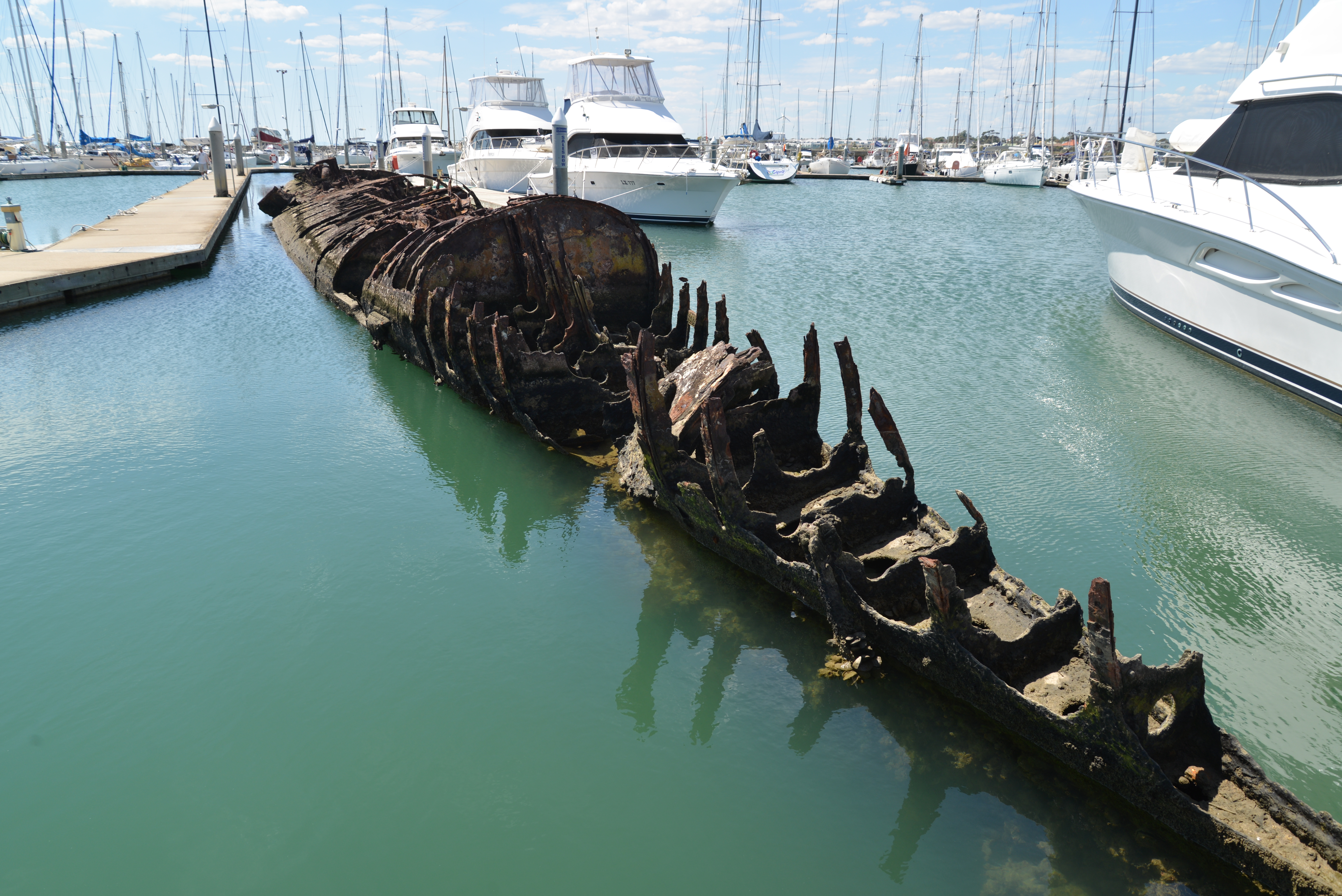
Wreck of HMAS J7 at Sandringham Yacht Club marina

The J-class submarines were seven submarines developed by the Royal Navy prior to the First World War in response to claims that Germany was developing submarines that were fast enough to operate alongside surface fleets. Six were completed during mid-1916, while a seventh entered service at the end of 1917.

Although larger and more powerful than previous British submarines, the J class could not keep up with surface vessels, and operated independently during the war. Between them, the submarines sank a U-boat, and heavily damaged two battleships, with the loss of HMS J6 to friendly shelling.

Following the war, the six surviving submarines were gifted to the Royal Australian Navy (RAN). All six were paid off during the 1920s. Two were scuttled as breakwaters in Port Phillip Bay, and four were scuttled in the ship graveyard off Port Phillip heads.

== Design ==
Shortly before the First World War, incorrect reports reached the British fleet that the Germans were planning a class of fast submarines for operation with the fleet, and British efforts turned toward provision of similar vessels. The driving requirement would be a surface speed that matched the speed of the battlefleet. In order to meet the requirement, the DNC designed a three shaft submarine that was 100-foot (30 m) longer than the E class, with electric motors confined to the two outer shafts and a hull form based on a light cruiser. This resulted in a diesel-electric design that was unique within the Royal Navy.

The power requirement was 1,200 horsepower (890 kW) per diesel engine. In order to meet this power requirement, Vickers, the pre-eminent builder of submarine diesels in First World War Britain, elected to produce a 12-cylinder version of their previously successful 100 brake horsepower (75 kW) per cylinder six- and eight- cylinder engines for the D and E classes respectively. They retained the 14.5-by-15-inch (368 by 381 mm) bore and stroke of these previous engines and produced 1,200 shaft horsepower at 380 revolutions per minute. These engines eventually went into the J, L and M-class submarines.

The design featured four bow tubes and two beam tubes for 18-inch (457 mm) torpedoes; they were the first British submarines to carry four bow tubes. Although designed to reach 19.5 knots (36 km/h), the boats could only practically travel at 19 knots (35 km/h), making them too slow for fleet use. The quest for fleet submarine performance turned toward the subsequent, steam powered K class. The endurance of the J class was considerably greater than previous submarines.

Eight boats were originally ordered, although two were later cancelled, while a seventh was later reordered to a slightly modified design. The first six were laid down between March and May 1915, with J7 laid down in August 1916. The six early boats were completed between April and August 1916, and J7 in November 1917.

== Operational history ==
=== Royal Navy ===
The first boat, HMS J4 was commissioned at the height of the war on 17 July 1916 and assigned to the 11th Submarine Flotilla at Blyth in Northumberland, where it was soon joined by the others. These large submarines with their high speed and formidable armament were considered prestige commands, and their early commanders included such notables as Nasmith, Boyle, and Horton.

The J-class submarines took part in activities against German surface vessels and German submarines both off the Tyne and Gibraltar. On 5 November 1916, HMS J1 sighted a group of four German battleships at a range of 4,000 yards (3,700 m). The boat fired a four-torpedo salvo, of which two struck, one hitting SMS Grosser Kurfürst, while the other struck SMS Kronprinz; both enemy battleships were considerably damaged. On 7 July 1917, HMS J2, sighted a U-boat and fired a four-torpedo salvo, of which one apparently hit, sinking SM U-99. HMS J6 was sunk in error during 1918 by shelling from the Q-ship Cymric off Blyth.

=== Royal Australian Navy ===
The Australian government had a strong desire to include submarines in its new navy before the outbreak of the war and ordered AE1 and AE2 of the E class. The early loss of both of these boats frustrated the submarine ambitions of the Royal Australian Navy (RAN), seeking a replacement for AE1 as early as October 1914, and setting aside 125,000 pounds in the 1915–1916 estimates for this purpose, however the pressures of wartime meant there was no spare capacity in British yards. In 1916, the manager of Cockatoo Island Dockyard sent a party of ten to study submarine construction in Britain, the party returning in 1918. Further searches for a replacement design were made, but before any progress could be made, the prospect of a gift from the Royal Navy became apparent.

At the end of the war, the Royal Navy looked to consolidate its large wartime construction program by retiring older ships or ships armed with 18-in torpedoes in favour of the units of the L-class patrol and H-class coastal submarines, which were armed with 21-inch (533 mm) torpedoes.

The J class, with their older pattern torpedoes and obsolete tactical concept were surplus to requirements and offered to the Australian government as a part of the gift fleet. Australia had already ordered a submarine depot ship HMAS Platypus before the war. Commander E.C. Boyle, RN, VC was appointed as the flotilla commander and a collection of other RN loan officers, six junior RAN sub-lieutenants and RN and RAN enlisted volunteers, including a "sprinkling" of former AE2 crew members, made up the crews of the six boats.

The six submarines and the depot ship left Britain on 8 April 1919, and sailed via Gibraltar, Malta, Suez, Aden, Columbo, Singapore, Thursday Island and Moreton Bay. They arrived in Sydney on 15 July 1919.

On arrival the need for a program of deep maintenance and battery replacement became urgent, given their arduous wartime service, limited maintenance, and breakdowns experienced on the voyage out. Short term repairs being made to all boats in late 1919, while J3 and J7 entered a deep refit in early 1920 that was to last more than a year, while the other four boats completed a program of peacetime exercises, cruises and port visits from their new base at Geelong, Victoria. Practice returns show that in the last quarter of 1920, the four operational boats made eighty submerged simulated attacks with 39 calculated to have hit. Management issues at Cockatoo Island delayed the refits of J3 and J7 by three months in early 1921. In March 1921, it was calculated that refit costs had reached 73,500 pounds for J3 and 110,861 pounds for J7; the Admiralty had previously advised that the annual operating costs for these boats was 28,300 pounds.

In April 1921, a report to the board gave the status of the six submarines as follows:

- J1 Sydney Battery unsafe and must be replaced (could not dive).
- J2 Sydney Heavy engine and battery defects, to enter refit when J3 completed.
- J3 Sydney Most defects made good, new batteries arrived Cockatoo and unpacked.
- J4 On Service, battery due for replacement December 1921
- J5 On Service, battery due for replacement February 1922
- J7 New battery due in May, defects will be made good by December 1921.

The heavy expenditure on submarines, poor materiel condition of the fleet, and general cutbacks in naval expenditures in the wake of the war made it clear about this time (mid-1921) that the flotilla would have to be reduced to reserve. A plan was drawn up in July by Boyle with three boats remaining in service (J3, J4, and J7) with three laid up in reserve (J1, J2, and J5). This plan was authorised in August, and dredging, wharf construction, and reserve crews were performed at Flinders Naval Depot. The plan was expected to save between 100,000 and 130,000 pounds per year.

In early 1922, the operational boats completed exercises at Geelong and J3 and J4 participated in fleet exercises in Hobart. On 20 March, the dredging at Flinders was complete and J1, J4, and J5 were steamed around from Geelong and laid up. Shortly after, the government informed the RAN that a further 500,000 pound cut to the naval estimates would be made, leaving the Naval Board with no option but to lay up all six boats. There were a number of proposals to run on a cadre force at minimal expense with the J7, the boat in the best condition, but these proposals were not taken up. All of the boats were progressively de-stored and sold off for disposal. Four of the submarines, J1, J2, J4, and J5, were scuttled in Bass Strait, approximately 4 kilometres (2.2 nmi) west-southwest of the entrance to Port Phillip Bay, and are currently popular scuba diving sites. The remaining two submarines were scuttled as breakwaters inside Port Phillip Bay, with J3 located near Swan Island in Queenscliff.

J7 was the last to go; there were more proposals to recommission her for training, and she was routinely used to provide electrical power to the Flinders Naval Depot. The decision to scrap the J7 came on the 16/l/1924 even though it was in fairly good condition after just being refitted. She was described as the last survivor of an obsolete class. She was eventually disposed of in 1929 when she was sold to Morris and Watts Machinery Merchant in October 1929, who after dismantling her sold her to the Ports and Harbors Department Melbourne who sunk her as a breakwater at Sandringham Yacht Club in August 1930.

== Engineering heritage award ==
The submarines received an Engineering Heritage National Marker from Engineers Australia as part of its Engineering Heritage Recognition Program.
