= HMS J7 =

Submarine of the Royal Navy

Coordinates: 37.943381°S 144.99471°E

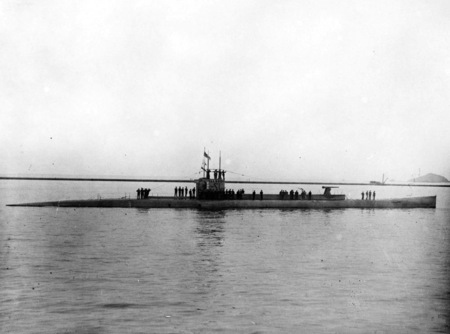
- HMAS J7

History

United Kingdom
- Name: HMS J7
- Builder: HM Dockyard, Devonport
- Launched: 12 February 1917
- Fate: Transferred to Australia, 25 March 1919

Australia
- Name: HMAS J7
- Acquired: 25 March 1919
- Decommissioned: 12 July 1922
- Fate: Sunk 4 June 1926
- Notes: Still extant as breakwater as of 2021

General characteristics
- Class & type: J-class submarine
- Displacement: 1,210 long tons (1,230 t) (surfaced); 1,760 long tons (1,790 t) (submerged)
- Length: 275 ft (84 m)
- Beam: 22 ft (6.7 m)
- Draught: 14 ft (4.3 m)
- Propulsion: Three shafts; Surfaced: three 12-cylinder diesel engines; Submerged: battery-driven electric motors
- Speed: 19 kn (35 km/h; 22 mph) (surfaced); 9.5 kn (17.6 km/h; 10.9 mph) (submerged)
- Range: 4,000 nmi (7,400 km; 4,600 mi) at 12 kn (22 km/h; 14 mph)
- Test depth: 300 ft (91 m) max
- Complement: 44 personnel
- Armament: six 18-inch (450 mm) torpedo tubes; (four bow, two beam); one 4 in (102 mm) gun

HMS J7 (later HMAS J7) was a J-class submarine operated by the Royal Navy and the Royal Australian Navy.

== Design and construction ==
The J class was designed by the Royal Navy in response to reported German submarines with surface speeds over 18 knots (33 km/h; 21 mph). The submarines had a displacement of 1,210 tons surfaced, but J7 had a lighter submerged displacement than her sister boats, at 1,760 tons. Each submarine was 275 feet (84 m) in length overall, with a beam of 22 feet (6.7 m), and a draught of 14 feet (4.3 m). The propulsion system was built around three propeller shafts; the J-class were the only triple-screwed submarines ever built by the British. Propulsion came from three 12-cylinder diesel motors when on the surface, and electric motors when submerged. Top speed was 19 knots (35 km/h; 22 mph) on the surface (the fastest submarines in the world at the time of construction), and 9.5 knots (17.6 km/h; 10.9 mph) underwater. Range was 4,000 nautical miles (7,400 km; 4,600 mi) at 12 knots (22 km/h; 14 mph).

Armament consisted of six 18-inch (450 mm) torpedo tubes (four forward, one on each beam), plus a 4-inch deck gun. Originally, the gun was mounted on a breastwork fitted forward of the conning tower, but the breastwork was later extended to the bow and merged into the hull for streamlining, and the gun was relocated to a platform fitted to the front of the conning tower. The conning tower on J7 was sited 60 feet (18 m) further back than her sister boats, as the control room was located behind the machinery spaces. 44 personnel were aboard.

J7 was built by HM Dockyard Devonport in Plymouth and launched on 12 February 1917.

== Operational history ==
After the war, the British Admiralty decided that the best way to protect the Pacific region was with a force of submarines and cruisers. To this end, they offered the six surviving submarines of the J class to the Royal Australian Navy as gifts. J1 and her sisters were commissioned into the RAN in April 1919, and sailed for Australia on 9 April, in the company of the cruisers Sydney and Brisbane, and the tender Platypus. The flotilla reached Thursday Island on 29 June, and Sydney on 10 July. Because of the submarines' condition after the long voyage, they were immediately taken out of service for refits.

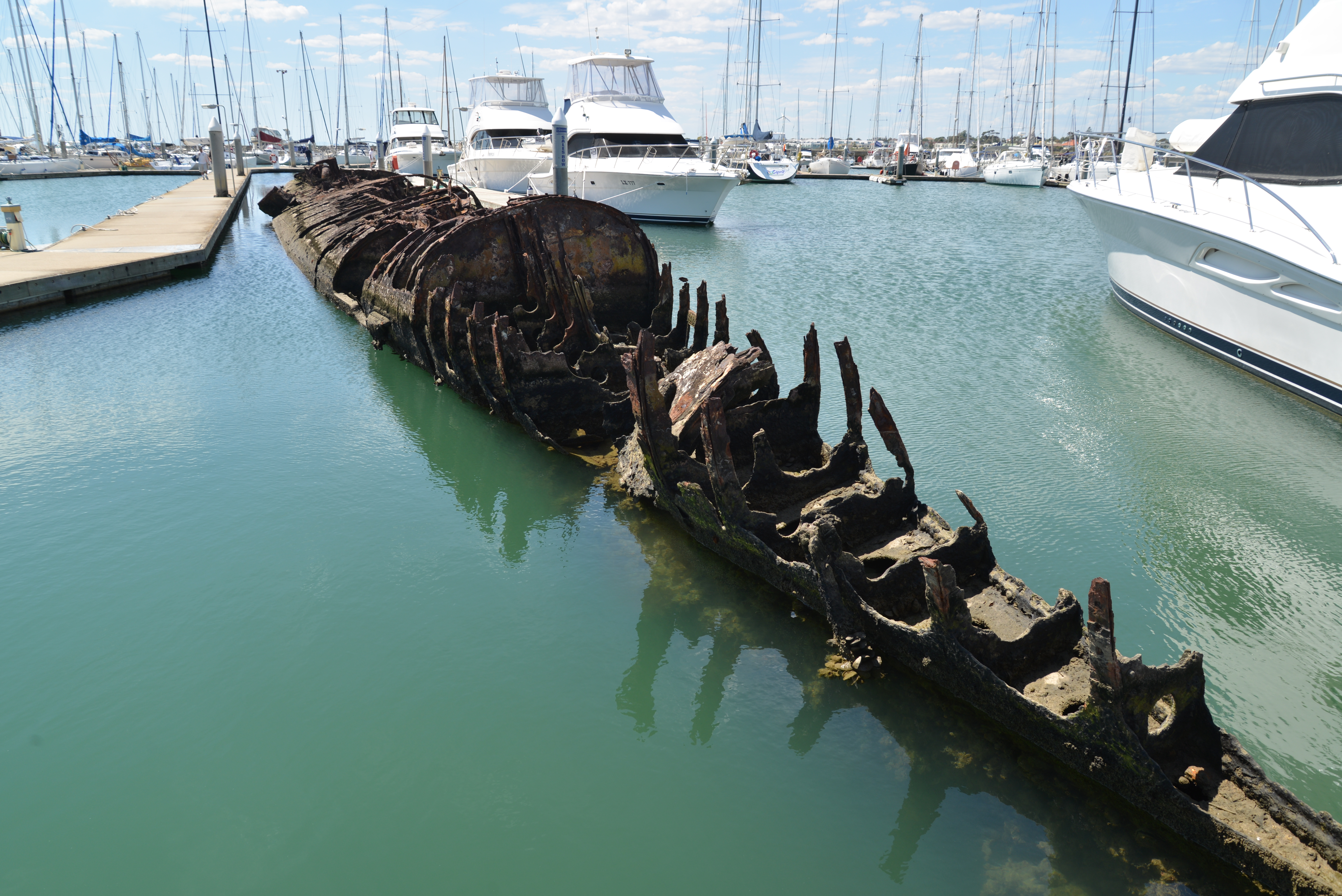
Wreck of HMAS J7 at the Sandringham Yacht Club marina

By the time J7 was returned to service in June 1922, the cost of maintaining the boats and deteriorating economic conditions saw the six submarines decommissioned and marked for disposal.

== Fate ==
J7 was paid off on 12 July 1922, and was sold on 26 February 1924. The hulk was scuttled in 1930, for use as a breakwater at the Sandringham Yacht Club in Port Phillip. Some years later a stone marina was constructed around the wreck, which was left in situ and visible, being too expensive to remove, where it continues to deteriorate.
