= Noel Laurence =

Royal Navy Admiral (1882–1970)

Admiral Sir Noel Laurence KCB DSO*
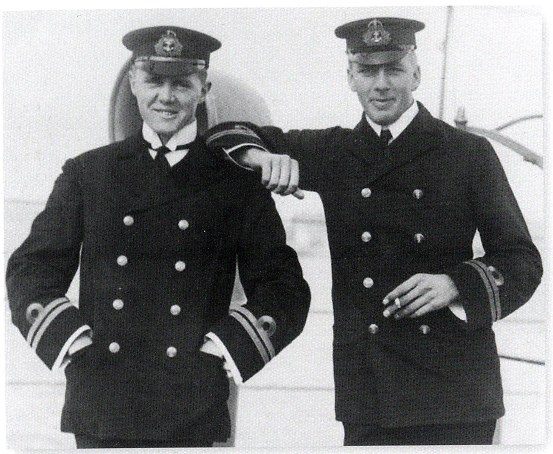
- Noel Laurence (right), commander of E1, with Max Horton (left), commander of E9, in the Baltic
- Born: 27 December 1882; Maidstone, Kent, England
- Died: 26 January 1970 (aged 87); Chertsey, Surrey, England
- Military career
- Allegiance: United Kingdom
- Branch: Royal Navy
- Service years: 1899–1943
- Rank: Admiral
- Commands: HMS E1; HMS J1
- Conflicts: World War I
- Awards: Knight Commander of the Order of the Bath; Distinguished Service Order & Bar

Admiral Sir Noel Frank Laurence KCB DSO* (27 December 1882 – 26 January 1970) was a notable Royal Navy submarine commander during the First World War.

== Early life ==
Laurence was born in 1882 in Kent, the son of Frederic Laurence, JP. He joined the Royal Navy in 1899. By 1904 he was a lieutenant and a submarine specialist.

== Naval service ==
In 1914, he commanded the submarine E1, it operated in the Baltic Sea to attack the German High Seas Fleet. While in the Baltic Laurence worked with the Russians and in 1915 E1 stopped a naval attack on Riga when it sank a German transport and damaged the battlecruiser SMS Moltke. As well as being awarded the Distinguished Service Order for his work in the Baltic the Russians awarded him the Order of St. George (4th Class) and the Order of St Vladimir (4th Class with swords).

Laurence's next command was the submarine J1 which torpedoed two German battleships near Jutland. He was awarded a bar to his Distinguished Service Order for his further operation in submarines in the 1917 New Year Honours, and was made a Chevalier of the Legion of Honour by the French. At the end of the war he was commander of HMS Bonaventure, a submarine depot ship, and its associated submarine flotilla.

Laurence became Commodore of Devonport Naval Barracks in 1930, Rear-Admiral Submarines in 1932 and Vice-Admiral Aircraft Carriers in 1936. He went on to be Admiral Commanding Reserves in 1938 before he moved to Ministry of Aircraft Production as the naval representative; he retired in 1943. He was made Knight Commander of the Order of the Bath (KCB) in the 1938 Birthday Honours.

He was promoted admiral on 1 August 1940.

== Personal life ==
In 1917, Laurence married Esmé Coghlan White. They had two sons and a daughter. He died at St. Peter's Hospital in Chertsey, Surrey, aged 87.

Military offices
Preceded by Charles Little	Rear-Admiral Submarines; 1932–1934	Succeeded by Cecil Talbot
