= Geoffrey Saxton White =

Recipient of the Victoria Cross

Geoffrey Saxton White VC
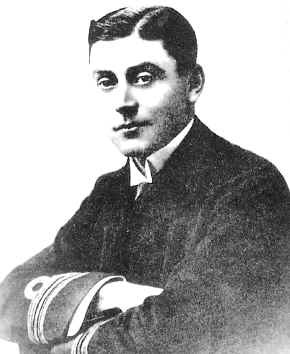
- Born: 2 July 1886; Bromley, Kent
- Died: 28 January 1918 (aged 31); Dardanelles, Ottoman Turkey
- Burial place: Portsmouth Naval Memorial
- Military career
- Allegiance: United Kingdom
- Branch: Royal Navy
- Service years: 1902-1918
- Rank: Lieutenant Commander
- Commands: HMS E14
- Awards: Victoria Cross

Geoffrey Saxton White VC (2 July 1886 – 28 January 1918) was an English Royal Navy officer and recipient of the Victoria Cross, the highest and most prestigious award for gallantry in the face of the enemy that can be awarded to British and Commonwealth forces.

== Early life and career ==
Educated at Bradfield College, he was in September 1902 appointed a naval cadet on the armoured cruiser HMS Aboukir, serving with the Mediterranean Fleet.

He was 31 years old, and a Lieutenant-Commander during the First World War when he won the VC.

=== The VC action ===
On 28 January 1918 in the Dardanelles, Turkey, Lieutenant-Commander White, commanding British submarine E.14 was under instructions to find the German battlecruiser Goeben, which was reported to be aground. She was not found, however, and E.14 turned back. Then came the following sequence of events, for which White was posthumously awarded the VC on 24 May 1919:

Admiralty, S.W., 24th May, 1919.

The KING has been graciously pleased to approve of the posthumous award of the Victoria Cross to the undermentioned Officers : —

Lieutenant-Commander Geoffrey Saxton White, R.N.

For most conspicuous gallantry and devotion to duty as Commanding Officer of H.M. Submarine "E 14" on the 28th of January, 1918.

"E 14" left Mudros on the 27th of January under instructions to force the Narrows and attack the "Goeben" which was reported aground off Nagara Point after being damaged during her sortie from the Dardanelles. The latter vessel was not found and "E 14" turned back. At about 8.45 a.m. on 28 January a torpedo was fired from "E 14" at an enemy ship; 11 seconds after the torpedo left the tube a heavy explosion took place, caused all lights to go out, and sprang the fore hatch. Leaking badly the boat was blown to 15 feet, and at once a heavy fire came from the forts, but the hull was not hit. "E 14" then dived and proceeded on her way out.

Soon afterwards the boat became out of control, and as the air supply was nearly exhausted, Lieutenant-Commander White decided to run the risk of proceeding on the surface. Heavy fire was immediately opened from both sides, and, after running the gauntlet for half-an-hour, being steered from below, "E 14" was so badly damaged that Lieutenant-Commander White turned towards the shore in order to give the crew a chance of being saved. He remained on deck the whole time himself until he was killed by a shell.

White's body was not recovered at the time, and he has no known grave. He is commemorated on the Portsmouth Naval Memorial.
