= Action of 5 November 1916 =

- Part of the First World War
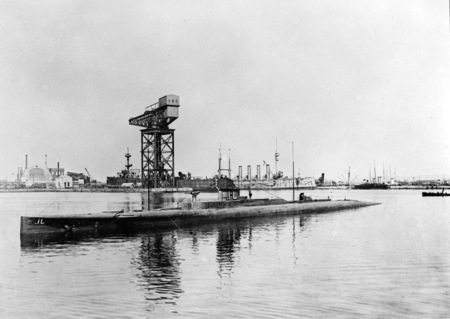
- Submarine J1, circa 1919
Date	5 November 1916
Location	Off Horn Reef, North Sea 55.185962°N 7.457599°E
Result	British victory

Belligerents
United Kingdom	Germany

Commanders and leaders
Noel Laurence	Unknown

Strength
Submarine J1	4 battleships

Casualties and losses
None	Unknown; 2 battleships damaged

The action of 5 November 1916 was a naval engagement of the First World War. The action was fought between a Royal Navy submarine and a dreadnought squadron of the Imperial German Navy. This action took place in the months after the Battle of Jutland and is significant in that it signalled a major shift in German naval policy.

== Background ==
On 2 November 1916, the German U-boat U-30 suffered a mechanical failure while patrolling off the Norwegian coast. She sent a distress signal which was answered by U-20, which was returning from patrol northabout from Ireland. They met and both U-boats started for the Danish coast, where they were to be met off the Bovsberg Light. The British meanwhile had intercepted this wireless traffic, and dispatched a destroyer force to intercept them, but were unsuccessful.

However, on 4 November, both U-boats went aground in evening fog. Concerned that the Danes would intern the two U-boats—or that the British would find them—and mindful of the reputation of U-20 and her skipper as being responsible for the sinking of the ocean liner RMS Lusitania, Admiral Scheer—the commander of the High Seas Fleet—dispatched a salvage group, with a cover force, comprising destroyers of the 4th Half-Flotilla, with the battlecruiser SMS Moltke. These were followed by the four dreadnoughts of 3rd Battle Squadron; SMS König, Grosser Kurfürst, Kronprinz and Markgraf. This move was also detected by the British, who alerted the submarine HMS J1, which was on patrol in the area.

On the evening of 5 November, J1 encountered the Battle squadron and was able to attack.

== Action ==
On 5 November, J1 was submerged on patrol in the North Sea, 30 mi (26 nmi; 48 km) south-west of Horns Reef. Her skipper—Commander NF Laurence—had been alerted to the approach of the German forces, and at 11:50, in heavy seas, he spotted the four dreadnoughts of 3rd Battle Squadron just 2 mi (1.7 nmi; 3.2 km) away. Laurence went deeper to manoeuvre into a firing position, but on rising to periscope depth he saw the dreadnoughts had changed course and were moving away. Surfacing to take advantage of J1's higher surface speed, but risking detection by the Squadrons destroyer escort, Laurence again moved into a firing position and at 12:08 dived to launch a spread of four torpedoes. Two of these hit, striking Grosser Kurfurst astern and Kronprinz on the bow. Both were damaged, but were able to return to base under their own steam. J1 had not been seen by any of the screening destroyers during her approach and they were unable to make an effective counterattack. Laurence remained submerged until 14:30, when he surfaced to an empty sea.

The two damaged dreadnoughts were able to return to base, but both remained in dock under repair for several months. The other forces were able to return without incident. U-30 was also able to return to base, but U-20 as unrecoverable, and was scuttled to avoid capture.

Laurence was awarded a Bar to his Distinguished Service Order for this action.

== Aftermath ==
Following this action, Scheer came under criticism from Pless, the Naval chief of staff, and the Kaiser himself, who felt that risking so many capital ships of the High Seas Fleet, and having two dreadnoughts put out of action, for the sake of two U-boats, was inappropriate. However, Scheer defended himself robustly, stating that it was imperative to give the men of the U-boat arm the fullest possible support. He also stated that Germany's naval strategy should be to concentrate all her efforts on the U-boat offensive, and that henceforth the principal role of the German surface fleet should be to ensure the U-boat force was able to get to sea safely, and to return safely home. It was a striking demonstration of the shift in German naval policy from the pursuit of naval supremacy through her surface fleet, to the war on commerce by her U-boat arm.
