= HMS E14 =

Submarine of the Royal Navy

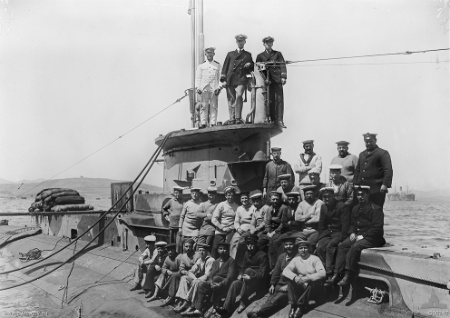
- Crew of E14, seen after leaving the Dardanelles straits in 1915. Lt-Cmdr. Boyle is standing at centre on the conning tower.

History

United Kingdom
- Name: E14
- Builder: Vickers, Barrow
- Cost: £105,700
- Laid down: 14 December 1912
- Launched: 7 July 1914
- Commissioned: 18 November 1914
- Fate: Sunk, 28 January 1918

General characteristics
- Class & type: E-class submarine
- Displacement: 662 long tons (673 t) surfaced; 807 long tons (820 t) submerged
- Length: 181 ft (55 m)
- Beam: 15 ft (4.6 m)
- Propulsion: 2 × 800 hp (597 kW) diesels; 2 × 420 hp (313 kW) electric; 2 screws
- Speed: 15.25 knots (28.24 km/h; 17.55 mph) surfaced; 10.25 knots (18.98 km/h; 11.80 mph) submerged
- Range: 3,000 nmi (5,600 km) at 10 kn (19 km/h; 12 mph); 65 nmi (120 km) at 5 kn (9.3 km/h; 5.8 mph)
- Complement: 30
- Armament: 5 × 18 inch (450 mm) torpedo tubes (2 bow, 2 beam, 1 stern); 1 × 12-pounder gun

HMS E14 was a British E class submarine built by Vickers, Barrow-in-Furness. During the First World War, two of her captains were awarded the Victoria Cross, and many of her officers and men also decorated. HMS E14 was laid down on 14 December 1912 and was commissioned on 18 November 1914. Her hull cost £105,700. She was sunk by shellfire from coastal batteries in the Dardanelles on 28 January 1918.

== Design ==
Like all post-E8 British E-class submarines, E14 had a displacement of 662 long tons (673 t) at the surface and 807 long tons (820 t) while submerged. She had a total length of 180 feet (55 m) and a beam width of 22 feet 8.5 inches (6.922 m). She was powered by two 800 horsepower (600 kW) Vickers eight-cylinder two-stroke diesel engines and two 420 horsepower (310 kW) electric motors. The submarine had a maximum surface speed of 16 knots (30 km/h; 18 mph) and a submerged speed of 10 knots (19 km/h; 12 mph). British E-class submarines had fuel capacities of 50 long tons (51 t) of diesel and ranges of 3,255 miles (5,238 km; 2,829 nmi) when travelling at 10 knots (19 km/h; 12 mph). E14 was capable of operating submerged for five hours when travelling at 5 knots (9.3 km/h; 5.8 mph).

As with most of the early E class boats, E14 was not fitted with a deck gun during construction, but later had a single 6-pounder QF gun mounted forward of the conning tower at Malta dockyard. She had five 18 inch (450 mm) torpedo tubes, two in the bow, one either side amidships, and one in the stern; a total of 10 torpedoes were carried.

E-Class submarines had wireless systems with 1 kilowatt (1.3 hp) power ratings; in some submarines, these were later upgraded to 3 kilowatts (4.0 hp) systems by removing a midship torpedo tube. Their maximum design depth was 100 feet (30 m) although in service some reached depths of below 200 feet (61 m) (other sources say 160ft design depth, 350ft crush depth). Some submarines contained Fessenden oscillator systems. She was crewed by three officers and 28 sailors.

== Service history ==
E14 took part in an operation to penetrate the Sea of Marmara. She successfully dived beneath the minefields and broke into the Sea of Marmara on 27 April 1915. She quickly sank the Turkish gunboat Nurel Bahr, sinking 200 tons on 1 May. She then went on to damage the minelayer Peik I Shevket sinking 1014 tons in a torpedo attack. On 3 May she torpedoed transportship Gul Djemal with 4,000 soldiers on board.

Upon her return, her captain, Lieutenant Commander Edward Courtney Boyle received the Victoria Cross; Lieutenant Edward Geldard Stanley and Acting Lieutenant Reginald Wilfred Lawrence were both awarded the Distinguished Service Cross and all the ratings were awarded the Distinguished Service Medal.

Later in her career, her new captain, Lieutenant Commander Geoffrey Saxton White was posthumously awarded the Victoria Cross for his actions in the Dardanelles. With the ex-Goeben crippled after the Battle of Imbros, E14 was dispatched to finish off the Turkish battlecruiser when repeated air attacks failed to destroy her. She arrived at Nara Burnu at 07:00 on 28 January. Rising to periscope depth, the submarine was unable to find its main target as Goeben had sailed away two days earlier. Turning round, E14 fired two torpedoes at a merchant ship observed through its periscope at 08:45 hours: 11 seconds after the launch of the second torpedo, she was rocked by a premature explosion from that torpedo.

The gunboat Durak Reis and minelayer Nusret were nearby. She attacked the Durak Reis, but the torpedo she fired hit a shipwreck and exploded. E14 was forced to surface due to the effect of the premature explosion and the fire of the Ottoman ships, was badly damaged and dived. The submarine, which hit the seabed at a depth of 150 ft (46 m), tried to exit the Bosphorus underwater, barely controllable. Arriving off Kumkale at around noon, E14 was caught by shore battery fire in front of Kumkale while trying to exit the Bosphorus. Taking direct hits, the submarine eventually sank. White, three officers and 20 enlisted men were killed, while nine surviving crew members were taken prisoner.

== Wreck ==
In June 2012, after a three-year search, Turkish marine engineer Selçuk Kolay and filmmaker Savas Karakas discovered the wreck of E14 in 20 m of water about 250 m off Kum Kale.

The boat is largely buried in sand, only 7 m of the coral-encrusted bow, with a shell hole, remaining visible. The British government is to ask the Turkish authorities to ensure the wreck is respected as a war grave.
