= SM U-99 =

Coordinates: 58°0′N 30°5′E

History

German Empire
- Name: U-99
- Ordered: 15 September 1915
- Builder: AG Weser, Bremen
- Yard number: 250
- Laid down: 30 November 1915
- Launched: 27 January 1917
- Commissioned: 28 March 1917
- Fate: Missing after 7 July 1917

General characteristics
- Class & type: German Type U 57 submarine
- Displacement: 750 t (740 long tons) surfaced; 952 t (937 long tons) submerged
- Length: 67.60 m (221 ft 9 in) (o/a); 54.02 m (177 ft 3 in) (pressure hull)
- Beam: 6.32 m (20 ft 9 in) (o/a); 4.05 m (13 ft 3 in) (pressure hull)
- Height: 8.25 m (27 ft 1 in)
- Draught: 3.65 m (12 ft)
- Installed power: 2 × 2,400 PS (1,765 kW; 2,367 shp) surfaced; 2 × 1,200 PS (883 kW; 1,184 shp) submerged
- Propulsion: 2 shafts, 2 × 1.65 m (5 ft 5 in) propellers
- Speed: 16.5 knots (30.6 km/h; 19.0 mph) surfaced; 8.8 knots (16.3 km/h; 10.1 mph) submerged
- Range: 10,100 nmi (18,700 km; 11,600 mi) at 8 knots (15 km/h; 9.2 mph) surfaced; 45 nmi (83 km; 52 mi) at 5 knots (9.3 km/h; 5.8 mph) submerged
- Test depth: 50 m (160 ft)
- Complement: 4 officers, 32 enlisted
- Armament: 4 × 50 cm (19.7 in) torpedo tubes (two bow, two stern); 10–12 torpedoes; 1 × 8.8 cm (3.5 in) SK L/30 deck gun

Service record
- Part of: II Flotilla; 7 June – 7 July 1917
- Commanders: Kptlt. Max Eltester; 28 March – 7 July 1917
- Operations: 1 patrol
- Victories: None

SM U-99 (Note: "SM" stands for "Seiner Majestät" (English: His Majesty's) and combined with the U for Unterseeboot would be translated as His Majesty's Submarine.) was one of the 329 submarines serving in the Imperial German Navy in World War I.

U-99 was engaged in the naval warfare and took part in the First Battle of the Atlantic.

== Design ==
U-99 had a displacement of 750 tonnes (740 long tons) when at the surface and 952 tonnes (937 long tons) while submerged. She had a total length of 67.60 m (221 ft 9 in), a pressure hull length of 54.02 m (177 ft 3 in), a beam of 6.32 m (20 ft 9 in), a height of 8.25 m (27 ft 1 in), and a draught of 3.65 m (12 ft 0 in). The submarine was powered by two 2,400 metric horsepower (1,800 kW; 2,400 shp) engines for use while surfaced, and two 1,200 metric horsepower (880 kW; 1,200 shp) engines for use while submerged. She had two propeller shafts. She was capable of operating at depths of up to 50 metres (160 ft).

The submarine had a maximum surface speed of 16.5 knots (30.6 km/h; 19.0 mph) and a maximum submerged speed of 8.8 knots (16.3 km/h; 10.1 mph). When submerged, she could operate for 45 nautical miles (83 km; 52 mi) at 5 knots (9.3 km/h; 5.8 mph); when surfaced, she could travel 10,100 nautical miles (18,700 km; 11,600 mi) at 8 knots (15 km/h; 9.2 mph). U-99 was fitted with four 50 centimetres (20 in) torpedo tubes (two at the bow and two at the stern), ten to twelve torpedoes, and one 10.5 cm (4.1 in) SK L/45 deck gun. She had a complement of thirty-six (thirty-two crew members and four officers).

== Fate ==
U-99 sailed on 12 June 1917 with further contact after 13 June; she went missing after 7 July.

=== Previously recorded fate ===
U-99 was thought to have been sunk by British submarine HMS J2, but the attack was conducted at extreme range and is unlikely to have accounted for U-99.

== Bibliography ==
- Gröner, Erich; Jung, Dieter; Maass, Martin (1991). U-boats and Mine Warfare Vessels. German Warships 1815–1945. Vol. 2. Translated by Thomas, Keith; Magowan, Rachel. London: Conway Maritime Press. ISBN 0-85177-593-4.
