= HMS J1 =

J class submarine

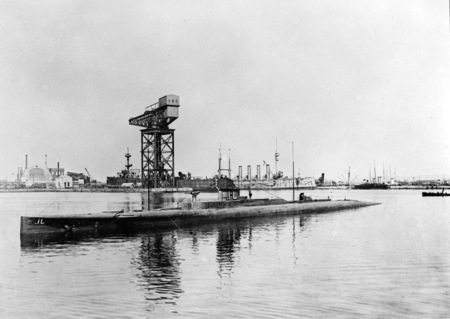
- HMAS J1 in 1919

History

United Kingdom
- Name: HMS J1
- Builder: HM Dockyard at Portsmouth in Hampshire
- Launched: 6 November 1915
- Fate: Transferred to Australia, 25 March 1919

Australia
- Name: HMAS J1
- Acquired: 25 March 1919
- Decommissioned: 12 July 1922
- Fate: Sunk 26 May 1926

General characteristics
- Class & type: British J-class submarine
- Displacement: 1,210 long tons (1,230 t) (surfaced); 1,820 long tons (1,850 t) (submerged)
- Length: 275 ft (84 m)
- Beam: 22 ft (6.7 m)
- Draught: 14 ft (4.3 m)
- Propulsion: Three shafts; Surfaced: three 12-cylinder diesel engines; Submerged: battery-driven electric motors
- Speed: 19 kn (35 km/h; 22 mph) (surfaced); 9.5 kn (17.6 km/h; 10.9 mph) (submerged)
- Range: 4,000 nmi (7,400 km; 4,600 mi) at 12 kn (22 km/h; 14 mph)
- Test depth: 300 ft (91 m) max
- Complement: 44 personnel
- Armament: six 18-inch (450 mm) torpedo tubes; (four bow, two beam); one 4 in (102 mm) gun

HMS J1 (later HMAS J1) was a J-class submarine operated by the Royal Navy and the Royal Australian Navy.

== Design and construction ==
The J class was designed by the Royal Navy in response to reported German submarines with surface speeds over 18 knots (33 km/h; 21 mph). They had a displacement of 1,210 tons surfaced, and 1,820 tons submerged. Each submarine was 275 feet (84 m) in length overall, with a beam of 22 feet (6.7 m), and a draught of 14 feet (4.3 m). The propulsion system was built around three propeller shafts; the J-class were the only triple-screwed submarines ever built by the British. Propulsion came from three 12-cylinder diesel motors when on the surface, and electric motors when submerged. Top speed was 19 knots (35 km/h; 22 mph) on the surface (the fastest submarines in the world at the time of construction), and 9.5 knots (17.6 km/h; 10.9 mph) underwater. Range was 4,000 nautical miles (7,400 km; 4,600 mi) at 12 knots (22 km/h; 14 mph).

Armament consisted of six 18-inch (450 mm) torpedo tubes (four forward, one on each beam), plus a 4-inch deck gun. Originally, the gun was mounted on a breastwork fitted forward of the conning tower, but the breastwork was later extended to the bow and merged into the hull for streamlining, and the gun was relocated to a platform fitted to the front of the conning tower. 44 personnel were aboard.

J1 was built by HM Dockyard at Portsmouth in Hampshire, and launched on 6 November 1915.

== Service history ==
J1 operated in patrols in the North Sea. In November 1916, a German force of half a destroyer flotilla, three dreadnoughts, and a battlecruiser set out from port to rescue two submarines U-20 and U-30 that were stranded in fog off Jutland. On the return, having only rescued one of the submarines, the force passed J1 off Horns Reef on 5 November 1916. Two of the dreadnoughts, SMS Kronprinz and SMS Grosser Kurfürst, were torpedoed by J1, earning her commanding officer, Commander N. F. Laurence, a Bar for his Distinguished Service Order. The dreadnoughts did not sink, but reached port and underwent repairs.

The submarine was later transferred to Gibraltar for operations in the Mediterranean. On 9 November 1918, during an engagement with UB-57, J1 launched a depth charge from a specially fitted launcher.

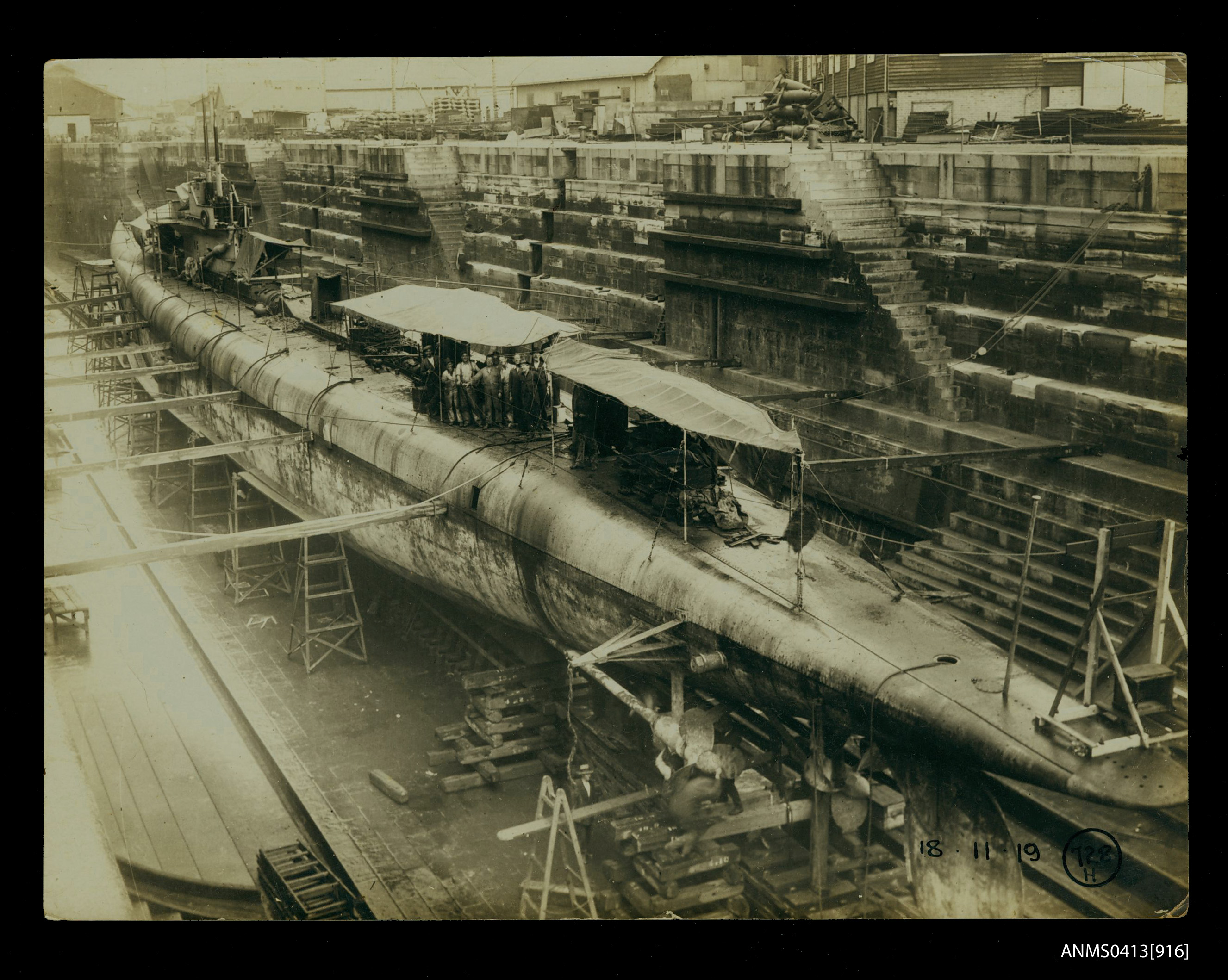
J1 being refitted at Cockatoo Island Dockyard in 1919

After the war, the British Admiralty decided that the best way to protect the Pacific region was with a force of submarines and cruisers. To this end, they offered the six surviving submarines of the J class to the Royal Australian Navy as gifts. J1 and her sisters were commissioned into the RAN in April 1919, and sailed for Australia on 9 April, in the company of the cruisers Sydney and Brisbane, and the tender Platypus. The flotilla reached Thursday Island on 29 June, and Sydney on 10 July. Because of the submarines' condition after the long voyage, they were immediately taken out of service for refits.

J1 and J4, plus Platypus, sailed on 10 February 1920 for Geelong, where a submarine base was established. Apart from local exercises and a 1921 visit to Tasmania, the submarines saw little use, and by June 1922, the cost of maintaining the boats and deteriorating economic conditions saw the six submarines decommissioned and marked for disposal.

== Fate ==
The submarine was paid off on 12 July 1922. J1 was sold to the Melbourne Salvage Company on 26 February 1924. The hulk was scuttled in the ship graveyard off Port Phillip Heads at 38°18′58″S 144°33′13″E on 26 May 1926. The J1 wreck, also known as "38 Metre Sub", "135 Foot Sub", or "New Sub", is submerged in 38 metres (125 ft) of water, and is accessible by experienced divers.
