= HMAS Brisbane (1915) =

Town-class light cruiser

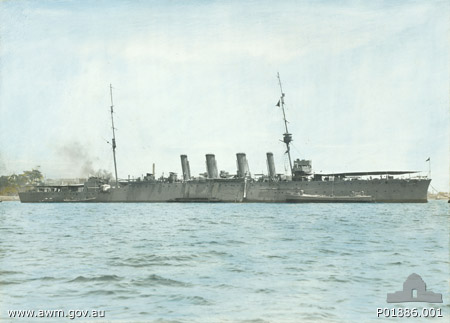
- HMAS Brisbane shortly after completion in 1916

History

Australia
- Name: Brisbane
- Namesake: City of Brisbane
- Builder: Cockatoo Island Dockyard, Sydney
- Laid down: 25 January 1913
- Launched: 30 September 1915
- Commissioned: 31 October 1916
- Completed: 12 December 1916
- Decommissioned: 24 September 1935
- Motto: Conjunctis Viribus; Latin: "With United Strength"
- Honours and awards: Battle honours: Indian Ocean 1917
- Fate: Sold for scrap, 1936

General characteristics
- Class & type: Town class light cruiser (Chatham subtype)
- Displacement: 5,400 long tons (5,500 t) (standard)
- Length: 456 ft 8 3/8 in (139.202 m)
- Beam: 49 ft 10 in (15.19 m)
- Draught: 19 ft 11 in (6.07 m) (maximum)
- Installed power: 12 Yarrow boilers; 25,000 shp (19,000 kW)
- Propulsion: 4 screws; steam turbines
- Speed: 25 knots (46 km/h; 29 mph) (design); 25.6 knots (47.4 km/h; 29.5 mph) (speed trials)
- Range: 4,000 nmi (7,400 km; 4,600 mi) at 11.5 knots (21.3 km/h; 13.2 mph)
- Complement: 31 officers, 454 ratings
- Armament: 8 × 6 in (152 mm) guns; 1 × 3 in (76 mm) anti-aircraft gun; 4 × 3 pdr (47 mm, 1.9 in) guns; 2 × submerged 18-inch (450-mm) torpedo tubes

HMAS Brisbane was a Town class light cruiser of the Royal Australian Navy (RAN). Built in Sydney between 1913 and 1916 to the Chatham subtype design, Brisbane operated in the Indian Ocean, Pacific Ocean, and Australian coastal waters during World War I.

Following the end of the war, the cruiser was decommissioned and recommissioned on several occasions, and was reclassified as a training ship in late 1925. In 1935, Brisbane was reactivated to transport personnel to Britain for training on the new cruiser HMAS Sydney, after which she was decommissioned and sold for breaking up as scrap.

== Design and construction ==
Brisbane was built by Cockatoo Island Dockyard to the Chatham subtype of the Town class cruiser design. Laid down on 25 January 1913, the cruiser was launched on 30 September 1915 by the wife of Andrew Fisher; Prime Minister of Australia on three occasions. Brisbane was commissioned into the RAN on 31 October 1916, although she was not completed until 12 December. The ship cost A£746,624 to build; unlike her Australian sister ships, the cost of adding armour was included in the original estimate.

She was 456 feet 8 3/8 inches (139.202 m) long overall, with a beam of 49 feet 10 inches (15.19 m) and a maximum draught of 19 feet 11 inches (6.07 m). The cruiser had a standard displacement of 5,400 tons. Brisbane was propelled by Parsons steam turbines, which provided 25,000 shaft horsepower (19,000 kW) to four propellers. Although designed with a maximum speed of 25 knots (46 km/h), Brisbane once reached 25.67 knots (47.54 km/h) during full speed trials. Her standard cruising speed was 11.5 knots (21.3 km/h), which could be maintained for 4,000 nautical miles (7,400 km). The ship was fuelled by a combination of coal (1,196 tons at full load) and oil (260 tons). Her ship's company consisted of 31 officers and 454 sailors.

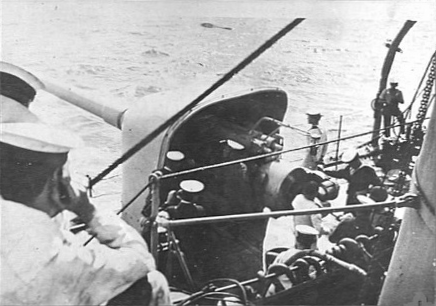
6-inch gun practice on Brisbane during World War I

The cruiser's primary armament consisted of eight BL 6-inch (152.4 mm) Mk XI* guns, arranged in single mountings behind open-backed gunshields. A single quick-firing 3-inch (76 mm) gun was used to protect the ship from air attack. Brisbane carried a 12-pounder field gun for ashore deployment. Four 3-pounder (47-mm, 1.9-in) quick-firing Hotchkiss guns were used as saluting guns. Ten .303-inch machine guns were carried for close defence work (eight Lewis guns and two Maxim guns). Two submerged 18-inch (450-mm) torpedo tubes were fitted: one on each side, firing broadside. Armour plating consisted of side belts 3-inch (76 mm) thick amidships, tapering to 1.5-inch (38 mm) thick at the bow and stern, along with protective decking over the engineering and magazine spaces, and an armoured conning tower.

== Operational history ==
On 13 December 1916, Brisbane departed on a voyage to the Mediterranean. After reaching Malta on 4 February, the ship was fitted with equipment not available in Australia at the time. Soon after, the ship was redeployed to Colombo, and employed on Indian Ocean patrols to search for the German raiders Wolf and Seeadler.

In February 1917, a Sopwith Baby seaplane was acquired from HMS Raven II for reconnaissance work; the first aircraft to be used by a RAN ship. This remained aboard until June, when Brisbane was sent back to Australia with orders to patrol the Western Australian coast. From October 1917, the cruiser was assigned to operations in the western Pacific in response to reports of German raider activity. Initially deployed to the Solomon Islands, Brisbane visited Nauru, the Gilbert Islands, and Fiji, before returning to duties in Australian waters in January 1918.

On 21 October 1918, Brisbane departed for the eastern Mediterranean, and was between Colombo and Suez when World War I ended. The battle honour "Indian Ocean 1917" recognises the cruiser's wartime service. The ship reached Moudros in late November, and spent most of December operating with the Australian Destroyer Squadron, before visiting Smyrna and the Dardanelles.

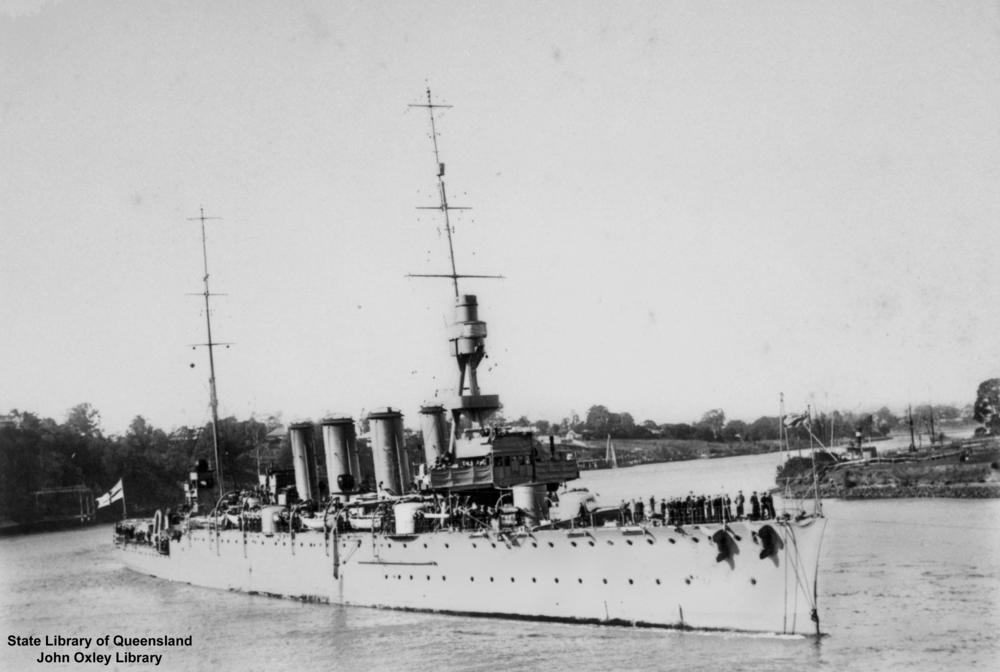
HMAS Brisbane in 1919

Brisbane reached the United Kingdom before the end of December 1918, and began refitting at Portsmouth. The most visible aspect of the refit was the installation of a tripod mast. The cruiser remained in British waters until 17 April 1919, when she departed from Portsmouth for home. During the return trip, she caught up with the submarine depot ship HMAS Platypus and the six J class submarines transferred from the Royal Navy to the RAN after the war, and relieved HMAS Sydney as their escort. J5 was experiencing problems, and Brisbane took the boat under tow: the two vessels reached Sydney on 27 June. The cruiser operated in Australian waters until 4 August 1922, when she was decommissioned into reserve.

Brisbane was reactivated on 14 April 1923. On 23 July 1924, she ran aground off Port Moresby, New Guinea; she was refloated later that day. From February until August 1925, the ship served with the Royal Navy's China Squadron as part of an exchange, with HMS Concord sent to Australia. While deployed with the China Squadron, Brisbane became the first RAN ship to visit Japan. The cruiser was placed back in reserve on 7 October, underwent a refit, and recommissioned on 17 November as a training ship attached to Flinders Naval Depot. A longer period of decommissioning and refit ran from 30 October 1926 until 28 June 1928, when she resumed training duties. In August 1928, Brisbane visited Hawaii, and was present for celebrations commemorating the 150th anniversary of the islands' discovery. The cruiser was again decommissioned, on 16 August 1929.

Brisbane was commissioned for the final time on 2 April 1935, for the specific purpose of conveying the ship's company of the new cruiser HMAS Sydney to their ship in Britain. During the voyage, the cruiser assisted the British sloop HMS Hastings. Brisbane reached Portsmouth on 12 July 1935, and was decommissioned on 24 September. She was the last coal-fuelled cruiser operational in any British Empire navy. On 13 June 1936, Brisbane was sold to Thos. W. Ward for A£19,215 to be broken up. The cruiser was scrapped at Briton Ferry, Wales by the end of 1936.
