= HMAS Platypus (1917) =

Submarine depot ship and base ship operated by the Royal Australian Navy

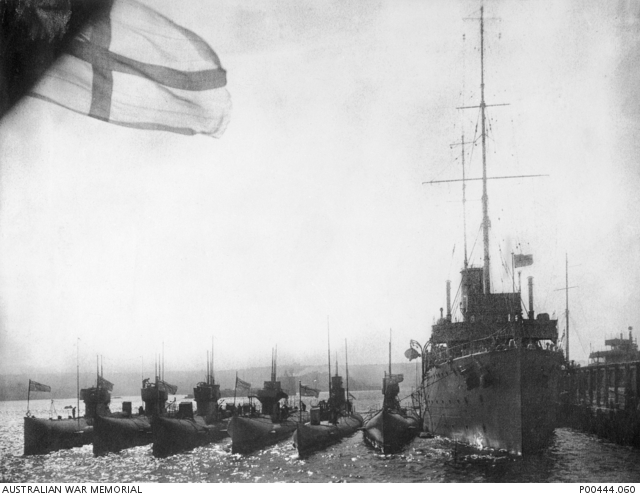
- HMAS Platypus with all six Australian J-class submarines in 1919

History

United Kingdom
- Builder: John Brown and Company, Clydebank, Scotland
- Laid down: 14 October 1914
- Launched: 28 October 1916
- Commissioned: 21 March 1917
- Decommissioned: 1919
- Fate: Transferred to Royal Australian Navy

Australia
- Commissioned: 25 March 1919
- Decommissioned: 13 May 1946 (into reserve); 1 November 1956 (paid off for disposal)
- Renamed: HMAS Penguin (1929); HMAS Platypus (1941)
- Reclassified: Destroyer tender 1922–1929; Submarine tender 1929–1930; Depot ship 1930–1941; Base ship/training ship 1941–1944; Maintenance ship 1944–1946
- Stricken: 20 February 1958
- Motto: "Nothing Too Difficult"
- Honours and awards: Battle honours: Darwin 1942–43
- Fate: Sold for scrap in 1958

General characteristics
- Displacement: 3,476 tons
- Length: 310 ft (94 m) (water line); 325 ft (99 m) (overall)
- Beam: 44 ft (13 m)
- Draught: 15 ft 8 in (4.78 m)
- Propulsion: 2 sets of triple expansion reciprocating steam engines, twin screw
- Speed: 15.5 knots (28.7 km/h; 17.8 mph)
- Armament: 1 × 4.7-inch gun

HMAS Platypus was a submarine depot ship and base ship operated by the Royal Australian Navy (RAN) between 1919 and 1946. Ordered prior to World War I to support the Australian submarines AE1 and AE2, Platypus was not completed until after both submarines had been lost, and she was commissioned into the Royal Navy from 1917 to 1919.

After the RAN acquired six J-class submarines, Platypus was recommissioned as an Australian warship. She was repurposed as a destroyer tender after the J class was removed from service in the 1920s, tasked with supporting the two O-class submarines during 1929 and 1930. After the submarines were placed in reserve, Platypus was renamed HMAS Penguin and operated as a depot ship until 1941. The ship assumed her old name and was relocated to Darwin, then Cairns for use as a base ship. After a refit in 1944, Platypus operated as a repair vessel in New Guinea waters until she was placed into reserve in 1946. Platypus was sold for scrap in 1958.

== Construction and acquisition ==
Platypus was ordered as a submarine tender by the Australian government before the outbreak of the war to service the new E-class submarines, AE1 and AE2. She was built by John Brown and Company at Clydebank in Scotland, and launched on 28 October 1916. By the time she was completed, both submarines had been lost, and she was instead commissioned into the Royal Navy on 21 March 1917.

== Operational history ==
=== Royal Navy ===
At the conclusion of the war, the ship was transferred to the Royal Australian Navy and was commissioned into the RAN on 25 March 1919.

=== Royal Australian Navy ===
Platypus's main role was to support the RAN's six J-class submarines, which she sailed with from Britain to Sydney between April and July 1919.

Platypus and all six J-class submarines were based at Geelong in February 1920. Due to the poor condition of the submarines and financial pressure on the RAN the Royal Australian Navy Submarine Service was disbanded in May 1922 and Platypus was redesignated as a destroyer tender. Platypus reverted to her original role as a submarine tender in 1929 when the RAN acquired two O-class submarines but was used as a depot ship after these submarines were placed into reserve in 1930. She was renamed HMAS Penguin on 15 August 1930.

In October 1932, a mutiny occurred aboard Penguin. The mutiny was in protest of the decreases in sailor pay and conditions: Depression-era cutbacks had impacted them harder than officers, as they had no avenues of protest. The ship's commanding officer was sympathetic, promising that he would forward their concerns to the Australian Commonwealth Naval Board (which refused to consider them) and that they would not be punished.

She continued as a depot ship until 26 February 1941 when she was renamed HMAS Platypus and returned to seagoing service as a training ship. In May 1941, Platypus sailed to Darwin to serve as a base ship. She survived the Japanese attack on Darwin in February 1942 and remained at Darwin until January 1943 when she sailed to Cairns, Queensland where she again served as a base ship until May 1944. In June 1944 Platypus received a major refit and sailed to New Guinea as a repair and maintenance vessel. She operated off New Guinea and Morotai Island until returning to Australia in December 1945. The wartime service of Platypus was later recognised with the battle honour "Darwin 1942–43".

== Decommissioning and fate ==
Platypus was placed into reserve on 13 May 1946, paid off on 1 November 1956 and was sold for scrap on 20 February 1958.
