= List of submarines of the Royal Navy =

This is a list of Royal Navy submarines, arranged chronologically, that is, individual submarines are grouped according to their class and the classes are ordered chronologically according to when the first submarine of the class entered British service (for the first time); furthermore, the classes are grouped into historical eras, again chronologically according to when the first vessel of the class entered British service (for the first time). Within the class the individual submarines are chronologically ordered according to date of enter into British service (for the first time).

Submarines that are currently active and commissioned are shown below in bold.

== Pre–First World War ==
HMS Holland 1, the first submarine to serve in the Royal Navy

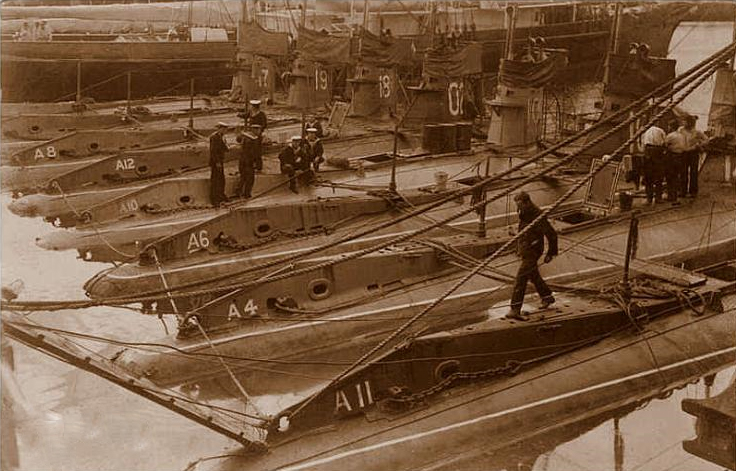
A-class submarines, the first British-designed class

Until 27 July 1914

- Holland class
  - Holland 1, launched: 2 October 1901, decommissioned: 5 November 1913
  - Holland 2
  - Holland 3
  - Holland 4
  - Holland 5
- A class
  - A1, launched: 9 July 1902
  - A2
  - A3
  - A4
  - A5
  - A6
  - A7
  - A8
  - A9
  - A10
  - A11
  - A12
  - A13
- B class
  - 11 boats, 1904–1906
  - B1
  - B2
  - B3
  - B4
  - B5
  - B6
  - B7
  - B8
  - B9
  - B10
  - B11
- C class
  - 38 boats, 1906–1910

== First World War ==
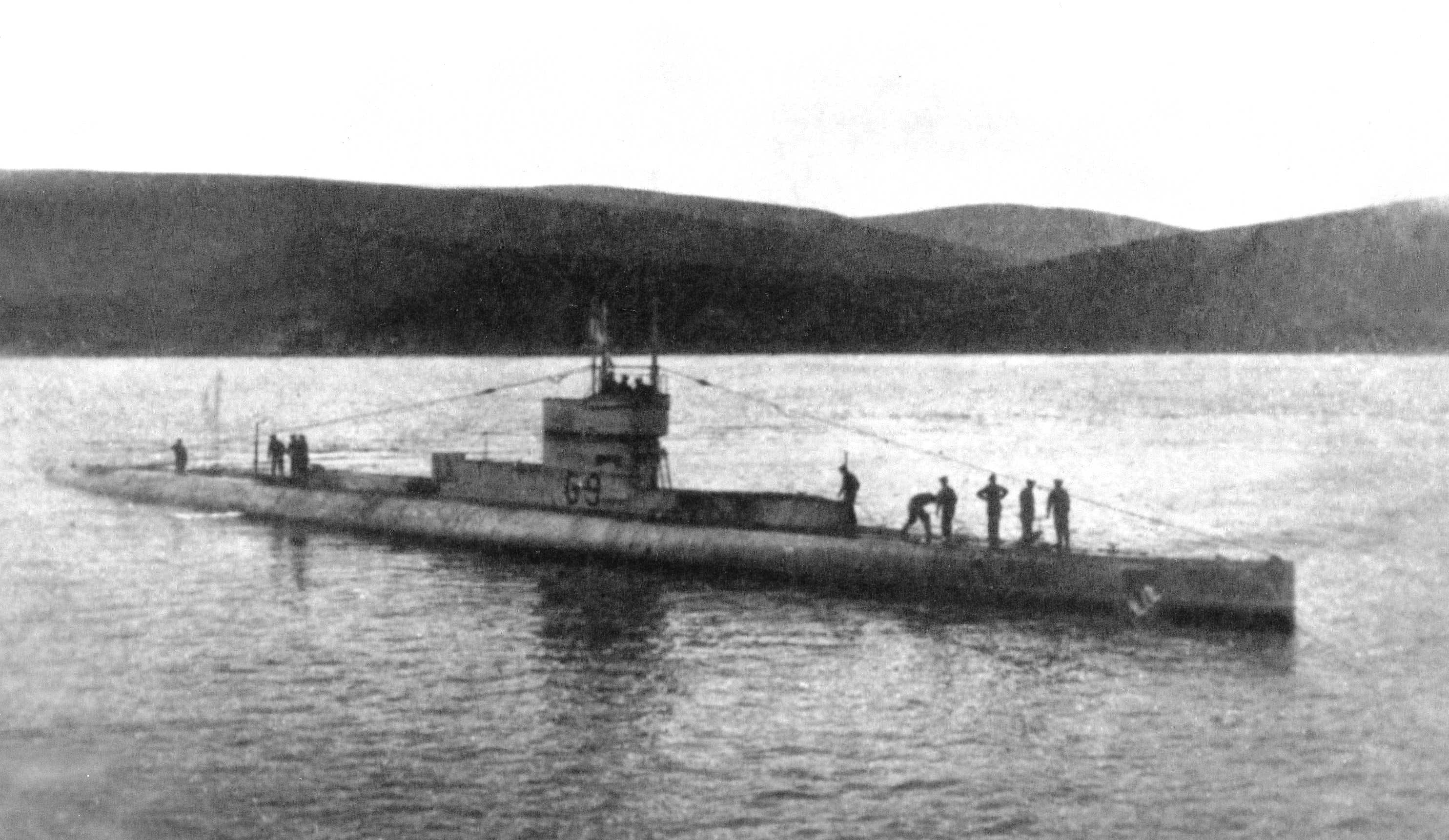
HMS G9 at Scapa Flow in 1917

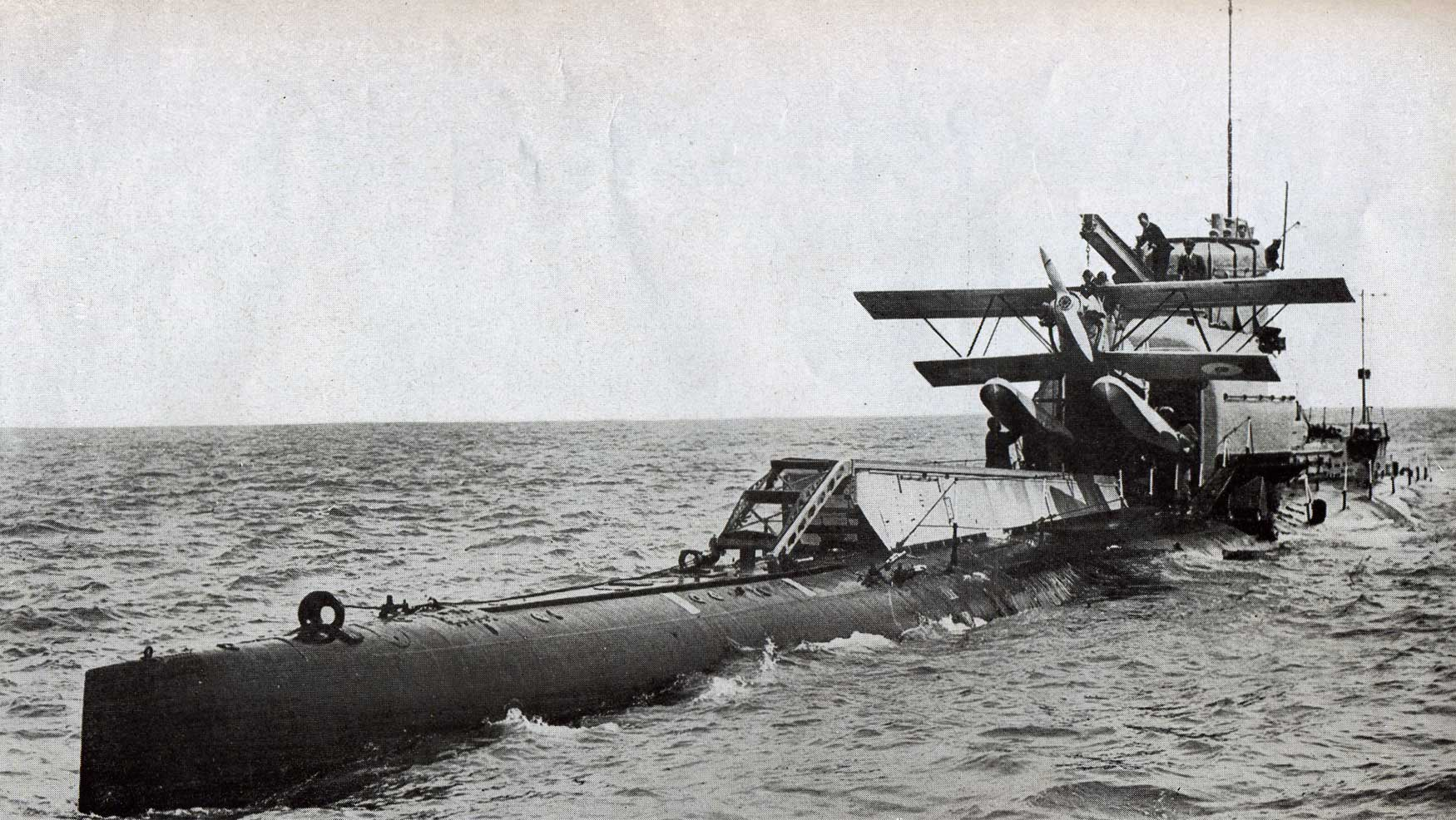
HMS M2 with her sea plane

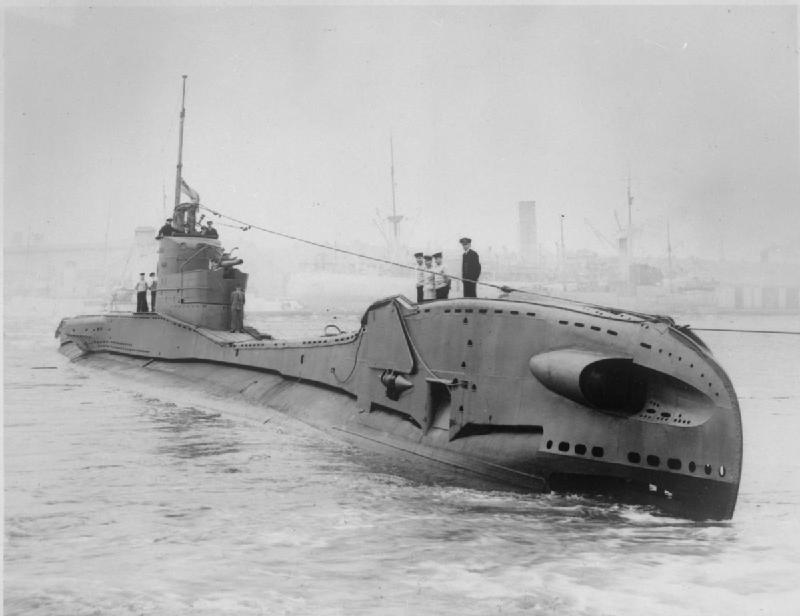
HMS Thorn

28 July 1914 - 11 November 1918

- D class
- E class
- F class
- S class
- V class
- W class
- G class
- H class
- Nautilus class
- Swordfish class
- J class
- K class
  - HMS K1
  - HMS K2
  - HMS K3
  - HMS K4
  - HMS K5
  - HMS K6
  - HMS K7
  - HMS K8
  - HMS K9
  - HMS K10
  - HMS K11
  - HMS K12
  - HMS K13
  - HMS K14
  - HMS K15
  - HMS K16
  - HMS K17
  - HMS K26
- L class
- M class
  - HMS M1
  - HMS M2
  - HMS M3
  - HMS M4
- R class

== Interwar years ==
12 November 1918 - 31 August 1939 (for the purpose of this list, interwar period is understood to have started immediately after WW1 and lasted until WW2)

- HMS X1
- Odin class
- Parthian class
  - HMS Pandora (N42)
  - HMS Parthian (N75)
  - HMS Perseus (N36)
  - HMS Phoenix (N96)
  - HMS Poseidon (P99)
  - HMS Proteus (N29)
- Rainbow class
- S (Swordfish) class
- River or Thames class
  - HMS Thames (N71)
  - HMS Severn (N57)
  - HMS Clyde (N12)
- Grampus class
- T (Triton) class
- U (Undine) class

== Second World War ==
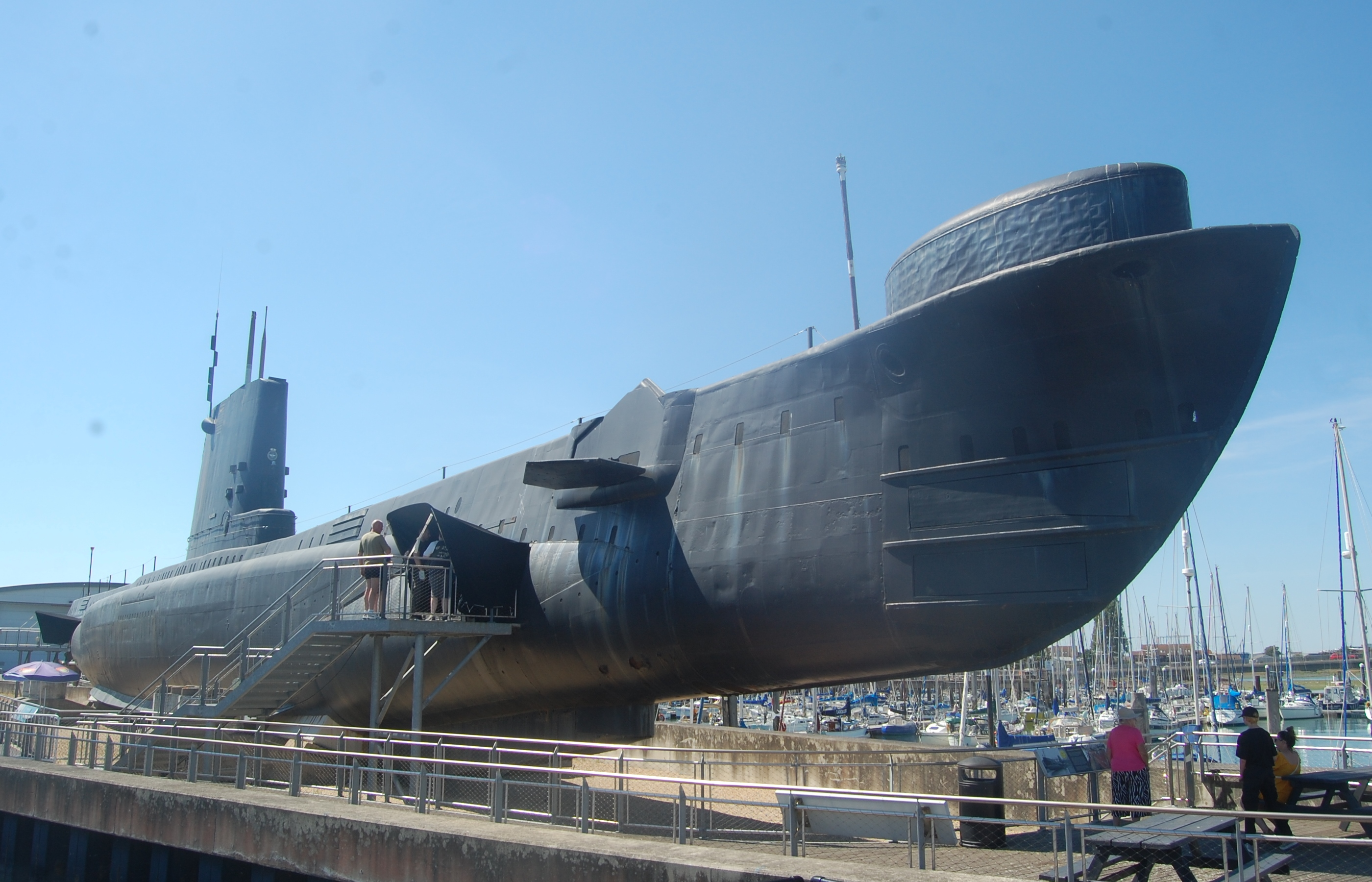
HMS Alliance at Gosport (where she is now part of the submarine museum) in 2022

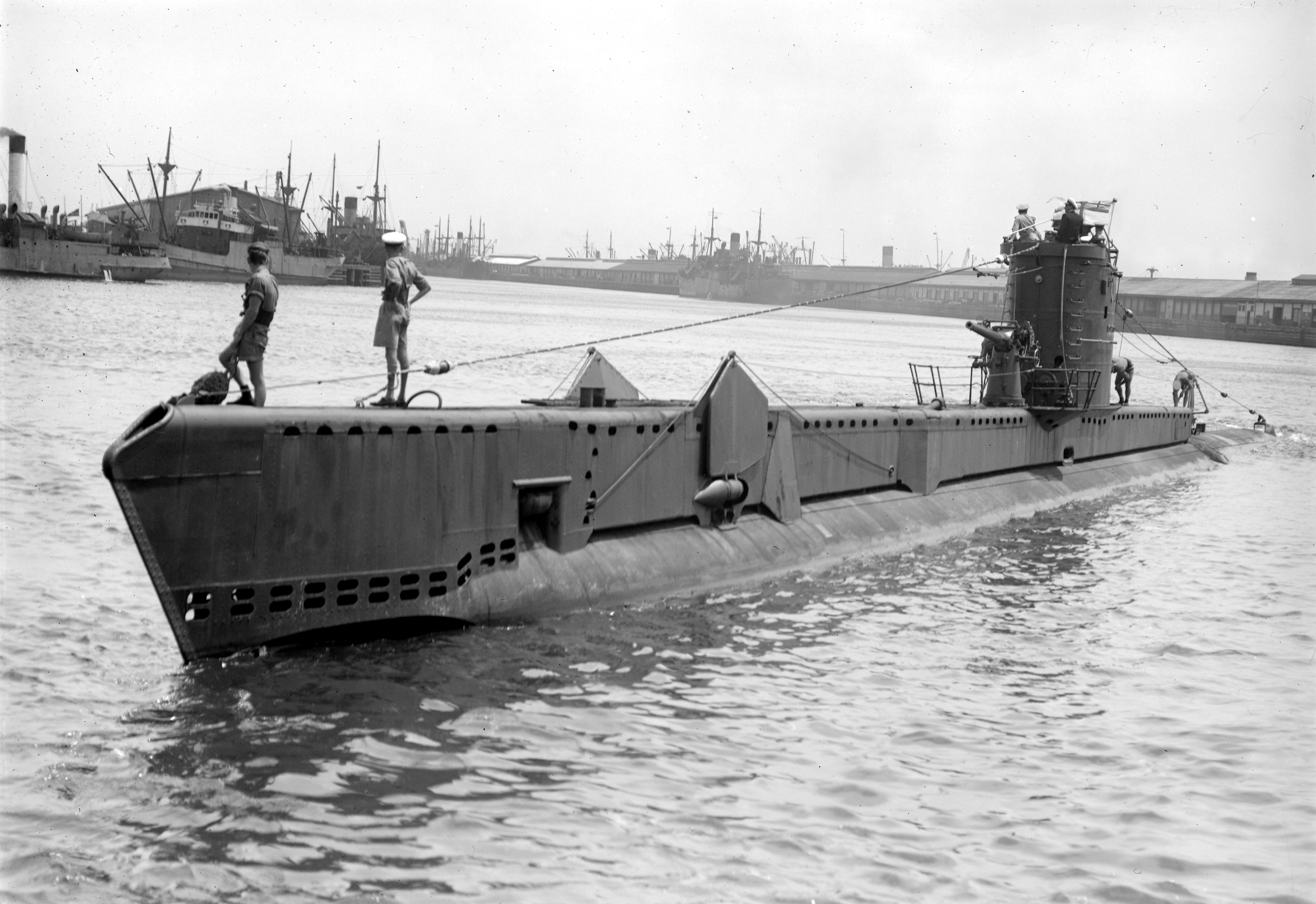
HMS Voracious in 1945

1 September 1939 - 2 September 1945

- U (Uproar) class; first vessel commissioned 2 April 1941
- U (Umpire) class (War Emergency Programme); first vessel commissioned 10 July 1941
- Foreign Built; first vessel commissioned 5 October 1941
  - Graph (P715) – German Type VII U-boat
  - N2 – German Type VII-C/41 U-boat
  - X2 – Italian, Archimede-class submarine
- United States R-class submarine; first vessel commissioned 4 November 1941
  - HMS P511
  - HMS P512
  - HMS P514
- P611 class; first vessel commissioned 1 December 1941
  - HMS P611
  - HMS P612
  - HMS P614
  - HMS P615
- T (Tempest) class (War Emergency Programme); first vessel commissioned 6 December 1941
- S (Safari) class (War Emergency Programme); first vessel commissioned 14 March 1942
- V (Vampire) class; first vessel commissioned 19 August 1943
- Amphion class; first vessel commissioned 27 March 1945
  - Amphion (P439/S39/S43) (laid down as Anchorite but name changed before launch)
  - Astute (P447/S47/S45)
  - Auriga (P419/S19/S69)
  - Aurochs (P426/S26/S62)
  - Alcide (P415/S15/S65)
  - Alderney (P416/S16/S66)
  - Alliance (P417/S17/S67)
  - Ambush (P418/S18/S68)
  - Anchorite (P422/S22/S64)
  - Andrew (P423/S23/S63)
  - Affray (P421)
  - Aeneas (P427/S27/S72/SSG72)
  - Alaric (P441/S41)
  - Artemis (P449/S39/S49)
  - Artful (P456/S56/S96)
  - Acheron (P411/S11/S61)
  - Ace (P414)
  - Achates (P433)

== Cold War ==
3 September 1945 - 26 December 1991 (for the purpose of this list, Cold War is understood to begin immediately after WW2)

=== To mid-1950s ===
3 September 1945 – 31 December 1956

- Foreign Built
  - Meteorite, commissioned/decommissioned: 1945–1949 – German Type XVII U-boat
- Stickleback class (midget submarines)
  - X51 Stickleback, commissioned/decommissioned: 1954–1958
  - X52 Shrimp, c/d: 1954–1965
  - X53 Sprat, c/d: 1954–1958/1966
  - X54 Minnow, c/d: 1955–1966
- Explorer class
  - HMS Explorer, commissioned/decommissioned: 1956–1965
  - HMS Excalibur, c/d: 1958–1968

=== Late 1950s to early 1990s ===
1 January 1957 - 26 December 1991

From HMS Porpoise Royal Navy submarines were given their own "S" pennant numbers.

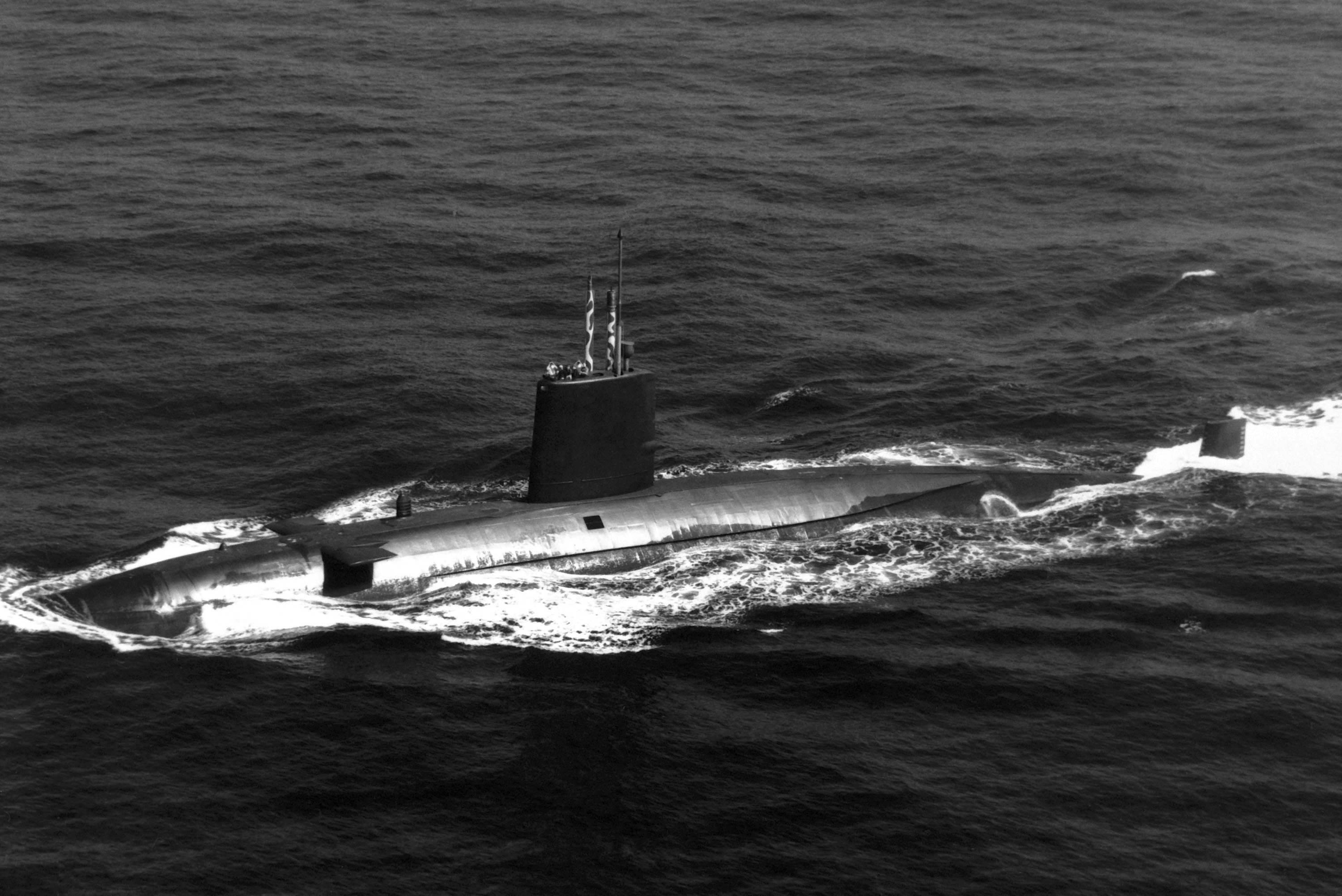
A Valiant-class nuclear submarine. Whilst HMS Dreadnought had an American reactor, these were fully British-built

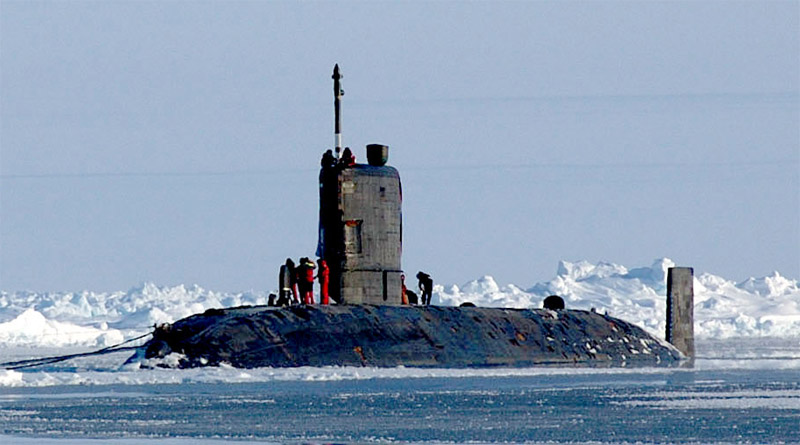
HMS Tireless at the North Pole

- Porpoise class (Diesel-electric hunter-killer)
  - Porpoise, commissioned/decommissioned: 1958–1982
  - Narwhal, c/d: 1959–1977
  - Finwhale, c/d: 1960–1987 (harbour service from 1979)
  - Cachalot, c/d: 1959–1979
  - Sealion, c/d: 1961–1987
  - Walrus, c/d: 1961–1986
  - Grampus, c/d: 1958–1978
  - Rorqual, c/d: 1958–1976
- Oberon class (Diesel-electric hunter-killer)
  - Oberon, commissioned/decommissioned: 1961–1986
  - Onslaught, c/d: 1962–1990
  - Orpheus, c/d: 1960–1990 (harbour service from 1987)
  - Odin, c/d: 1962–1990
  - Otter, c/d: 1962–1991
  - Olympus, c/d: 1961–1989
  - Oracle, c/d: 1963–1993
  - Ocelot, c/d: 1964–1991
  - Otus, c/d: 1963–1991
  - Opossum, c/d: 1964–1993
  - Opportune, c/d: 1964–1993
  - Osiris, c/d: 1964–1989
  - Onyx, c/d: 1967–1991
- Dreadnought (Nuclear-powered hunter-killer), commissioned/decommissioned: 1963–1980
- Valiant class (PWR1 nuclear-powered hunter-killer)
  - Valiant, commissioned/decommissioned: 1966–1994
  - Warspite, c/d: 1967–1991
- Resolution class (PWR1 nuclear-powered ballistic missile)
  - Resolution, commissioned/decommissioned: 1967–1994
  - Repulse, c/d: 1967–1996
  - Renown, c/d: 1967–1996
  - Revenge, c/d: 1969–1992
- Churchill class (PWR1 nuclear-powered hunter-killer)
  - Churchill, commissioned/decommissioned: 1970–1991
  - Conqueror, c/d: 1971–1990
  - Courageous, c/d: 1971–1992
- Swiftsure class (PWR1 nuclear-powered hunter-killer)
  - Swiftsure, commissioned/decommissioned: 1973–1992
  - Sovereign, c/d: 1974–2006
  - Superb, c/d: 1976–2008
  - Sceptre, c/d: 1978–2010
  - Spartan, c/d: 1979–2006
  - Splendid, c/d: 1981–2004
- Trafalgar class (PWR1 nuclear-powered hunter-killer)
  - Trafalgar, commissioned/decommissioned: 1983–2009
  - Turbulent, c/d: 1984–2012
  - Tireless, c/d: 1985–2014
  - Torbay, c/d: 1987–2017
  - Trenchant, c/d: 1989–2022
  - Talent, c/d: 1990–2022
  - Triumph, c/d: 1991–2025
- Upholder class (Diesel-electric hunter-killer) Transferred to Canada as the Victoria-class submarine
  - Upholder, commissioned/decommissioned: 1990–1994
  - Unseen, c/d: 1991–1994
  - Ursula, c/d: 1992–1994
  - Unicorn, c/d: 1993–1994

== After Cold War to present ==
27 December 1991 - Present

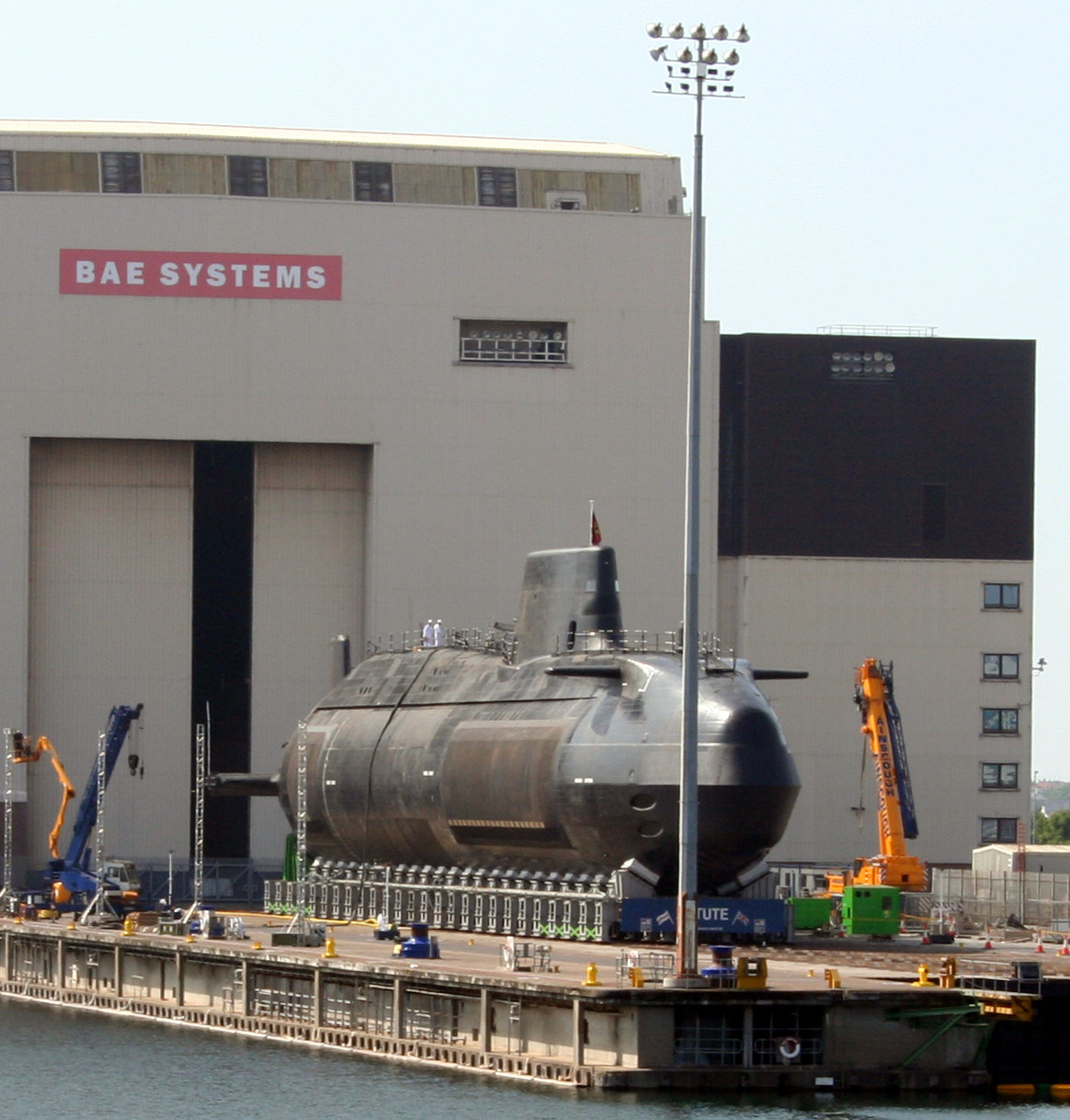
HMS Astute being launched

- Vanguard class (PWR2 nuclear-powered ballistic missile)
  - **Vanguard**, commissioned: 1993
  - **Victorious**, commissioned: 1995
  - **Vigilant**, commissioned: 1996
  - **Vengeance**, commissioned: 1999
- Astute class (PWR2 nuclear-powered hunter-killer)
  - **Astute**, commissioned: 2010
  - **Ambush**, commissioned: 2013
  - **Artful**, commissioned: 2016
  - **Audacious**, commissioned: 2020
  - **Anson**, commissioned: 2022
  - Agamemnon, commissioned: 2025
  - Achilles, under construction, expected commission: 2029
- Dreadnought (PWR3 nuclear-powered ballistic missile)
  - Dreadnought, under construction – first elements of construction underway in 2016
  - Valiant, under construction
  - Warspite, under construction
  - King George VI, under construction

== See also ==
- List of submarine classes of the Royal Navy
- Royal Navy Submarine Service
- List of submarines of the Second World War
