= List of submarine classes of the Royal Navy =

This is a list of submarine classes of the Royal Navy of the United Kingdom. Dates of construction given.

== Petrol-electric ==
	No.	First ship laid down	Last ship commissioned	Notes
Holland class	5	HMS Holland 1 2 October 1901	HMS Holland 5 1902	First submarines of the Royal Navy
A class	13	HMS A1 19 February 1902	HMS A13 22 June 1908	Royal Navy's first class of British-designed submarines
B class	11	HMS B1 25 October 1904	HMS B11 1906	
C class	38	HMS C1 13 November 1905	HMS C38 10 February 1910	Last class of petrol powered submarines of the Royal Navy

== Diesel-electric ==
- D class — 8 boats, 1908–1912
- E class — 58 boats, 1912–1916
- F class — 3 boats, 1913–1917
- S class — 3 boats, 1914–1915
- V class — 4 boats, 1914–1915
- W class — 4 boats, 1914–1915
- G class — 14 boats, 1915–1917
- H class — 44 boats, 1915–1919
- J class — 7 boats, 1915–1917
- L class — 34 boats, 1917–1919
- M class — 3 boats, 1917–1918
- Nautilus class — 1 boat, 1917
- R class — 12 boats, 1918
- HMS X1 — 1 boat, 1921
- Odin class — 9 boats 1926–29 (subclasses Oberon 1 boat, Oxley 2 boats, Odin 6 boats)
- Parthian class — 6 boats, 1929
- Rainbow class — 4 boats, 1930
- S class — 62 boats (subclasses Swordfish 4, Shark 8, Seraph 33, Subtle 17), 1931–1945
- Thames class — 3 boats, 1932
- Grampus class — 6 boats, 1932–1938
- T class — 52 boats (subclasses Triton 15, Tempest 15, Taciturn 22), 1937–1945
- Undine class — 3 boats, 1937–1938
- P611 class — 4 boats, 1940
- Umpire class — 37 boats, 1940–1943
- Vampire class — 22 boats, 1943–1944
- Amphion class — 16 boats, 1945–1947
- Explorer class — 2 boats, 1954–1955
- Stickleback class — 4 boats, 1954–1955
- Porpoise class — 8 boats, 1956–1959
- Oberon class — 13 boats, 1959–1966
- Upholder class — 4 boats, 1986–1992

== Midget ==
- X class — 20 boats, 1943–1944
- XE class — 12 boats, 1944
- Stickleback class — 4 boats, 1954–1955

== Rescue submersible ==
- LR5 — leased to the Royal Australian Navy in 2009

== Steam-electric ==
- Swordfish — 1 boat, 1916–1922
- K class — 22 boats, 1916–1919

== Foreign-built ==
- Archimede class — 1 boat, 1934
- Type VIIC U-boat — 1 boat, 1941
- Type XVII U-boat — 1 boat, 1943
- Type XXIII U-boat — 2 boats, 1945

== Nuclear powered ==
=== Land Based Prototype ===
- HMS Vulcan PWR 1 (Dounreay Submarine Prototype 1) 1965–1984
- HMS Vulcan PWR 2 (Shore Test Facility) 1987–present

=== Fleet ===
- Dreadnought — one boat, 1959–1962
- Valiant class — 2 boats, 1962–1965
- Churchill class — 3 boats, 1967–1970
- Swiftsure class — 6 boats, 1969–1979
- Trafalgar class — 7 boats, 1979–1991
- Astute class — 7 boats planned (6 commissioned of which 5 in service), 2001 to 2029
- SSN AUKUS class - 12 boats planned, building from latter 2020s/early 2030s

=== Ballistic missile ===
- Resolution class — 4 boats, 1964–1986
- Vanguard class — 4 boats, 1986–1998
- Dreadnought class — 4 boats planned, 2016 to mid/latter 2030s

== See also ==
- Royal Navy Submarine Service
- List of submarines of the Royal Navy
