= HMS K5 =

Royal Navy K-class submarine (1917 to 1921)

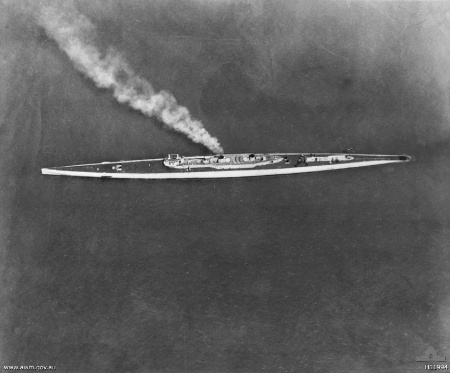
- Aerial view of K5 showing smoke from steam engine

History

United Kingdom
- Name: HMS K5
- Launched: 16 December 1916
- Commissioned: 1917
- Fate: Sunk 1921

General characteristics
- Class & type: K-class submarine
- Displacement: 1,980 long tons (2,010 t) surfaced; 2,566 long tons (2,607 t) submerged
- Length: 339 ft (103 m)
- Beam: 26 ft 6 in (8.08 m)
- Draught: 20 ft 11 in (6.38 m)
- Installed power: 21,000 shp (16,000 kW) (steam engines); 5,760 hp (4,300 kW) (electric motors); 800 hp (600 kW) (diesel generator)
- Propulsion: 2 × Brown-Curtis or Parsons geared steam turbines; 2 × Yarrow boilers; 4 × electric motors; 1 × Vickers diesel generator for charging batteries on the surface; 2 × 3-blade 7 ft 6 in (2.29 m) diameter screws
- Speed: 24 kn (28 mph; 44 km/h) surfaced; 8 kn (9.2 mph; 15 km/h) submerged
- Range: Surfaced: 800 nmi (920 mi; 1,500 km) at 24 kn (28 mph; 44 km/h); 12,500 nmi (14,400 mi; 23,200 km) at 10 kn (12 mph; 19 km/h); Submerged: 8 nmi (9.2 mi; 15 km) at 8 kn (9.2 mph; 15 km/h); 40 nmi (46 mi; 74 km) at 4 kn (4.6 mph; 7.4 km/h)
- Complement: 59 (6 officers and 53 ratings)
- Armament: 8 × 18 inch (450 mm) torpedo tubes, (4 beam, 4 bow), 8 spare torpedoes, 2 × 18 inch torpedo tubes fitted on deck, later removed, 2 × 4 in (100 mm) guns, 1 × 3 in (76 mm) gun

HMS K5 was one of the K-class submarines that served in the Royal Navy from 1917–1921. She was lost with all hands when she sank en route to a mock battle in the Bay of Biscay.

== War service ==
At the end of the war in 1918, K5 was part of the 12th Submarine Flotilla based at Rosyth, along with six others of the K-class.

== Loss ==
K5 left Torbay on 19 January 1921 with the K8, K10, K15 and K22 as part of the Atlantic Fleet for a mock battle in the Bay of Biscay.

The submarine was commanded by an experienced officer, Lieutenant Commander John A Gaimes, DSO, RN, but had a new crew. The other officers on board were Lieutenant F Cuddeford, Engineer-Lieutenant E Bowles, Acting Engineer-Lieutenant G Baker, Lieutenant B Clarke and Acting Lieutenant R Middlemist. The full complement included 51 ratings on board.

All 57 hands were lost on 20 January about 120 mi (190 km) south-west of the Isles of Scilly. She had signalled that she was diving but she did not surface at the end of the exercise. An oil slick was discovered and after planks from the battery covers and a sailor's "ditty box" were recovered, it was presumed that she had somehow gone past her maximum depth and been crushed.

On return from her exercises in the Mediterranean in 1922, Hood and the rest of the fleet dropped wreaths and held a memorial service where K5 had gone down.

== Problems with the K-class ==
Retired Rear-Admiral S.S. Hall wrote in The Times under the heading "An Experts Theory" "...it may be taken as certain that the loss of the vessel was due to some delay to checking the downward momentum gained by the vessel being overtrimmed in diving, either by admitting compressed air too slowly to too many tanks at one time, to tanks only partially full, or to a sea connexion being closed prematurely."

The waters where the battle exercises were taking place were so deep that the vessel would have been crushed, losing control due to the intake of water. Admiral Hall wrote that it was "not clear why the 'K' class should be taken for cruises in the Atlantic in winter." He describes the submarines as 'freaks' that were designed especially for the conditions of the North Sea during World War I. "The high surface speed necessitates great length, and the further complication of steam demands very large openings for funnels and air intakes to boiler rooms. These have always been a source of great anxiety in bad weather or in rapid diving." He also drew attention to the need for a thoroughly trained crew to operate them safely.

K13 suffered a similar fate during her acceptance trials, when she foundered with the loss of 32 of those on board. The cause of the incident was related to the openings to which Hall refers.
