= HMS Victorious (S29) =

1995 Vanguard-class nuclear-powered ballistic missile submarine of the Royal Navy

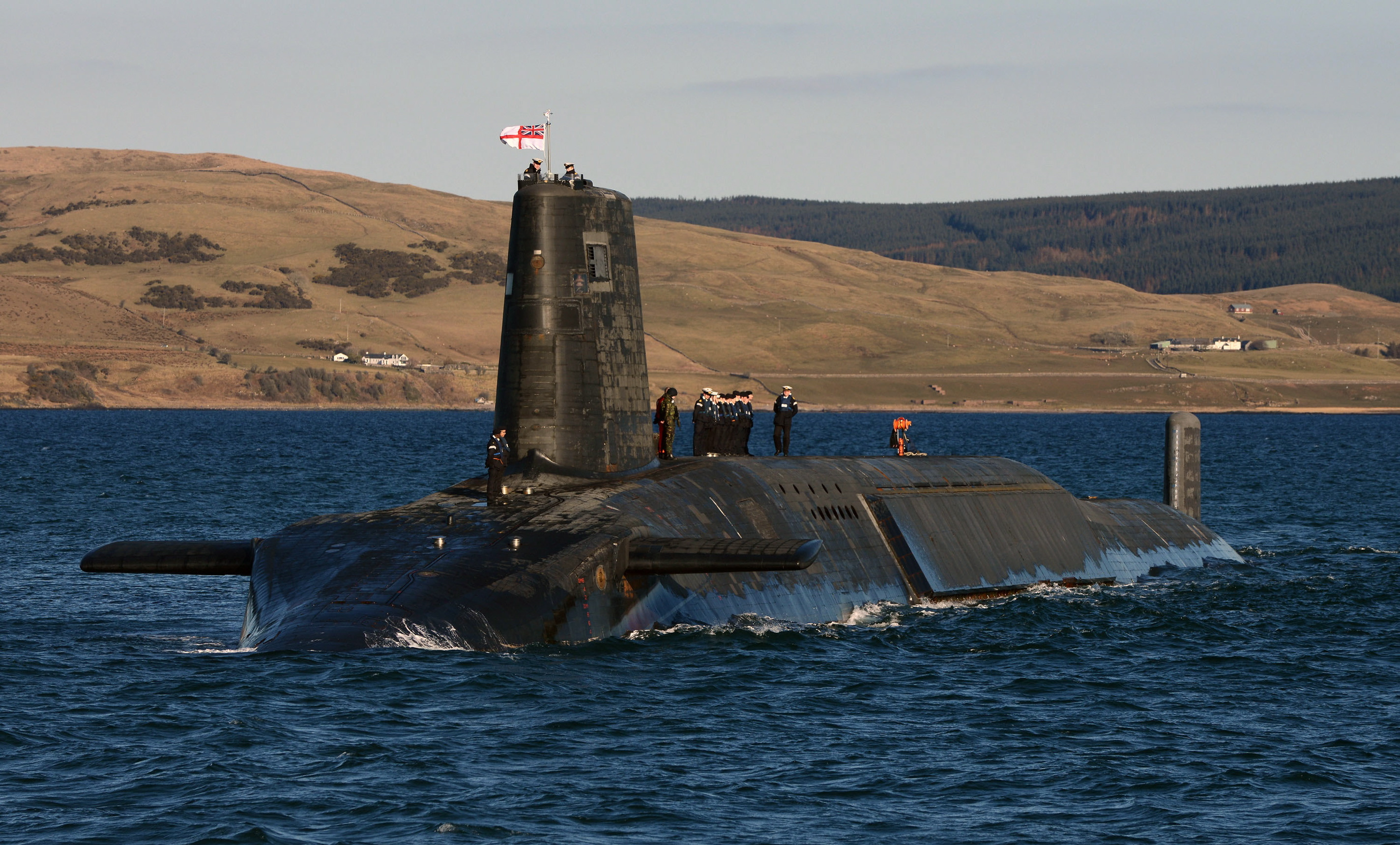
- Victorious near Faslane, Scotland in April 2013.

History

United Kingdom
- Name: HMS Victorious
- Laid down: 3 December 1987
- Launched: 29 September 1993
- Commissioned: 7 January 1995
- Home port: HMNB Clyde
- Status: In refit
- Badge

General characteristics
- Class & type: Vanguard-class submarine
- Displacement: 15,900 tonnes, submerged
- Length: 149.9 m (491 ft 10 in)
- Beam: 12.8 m (42 ft 0 in)
- Draught: 12 m (39 ft 4 in)
- Propulsion: 1 × Rolls-Royce PWR2 nuclear reactor, 2 × GEC turbines; 27,500 shp (20.5 MW); 1 × shaft, pump jet propulsor; 2 × auxiliary retractable propulsion motors; 2 × Allen turbo generators (6 MW); 2 × Paxman diesel alternators; 2,700 shp (2.0 MW)
- Speed: In excess of 25 knots (46 km/h; 29 mph), submerged
- Range: Only limited by food and maintenance requirements.
- Complement: 135
- Sensors & processing systems: BAE Systems SMCS; Kelvin Hughes Type 1007 I-band navigation radar; Thales Underwater Systems Type 2054 composite sonar suite comprising: Marconi/Ferranti Type 2046 towed array sonar; Type 2043 hull-mounted active and passive search sonar; Type 2082 passive intercept and ranging sonar; Pilkington Optronics CK51 search periscope; Pilkington Optronics CH91 attack periscope
- Electronic warfare & decoys: Two SSE Mk10 launchers for Type 2066 and Type 2071 torpedo decoys; RESM Racal UAP passive intercept
- Armament: 4 × 21-inch (533 mm) torpedo tubes for: Spearfish heavyweight torpedoes; 16 × ballistic missile tubes for: Lockheed Trident II D5 SLBMs with up to 12 MIRVed Holbrook Mk-4A (100 kt_{TNT}) nuclear warheads each

HMS Victorious is the second Vanguard-class submarine of the Royal Navy. Victorious carries the Trident ballistic missile, the UK's nuclear deterrent.

Victorious was built at Barrow-in-Furness by Vickers Shipbuilding and Engineering Ltd, later BAE Systems Submarine Solutions, was launched in September 1993, and commissioned in January 1995.

== Operational history ==
In November 2000, while travelling on the surface, Victorious grounded on Skelmorlie Bank in the upper Firth of Clyde in Scotland.

She became the second of the class to refit, during which time she was fitted with a Core H reactor ensuring that the boat will not need to refuel again until the end of its service life. In 2008, she underwent sea trials before resuming patrols in 2009.

In 2013, Victorious completed the UK's 100th deterrent patrol by a Vanguard-class submarine.

In 2022, Victorious was forced to surface in the North Atlantic after a fire broke out in an electrical module. A Royal Navy spokesperson said the submarine was not actively deployed on a continuous at-sea deterrent (CASD) patrol, but was instead en route to the United States for a series of exercises. Victorious subsequently returned to her homebase in Faslane, Scotland.

== Affiliations ==
- The Highlanders, 4th Battalion Royal Regiment of Scotland

== See also ==
- Letters of last resort
- List of submarines of the Royal Navy
- List of submarine classes of the Royal Navy
- Nuclear weapons and the United Kingdom
- Royal Navy Submarine Service
- Submarine-launched ballistic missile
- Trident nuclear programme
