= John Gaimes =

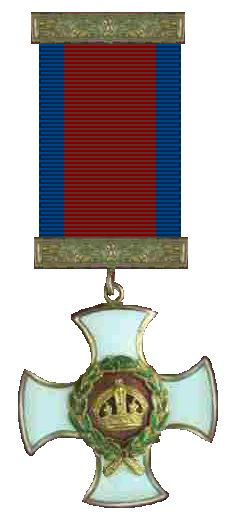
- Born: 1887
- Died: January 1921 (aged 33–34); Lost at sea with HMS K5
- Burial place: Bay of Biscay.
- Military career
- Allegiance: (United Kingdom) British Empire
- Branch: Royal Navy
- Service years: 1901–1921
- Rank: Commander
- Commands: HMS A9; HMS B9; HMS C37; HMS K5
- Conflicts: World War I
- Awards: DSO

Lieutenant-Commander John Austin Gaimes, DSO, was a submarine commander for the Royal Navy. He died 20 January 1921, at the age of 33, when HMS K5 sank with the loss of all hands during a mock battle in the Bay of Biscay.

== History of service ==
- 1901, posted to the training ship HMS Britannia.
- Served as second-in-command of the destroyer HMS Syren for a year.
- Volunteered for British submarine command in 1908, appointed January 1909.
- Served on the C-class submarines.
- Appointed command of HMS A9 on 5 October 1911.
- A year later, appointed command of HMS B9.
- March 1913, captained HMS C37 in Hong Kong.
- 10 April 1917, commanded submarine in Harwich flotilla.
- Located the secret Heligoland passage, marked out by buoys for German warships to follow.
- June 1918, awarded the Distinguished Service Order (DSO) for war services.
- After World War I, commanded submarines attached to depot ship HMS Dolphin at Portsmouth.
- November 1919, appointed to cruiser HMS Inconstant for steam-driven vessels of the K-class in the First Flotilla.
- 1 April 1920, appointed command of HMS K5.
