= V-class submarine =

V-class submarine may refer to:

- British V-class submarine (1914), a class of British submarines built during World War I
- British V-class submarine, officially "U-Class Long hull 1941–42 program," a class of British submarines built during World War II
- K V-class submarine, a class of Dutch submarines built between 1916 and 1922
