= N71 =

N71 may refer to:

== Roads ==
- N71 road (Ireland)
- Nebraska Highway 71, in the United States

== Other uses ==
- N71 (Long Island bus)
- Nokia N71, a mobile phone
- HMS Thames (N71), a submarine of the Royal Navy
