= HMS K4 =

British K class submarine built by Vickers

Coordinates: 56°15′N 2°11′W

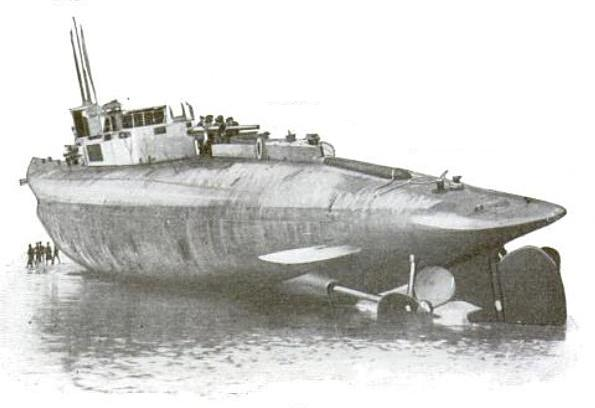
- HMS K4 beached on Walney Island

History

United Kingdom
- Name: HMS K4
- Builder: Vickers, Barrow-in-Furness
- Laid down: 28 June 1915
- Launched: 13 July 1916
- Commissioned: 1 January 1917
- Fate: Sunk, 31 January 1918

General characteristics
- Class & type: K-class submarine
- Displacement: 1,980 long tons (2,010 t) surfaced; 2,566 long tons (2,607 t) submerged
- Length: 339 ft (103 m)
- Beam: 26 ft 6 in (8.08 m)
- Draught: 20 ft 11 in (6.38 m)
- Installed power: 2 × Yarrow boilers
- Propulsion: 2 × 10,500 shp (7.8 MW) Brown-Curtis or Parsons geared steam turbines; 4 × 1,440 hp (1,070 kW) electric motors; 1 × 800 hp (600 kW) Vickers diesel generator for charging batteries on the surface; 2 × 3-blade 7 ft 6 in (2.29 m) diameter screws
- Speed: 24 knots (44 km/h; 28 mph) surfaced; 8 knots (15 km/h; 9.2 mph) submerged
- Range: Surfaced : 800 nmi (1,500 km; 920 mi) at 24 kn (44 km/h; 28 mph); 12,500 nmi (23,200 km; 14,400 mi) at 10 kn (19 km/h; 12 mph); Submerged : 8 nmi (15 km; 9.2 mi) at 8 kn (15 km/h; 9.2 mph); 40 nmi (74 km; 46 mi) at 4 kn (7.4 km/h; 4.6 mph)
- Complement: 59 (6 officers and 53 ratings)
- Armament: 8 × 18 in (460 mm) torpedo tubes, (4 beam, 4 bow); 8 × spare torpedoes; 2 × 18 in torpedo tubes fitted on deck (later removed); 2 × BL 4 in (100 mm) Mk.XI guns; 1 × 3 in (76 mm) gun

HMS K4 was a British K-class submarine built by Vickers in Barrow-in-Furness. She was laid down on 28 June 1915 and commissioned on 1 January 1917, one year before the end of World War I.

== Accidents ==
=== January 1917 ===
In January 1917 HMS K4 ran aground on Walney Island. The British submarine giant was stranded on its beach but was undamaged. She was refloated the next day.

=== Collision K1 ===
In November 1917, K4 collided with sister ship K1 during an accident off the Danish coast. The light cruiser Blonde operating with K1 had to make a sharp turn to avoid three units from the 4th Cruiser Squadron. And in the confusion, K4 collided with K1. The crew of K1 were rescued and K1 sunk by the Blonde. The K4 was under the command of Lieutenant-Commander Alfred Fenner. There is a blue plaque on the wall of his home in the town of Cromer in Norfolk.

== Loss ==
K4 was lost on 31 January 1918 during the night time fleet exercises later known as the Battle of May Island (Operation E.C.1) when she was attached to the 13th Submarine Flotilla. While attempting to avoid a collision with K3, she became the victim of collisions with K6 and K7. She was lost with all hands. The wreck is designated as a protected place under the Protection of Military Remains Act 1986.

== Bibliography ==
Notes

References

- Mansergh, Ruth (2015). Barrow-in-Furness in the Great War. Pen and Sword. ISBN 9781473859760. - Total pages: 160
- "British Submarine Giant". New-York Tribune. New York, NY: Ogden Mills Reid. 2020. p. 11. ISSN 1941-0646. OCLC 9405688.

== Publications ==
- Colledge, J. J.; Warlow, Ben (2006) [1969]. Ships of the Royal Navy: The Complete Record of All Fighting Ships of the Royal Navy from the 15th Century to the Present (3rd Rev ed.). London: Chatham Publishing. ISBN 978-1-86176-281-8. OCLC 67375475.
- Hutchinson, Robert (2005). Janes Submarines: War Beneath The Waves, from 1776 to the Present Day. HarperCollins. ISBN 0060819006.
