= HMS K1 =

Submarine of the Royal Navy

Coordinates: 56°20′20″N 5°43′50″E

History

United Kingdom
- Name: HMS K1
- Launched: 14 November 1916 at Portsmouth
- Fate: Sunk to prevent capture following accidental collision, 18 November 1917

General characteristics
- Class & type: K-class submarine
- Displacement: 1,980 long tons (2,010 t) (surfaced); 2,566 long tons (2,607 t) (submerged)
- Length: 339 ft (103 m)
- Beam: 26 ft 6 in (8.08 m)
- Draught: 20 ft 11 in (6.38 m)
- Installed power: 21,100 shp (15,700 kW) (steam turbines); 5,760 hp (4,300 kW) (electric motors); 800 hp (600 kW) (diesel generator)
- Propulsion: 2 × Brown-Curtis or Parsons geared steam turbines; 2 × oil-fired Yarrow boilers; 4 × electric motors; 1 × Vickers diesel generator for charging batteries on the surface; 2 × 3-blade 7 ft 6 in (2.29 m)-diameter screws
- Speed: 24 kn (28 mph; 44 km/h) (surfaced); 8 kn (9.2 mph; 15 km/h) (submerged)
- Range: Surfaced: 800 nmi (920 mi; 1,500 km) at 24 kn (28 mph; 44 km/h); 12,500 nmi (14,400 mi; 23,200 km) at 10 kn (12 mph; 19 km/h); Submerged: 8 nmi (9.2 mi; 15 km) at 8 kn (9.2 mph; 15 km/h); 40 nmi (46 mi; 74 km) at 4 kn (4.6 mph; 7.4 km/h)
- Complement: 59 (6 officers and 53 ratings)
- Armament: 8 × 18 inch (450 mm) torpedo tubes (4 bow, 4 beam; 8 spare torpedoes); 2 × 18 in (460 mm) torpedo tubes originally fitted on deck, but later removed; 2 × 4 in (100 mm) guns; 1 × 3 in (76 mm) gun

HMS K1 was a First World War steam turbine-propelled K-class submarine of the Royal Navy. K1 was sunk to prevent it being captured after colliding with K4 off the Danish coast. She had been patrolling on the surface as part of a flotilla of submarines operating in line ahead. The flotilla was led by the light cruiser Blonde, followed by K1, K3, K4, and K7. The crew survived and taken off by two cutters sent from HMS Blonde. The collision occurred at approx 17:35 and after consultation with the rescued submariner officers and concluding that the K1 could not be saved, Blonde opened fire with one of her 4 inch guns and sank the submarine with a few shells at 19:10 hours.

== Design ==
K1 displaced 1,800 long tons (1,800 t) when at the surface and 2,600 long tons (2,600 t) while submerged. It had a total length of 338 feet (103 m), a beam of 26 feet 6 inches (8.08 m), and a draught of 20 ft 11 in (6.38 m). The submarine was powered by two oil-fired Yarrow Shipbuilders boilers each supplying one geared Brown-Curtis or Parsons steam turbine; this developed 10,500 ship horsepower (7,800 kW) to drive two 7 ft 6 in (2.29 m) screws. Submerged power came from four electric motors each producing 350 to 360 horsepower (260 to 270 kW). It was also had an 800 hp (600 kW) diesel engine to be used when steam was being raised, or instead of raising steam.

The submarine had a maximum surface speed of 24 kn (44 km/h) and a submerged speed of 9 to 9.5 kn (16.7 to 17.6 km/h). It could operate at depths of 150 ft (46 m) at 2 kn (3.7 km/h) for 80 nmi (150 km). K1 was armed with ten 18-inch (460 mm) torpedo tubes, two 4-inch (100 mm) deck guns, and a 3-inch (76 mm) anti-aircraft gun. Its torpedo tubes were four in the bow, four in the midship section firing to the sides, and two were mounted on the deck in rotating mountings. Its complement was fifty-nine crew members.
