= HMS K10 =

Submarine of the Royal Navy

History

United Kingdom
- Name: HMS K10
- Builder: Vickers, Barrow-in-Furness
- Laid down: 28 June 1915
- Launched: 27 December 1916
- Commissioned: 26 June 1917
- Fate: Sold, 4 November 1921. Sunk

General characteristics
- Class & type: K-class submarine
- Displacement: 1,980 long tons (2,010 t) surfaced; 2,566 long tons (2,607 t) submerged
- Length: 339 ft (103 m)
- Beam: 26 ft 6 in (8.08 m)
- Draught: 20 ft 11 in (6.38 m)
- Propulsion: 2 × 10,500 shp (7.8 MW) Brown-Curtis or Parsons geared steam turbines; 2 × Yarrow boilers; 4 × 1,440 hp (1,070 kW) electric motors; 1 × 800 hp (600 kW) Vickers diesel generator for charging batteries on the surface; 2 × 3-blade 7 ft 6 in (2.29 m) diameter screws
- Speed: 24 knots (44 km/h; 28 mph) surfaced; 8 knots (15 km/h; 9.2 mph) submerged
- Range: Surfaced : 800 nmi (1,500 km; 920 mi) at 24 kn (44 km/h; 28 mph); 12,500 nmi (23,200 km; 14,400 mi) at 10 kn (19 km/h; 12 mph); Submerged : 8 nmi (15 km; 9.2 mi) at 8 kn (15 km/h; 9.2 mph); 40 nmi (46 mi; 74 km) at 4 kn (4.6 mph; 7.4 km/h)
- Complement: 59 (6 officers and 53 ratings)
- Armament: 8 × 18 in (460 mm) torpedo tubes, (4 beam, 4 bow); 8 × spare torpedoes; 2 × 18 in torpedo tubes fitted on deck (later removed); 2 × BL 4 in (100 mm) Mk.XI guns; 1 × 3 in (76 mm) gun

HMS K10 was a K class submarine built by Vickers, Barrow-in-Furness. She was laid down on 28 June 1915. She was commissioned on 26 June 1917. K10 was sold for scrap along with HMS K11 on 4 November 1921, both foundered in tow in the North Sea on 10 January 1922. It had a complement of fifty-nine crew members and a length of 338 feet (103 m)

== Design ==
K10 displaced 1,800 long tons (1,800 t) when at the surface and 2,600 long tons (2,600 t) while submerged. It had a total length of 338 feet (103 m), a beam of 26 feet 6 inches (8.08 m), and a draught of 20 ft 11 in (6.38 m). The submarine was powered by two oil-fired Yarrow Shipbuilders boilers each supplying one geared Brown-Curtis or Parsons steam turbine; this developed 10,500 ship horsepower (7,800 kW) to drive two 7 ft 6 in (2.29 m) screws. Submerged power came from four electric motors each producing 350 to 360 horsepower (260 to 270 kW). It was also had an 800 hp (600 kW) diesel engine to be used when steam was being raised, or instead of raising steam.

The submarine had a maximum surface speed of 24 kn (44 km/h) and a submerged speed of 9 to 9.5 kn (16.7 to 17.6 km/h). It could operate at depths of 150 ft (46 m) at 2 kn (3.7 km/h) for 80 nmi (150 km). K10 was armed with ten 18-inch (460 mm) torpedo tubes, two 4-inch (100 mm) deck guns, and a 3-inch (76 mm) anti-aircraft gun. Its torpedo tubes were four in the bow, four in the midship section firing to the sides, and two were mounted on the deck in rotating mountings. Its complement was fifty-nine crew members. Its conning tower was made of rare beryllium copper which is nonmagnetic so the ship's compass was unaffected. The conn was raised in 2026.

== Bibliography ==
- Hutchinson, Robert. Submarines, War Beneath The Waves, from 1776 to the Present Day.
