= HMS K16 =

Submarine of the Royal Navy

History

United Kingdom
- Name: HMS K16
- Builder: William Beardmore and Company, Dalmuir
- Laid down: June 1916
- Launched: 5 November 1917
- Commissioned: 13 April 1918
- Decommissioned: 12 December 1920
- Fate: Sold, 22 August 1924

General characteristics
- Class & type: K-class submarine
- Displacement: 1,980 long tons (2,010 t) surfaced; 2,566 long tons (2,607 t) submerged
- Length: 339 ft (103 m)
- Beam: 26 ft 6 in (8.08 m)
- Draught: 20 ft 11 in (6.38 m)
- Propulsion: 2 × 10,500 shp (7.8 MW) Brown-Curtis or Parsons geared steam turbines; 2 × Yarrow boilers; 4 × 1,440 hp (1,070 kW) electric motors; 1 × 800 hp (600 kW) Vickers diesel generator for charging batteries on the surface; 2 × 3-blade 7 ft 6 in (2.29 m) diameter screws
- Speed: 24 knots (44 km/h; 28 mph) surfaced; 8 knots (15 km/h; 9.2 mph) submerged
- Range: Surfaced : 800 nmi (1,500 km; 920 mi) at 24 kn (44 km/h; 28 mph); 12,500 nmi (23,200 km; 14,400 mi) at 10 kn (19 km/h; 12 mph); Submerged : 8 nmi (15 km; 9.2 mi) at 8 kn (15 km/h; 9.2 mph); 40 nmi (46 mi; 74 km) at 4 kn (4.6 mph; 7.4 km/h)
- Complement: 59 (6 officers and 53 ratings)
- Armament: 8 × 18 in (460 mm) torpedo tubes, (4 beam, 4 bow); 8 × spare torpedoes; 2 × 18 in torpedo tubes fitted on deck (later removed); 2 × BL 4 in (100 mm) Mk.XI guns; 1 × 3 in (76 mm) gun

HMS K16 was a K class submarine built by William Beardmore and Company, Dalmuir. She was laid down in June 1916 and commissioned on 13 April 1918.

The only incident that occurred with K16 was a sudden dive in Gare Loch after her hydroplanes failed. She surfaced successfully. K16 paid off on 12 December 1920. She was sold on 22 August 1924 and was resold in September 1924 in Charlestown.

== Design ==
K16 displaced 1,800 long tons (1,800 t) when at the surface and 2,600 long tons (2,600 t) while submerged. It had a total length of 338 ft (103 m), a beam of 26 ft 6 in (8.08 m), and a draught of 20 ft 11 in (6.38 m). The submarine was powered by two oil-fired Yarrow Shipbuilders boilers each supplying one geared Brown-Curtis or Parsons steam turbine; this developed 10,500 shaft horsepower (7,800 kW) to drive two 7 ft 6 in (2.29 m) screws. Submerged power came from four electric motors each producing 350 to 360 horsepower (260 to 270 kW). It was also had an 800 hp (600 kW) diesel engine to be used when steam was being raised, or instead of raising steam.

The submarine had a maximum surface speed of 24 kn (44 km/h) and a submerged speed of 9 to 9.5 kn (16.7 to 17.6 km/h). It could operate at a maximum depth of 150 ft (46 m) and travel submerged at 2 kn (3.7 km/h) for 80 nmi (150 km). K16 was armed with ten 18-inch (460 mm) torpedo tubes, two 4-inch (100 mm) deck guns, and a 3-inch (76 mm) anti-aircraft gun. The torpedo tubes were mounted in the bow, the midship section firing to the beam, and two were in a rotating mounting on the deck. Its complement was fifty-nine crew members.

== Bibliography ==
- Hutchinson, Robert (November 2005). Submarines, War Beneath The Waves, from 1776 to the Present Day. HarperCollins. ISBN 978-0-06-081900-2.
