= HMS K8 =

Submarine of the Royal Navy

History

United Kingdom
- Name: HMS K8
- Builder: Vickers, Barrow-in-Furness
- Laid down: 28 June 1915
- Launched: 10 October 1916
- Commissioned: 6 March 1917
- Fate: Sold 11 October 1923

General characteristics
- Class & type: K class submarine
- Displacement: 1,980 long tons (2,010 t) surfaced; 2,566 long tons (2,607 t) submerged
- Length: 339 ft (103 m)
- Beam: 26 ft 6 in (8.08 m)
- Draught: 20 ft 11 in (6.38 m)
- Propulsion: 2 × Brown-Curtis or Parsons geared steam turbines, 10,500 shp (7.8 MW) each; 2 × Oil-fired Yarrow boilers; 4 × Electric motors, 1,440 hp (1070 kW) each; 1 × Vickers diesel generator for charging batteries on the surface, 800 hp (600 kW); 2 × 3-blade 7 ft 6 in (2.29 m) diameter screws
- Speed: 24 knots (28 mph; 44 km/h) surfaced; 8 knots (9.2 mph; 15 km/h) submerged
- Range: Surfaced: 800 nmi (1,500 km) at 24 kn (44 km/h); 12,500 nmi (23,200 km) at 10 kn (19 km/h); Submerged: 8 nmi (15 km) at 8 kn (15 km/h); 40 nmi (74 km) at 4 kn (7.4 km/h)
- Complement: 59 (6 officers and 53 ratings)
- Armament: 8 × 18 inch (450 mm) torpedo tubes (4 beam, 4 bow), 8 spare torpedoes; 2 × 4 in (100 mm) guns; 1 × 3 in (76 mm) gun

HMS K8 was a British K class submarine built by Vickers, Barrow-in-Furness. She was laid down on 28 June 1915 and was commissioned on 6 March 1917. K8 was sold on 11 October 1923. It had a complement of fifty-nine crew members and had a length of 338 feet (103 m).

== Design ==
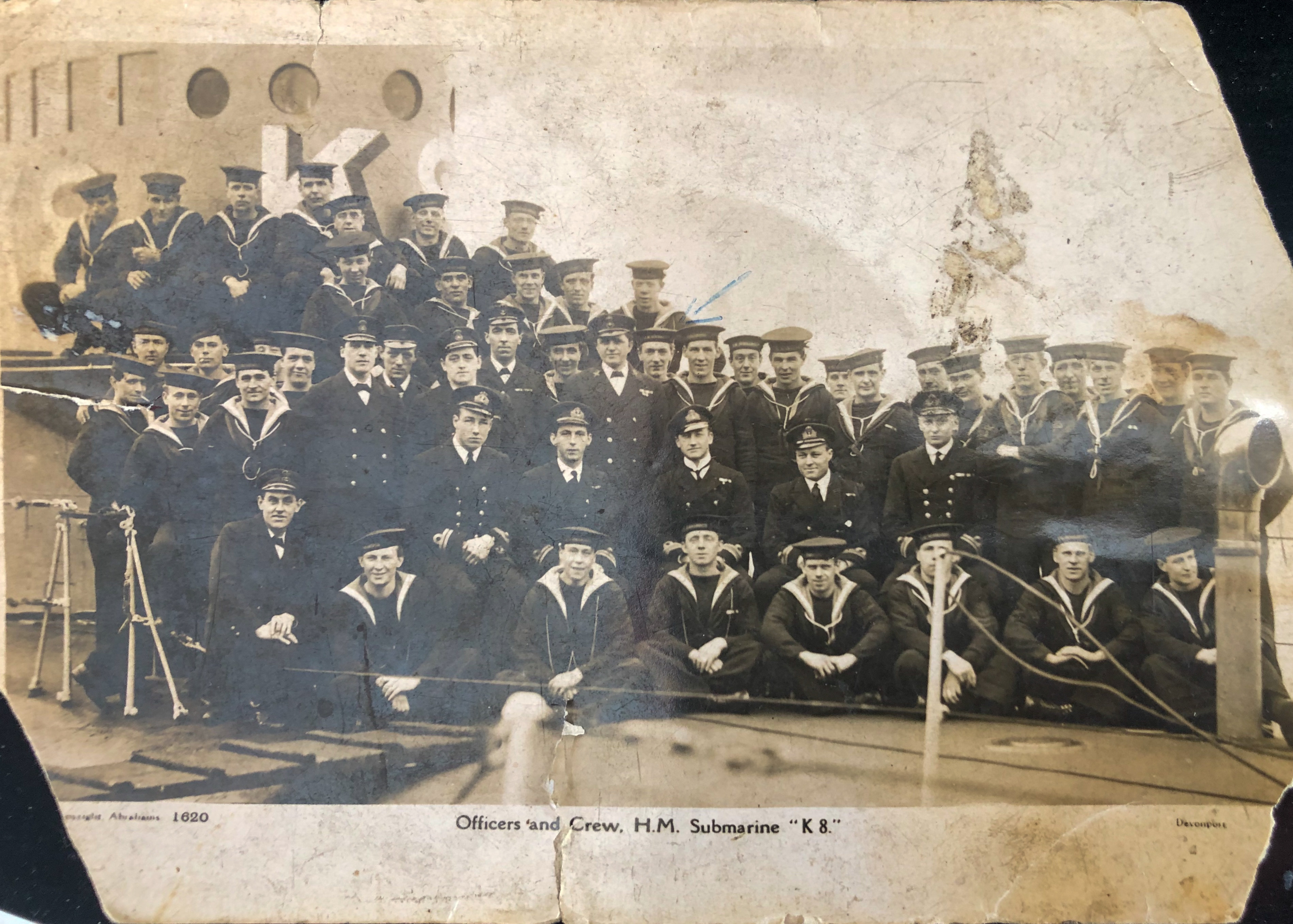
Officers and crew HMS K8 submarine

K8 displaced 1,800 long tons (1,800 t) when at the surface and 2,600 long tons (2,600 t) while submerged. It had a total length of 338 feet (103 m), a beam of 26 feet 6 inches (8.08 m), and a draught of 20 ft 11 in (6.38 m). The submarine was powered by two oil-fired Yarrow Shipbuilders boilers each supplying one geared Brown-Curtis or Parsons steam turbine; this developed 10,500 ship horsepower (7,800 kW) to drive two 7 ft 6 in (2.29 m) screws. Submerged power came from four electric motors each producing 350 to 360 horsepower (260 to 270 kW). It was also had an 800 hp (600 kW) diesel engine to be used when steam was being raised, or instead of raising steam.

The submarine had a maximum surface speed of 24 kn (44 km/h) and a submerged speed of 9 to 9.5 kn (16.7 to 17.6 km/h). It could operate at depths of 150 ft (46 m) at 2 kn (3.7 km/h) for 80 nmi (150 km). K8 was armed with ten 18-inch (460 mm) torpedo tubes, two 4-inch (100 mm) deck guns, and a 3-inch (76 mm) anti-aircraft gun. Its torpedo tubes were four in the bow, four in the midship section firing to the sides, and two were mounted on the deck in a rotating mounting. Its complement was fifty-nine crew members.

== Bibliography ==
- Robert Hutchinson, Submarines, war beneath the waves, from 1776 to the present day
