= British V-class submarine (1914) =

British V-class submarines built in WW I

- A British V-class submarine

Class overview
- Name: V class
- Builders: Vickers, Barrow
- Operators: Royal Navy
- Completed: 4
- Retired: 4

General characteristics
- Type: Submarine
- Displacement: 391 tons surfaced; 457 tons submerged
- Length: 45.0 m (147 ft 8 in)
- Beam: 5.0 m (16 ft 5 in)
- Draught: 3.5 m (11 ft 6 in)
- Propulsion: 2 shaft Vickers 8-cyl diesels, 2 electric motors, 900 / 380 hp
- Speed: 14 knots (26 km/h; 16 mph) surfaced; 8.5 knots (15.7 km/h; 9.8 mph) submerged
- Range: 3,000 nmi (5,600 km; 3,500 mi) at 9 knots (17 km/h; 10 mph) surfaced
- Complement: 20
- Armament: 2 × 18 inch torpedo tubes – 4 torpedoes

The British V-class submarines were built by Vickers, Barrow during World War I in response to Scotts, Greenock building the S class and Armstrong Whitworth building the W class.

Four V-class submarines were built.

== Boats ==
Ship	Laid down	Launched	Completed	Fate
V1	November 1912	23 July 1914	May 1915	Sold November 1921
V2	October 1913	17 February 1915	November 1915	Sold November 1921
V3	January 1914	1 April 1915	January 1916	Sold October 1920
V4	February 1914	25 November 1915	March 1916	Sold October 1920
