= HMS Swordfish (1916) =

British experimental submarine

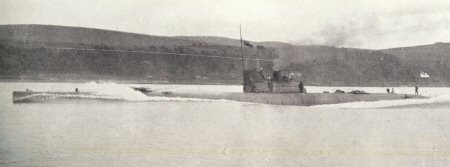
- HMS Swordfish

History

United Kingdom (RN)
- Name: HMS Swordfish
- Ordered: 8 August 1913
- Builder: Scotts Shipbuilding and Engineering Company, Greenock
- Laid down: 28 February 1914
- Launched: 18 March 1916
- Commissioned: 28 April 1916
- Decommissioned: 30 October 1918
- Renamed: HMS S1 on 28 April 1916; Reverted to HMS Swordfish in July 1917
- Fate: Sold for scrapping in July 1922; Resold in 1923

General characteristics
- Displacement: 932 long tons (947 t) (surface); 1,105 long tons (1,123 t) (submerged)
- Length: 231 ft 3.5 in (70.498 m) (overall)
- Beam: 22 ft 11 in (6.99 m)
- Draught: 14 ft 11 in (4.55 m)
- Installed power: 4,000 shp (3,000 kW) (turbines); 1,400 bhp (1,000 kW) (electric motors)
- Propulsion: 2 shafts, 2 geared steam turbines; 1 boiler, 2 electric motors
- Speed: 18 knots (33 km/h; 21 mph) surfaced (designed); 10 knots (19 km/h; 12 mph) submerged
- Range: 3,000 nautical miles (5,600 km; 3,500 mi) at 8.5 knots (15.7 km/h; 9.8 mph)
- Complement: 18
- Armament: 2 × 3-inch (76 mm) guns; 2 × 21-inch (530 mm) torpedo tubes (bow); 4 × 18-inch (460 mm) torpedo tubes (beam)

HMS Swordfish was an experimental submarine built for the Royal Navy before the First World War to meet the Navy's goal of an "overseas" submarine capable of 20 knots (37 km/h; 23 mph) on the surface. Diesel engines of the period were unreliable and not very powerful so steam turbines were proposed instead to meet the RN's requirement. Swordfish proved to be slower than designed and unstable while surfacing, and consequently she was modified as an anti-submarine patrol vessel in 1917. She was paid off before the end of the war and sold for scrapping in 1922.

== Design ==
HMS Swordfish was developed to meet a requirement of Royal Navy's Submarine Committee for a large submarine capable of operating with the fleet at a surfaced speed of 20 knots (37 km/h; 23 mph). Most of the earlier British submarines had been single-hulled vessels built by Vickers, and the Navy was interested in evaluating other designs. Captain Roger Keyes, Inspecting Captain of Submarines, had previously served as naval attaché in Italy and had kept abreast of Italian submarine developments, which notably included double-hulled submarines designed by Cesare Laurenti of Fiat-San Giorgio. Three boats of the S class were ordered first and Laurenti was invited to submit a design to meet the RN requirement.

Fiat-San Giorgio "was wary about using heavy oil diesel engines and hesitated to guarantee the success of such engines of the power required. At the same time Laurenti prepared a design with geared steam turbines having a speed of 18 knots on a surface displacement of 856 tons." His design was modified by Scotts Shipbuilding and Engineering Company, Greenock, to include guns. Swordfish kept the same main dimensions as Laurenti's original design, but had a greater displacement and less endurance.

== Description ==
Swordfish had an overall length of 231 ft 3.5 in (70.498 m), a beam of 22 ft 11 in (6.99 m), and a draught of 14 feet 11 inches (4.55 m). She displaced 932 long tons (947 t) on the surface and 1,105 long tons (1,123 t) submerged. She had a partial double hull, which extended over 75% of her length. The upper portion of the double hull was controlled free-flooding while the rest was devoted to watertight 'baling flats', ballast and fuel tanks. Her hull was divided into eight compartments by seven watertight bulkheads.

Swordfish's diving depth and time are not known because the records from her sea trials have not survived. Shutting down her boiler, retracting the funnel and sealing the boiler uptake required about a minute and a quarter, which included switching over to the electric motors. In marked contrast to contemporary Vickers designs much attention was paid to safety arrangements, including her extensive subdivision. Indicator and telephone buoys, which could be released from inside the submarine were provided together with external air connections and a charged high-pressure line which could provide air to any manned compartment or the living spaces. Furthermore, the main ballast tanks could be blown from either end of the ship.

=== Propulsion ===
Swordfish had two Parsons geared impulse-reaction steam turbine sets, each driving one of the two propeller shafts. The turbines were powered by a single Yarrow-type boiler. They were designed to produce a total of 4,000 shaft horsepower (3,000 kW) at a working pressure of 250 psi (1,700 kPa; 18 kgf/cm^{2}) which used a superheater to increase the working temperature by 100 °F (38 °C). She was fitted with two electric motors which had a combined output of 1,400 bhp (1,000 kW). Two battery rooms each had 64 battery cells. It is uncertain if the ship reached her designed speed of 18 knots (33 km/h; 21 mph) on the surface, although it seems unlikely given her increased displacement over Laurenti's original design. Maximum speed was 10 knots (19 km/h; 12 mph) underwater.

Swordfish could carry 102 long tons (104 t) of fuel oil, which her builders estimated gave her an endurance of 3,000 nautical miles (5,600 km; 3,500 mi) at a speed of 8.5 knots (15.7 km/h; 9.8 mph) on the surface. On her batteries her submerged endurance was 60 nautical miles (110 km; 69 mi) at a speed of 6 knots (11 km/h; 6.9 mph).

=== Armament ===
Swordfish had two tubes for 21-inch (530 mm) torpedoes in her bow. They were stepped vertically and positioned well back from the stem in a notch from the keel to preserve the fine lines of the bow. Two 18-inch (460 mm) torpedo tubes were positioned on each beam amidships. Each torpedo tube was provided with one reload. Two 3-inch (76 mm) guns (Note: The exact type of 3-inch gun is unknown.) were fitted on the deck in disappearing mounts, one each fore and aft of the conning tower. They were covered by watertight hoods to preserve the streamlining of the submarine.

== Construction and service ==
Swordfish was ordered from Scotts Shipbuilding and Engineering Company on 18 August 1913 although she was not laid down until 28 February 1914. The start of the First World War six months later greatly hindered her completion, and she was not launched until 18 March 1916. HMS Swordfish was commissioned on 28 April 1916, before completion, and renamed HMS S1 that same day. She was not completed until 21 July.

Captained by Commander Geoffrey Layton, her post-completion trials lasted for five months as she was used to evaluate steam power for submarine use. Much was learned about the operation of steam submarines, which helped the subsequent design of the steam-powered K-class fleet submarines. She proved to be very unstable while surfacing, presumably because she could not pump the water out of her controlled free-flooding spaces quickly enough in the upper part of her double hull. These problems, coupled with the fact that she was too slow to work with the fleet as originally envisioned, meant that she was impossible to make into an effective warship, and she was laid up after her trials.

In July 1917 S1 reverted to her original name and was converted to a surface patrol vessel between 27 June 1917 and 24 January 1918. Her torpedo tubes and disappearing guns were removed. She was given a forecastle, a bridge and her funnel was fixed in place and extended. She was rearmed with a pair of 12-pounder (Note: The exact model of 12-pounder fitted is unknown.) (3 in, 76 mm) guns and depth charges, weapons more suitable for her new role as an anti-submarine patrol boat. Swordfish joined the 1st Destroyer Flotilla at Portsmouth upon completion of her sea trials, but nothing is known of her subsequent service.

Swordfish was paid off on 30 October 1918 and stricken from the Navy List by January 1919. She was sold for scrapping to Pounds, of Portsmouth in July 1922, but was reported to have been resold to Hayes, of Porthcawl in 1923.
