= HMS K3 =

Submarine of the Royal Navy

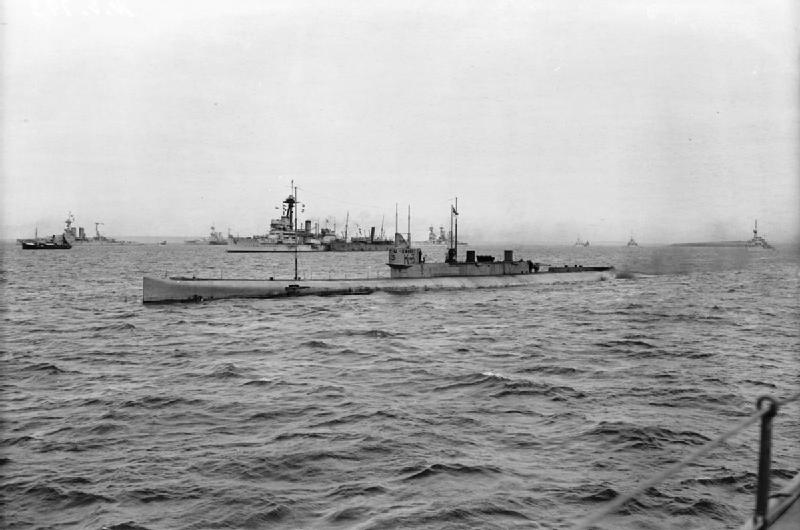
- Passing the surrendered battleships of the German Grand Fleet, between November 1918 and June 1919

History

United Kingdom
- Name: HMS K3
- Builder: Vickers, Barrow-in-Furness
- Laid down: 21 May 1915
- Launched: 20 May 1916
- Commissioned: 4 August 1916
- Fate: Sold for scrapping 26 October 1921

General characteristics
- Class & type: K class submarine
- Displacement: 1,980 long tons (2,010 t) surfaced; 2,566 long tons (2,607 t) submerged
- Length: 339 ft (103 m)
- Beam: 26 ft 6 in (8.08 m)
- Draught: 20 ft 11 in (6.38 m)
- Propulsion: 2 × Brown-Curtis or Parsons geared steam turbines, 10,500 shp (7.8 MW) each; 2 × Oil-fired Yarrow boilers; 4 × Electric motors, 1,440 hp (1070 kW) each; 1 × Vickers diesel generator for charging batteries on the surface, 800 hp (600 kW); 2 × 3-blade 7 ft 6 in (2.29 m) diameter screws
- Speed: 24 knots (28 mph; 44 km/h) surfaced; 8 knots (9.2 mph; 15 km/h) submerged
- Range: Surfaced: 800 nmi (1,500 km) at 24 kn (44 km/h); 12,500 nmi (23,200 km) at 10 kn (19 km/h); Submerged: 8 nmi (15 km) at 8 kn (15 km/h); 40 nmi (74 km) at 4 kn (7.4 km/h)
- Complement: 59 (6 officers and 53 ratings)
- Armament: 8 × 18 inch (450 mm) torpedo tubes, (4 beam, 4 bow), 8 spare torpedoes; 2 × 18 inch torpedo tubes fitted on deck, later removed; 2 × 4 in (102 mm) guns; 1 × 3 in (76 mm) gun

HMS K3 was the lead ship of the British K-class submarines. She was laid down on 21 May 1915 by Vickers, Barrow-in-Furness. She was commissioned on 4 August 1916.

In December 1916, K3, with the future King George VI aboard, uncontrollably dived. The ship plunged to 150 feet with the stern and propellers raised above the waves. It took twenty minutes to free the ship from the sea bed mud and surface successfully.

On 9 January 1917, K3’s boiler room was flooded in the North Sea. K3 was involved in an accident with the 4th Light Cruiser Squadron, that led to the sinking of K1, in November 1917. K3 was also involved in the "Battle of May Island" in 1918. On 2 May 1918, K3 yet again uncontrollably dived to 266 feet which crushed part of the hull.

K3 was sold on 26 October 1921 to the Barking Ship Breaking Company for scrapping in London.
