= HMS X1 =

British commerce raider

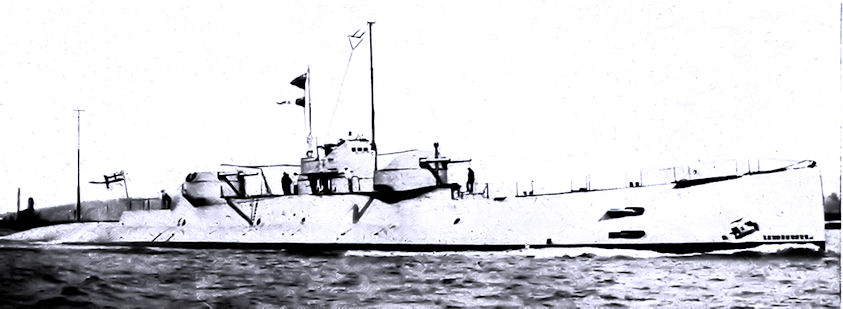

History

United Kingdom
- Name: X1
- Builder: HM Dockyard, Chatham
- Laid down: 2 November 1921
- Launched: 16 June 1923
- Completed: 23 September 1925
- Commissioned: December 1925
- Fate: Scrapped, 12 December 1936

General characteristics
- Displacement: 2,780 long tons (2,820 t) (surfaced); 3,600 long tons (3,700 t) (submerged)
- Length: 363 ft 6 in (110.8 m)
- Beam: 29 ft 9 in (9.1 m)
- Draught: 15 ft (4.6 m)
- Installed power: 4,200 bhp (3,100 kW) (diesels); 1,000 bhp (750 kW) (electric motors)
- Propulsion: 4 × diesel engines; 2 × electric motors
- Speed: 19.5 kn (36.1 km/h) surfaced; 9 kn (17 km/h) submerged
- Endurance: Surfaced: 12,400 nmi (23,000 km; 14,300 mi) at 12 knots (22 km/h; 14 mph) (Note: 18,700 nmi (34,600 km; 21,500 mi) at 8 knots (15 km/h; 9.2 mph)); Submerged: 50 nmi (93 km; 58 mi) at 4 knots (7.4 km/h; 4.6 mph)
- Test depth: 350 ft (110 m)
- Complement: 111 (11 officers and 100 ratings)
- Armament: 6 × 21 inch (533 mm) bow torpedo tubes; 2 × twin 5.2 in (13.2 cm) guns

HM Submarine X1 was a British submarine of the interwar period. Conceived and designed as a submersible commerce raider for the Royal Navy; at the time of her launching she was the largest submarine in the world. For Britain, the idea of a submarine cruiser had been proposed as early as 1915, but the type was not put into practice until after the end of World War I in 1918. X1 was laid down on 2 November 1921 at HM Dockyard, Chatham and completed on 23 September 1925 with commissioning following in December 1925.

The 1922 Washington Naval Treaty, of which Britain was a signatory, did not ban submarines but it did ban their use against merchant ships, which was X1's unacknowledged purpose; its armament had been designed to successfully engage the classes of vessels likely to be escorting convoys, such as destroyers and frigates. Therefore, a certain amount of secrecy surrounded X1, the government even going to the lengths of taking a national newspaper to court over its pictures of the new submarine following her launch, all copies of the paper being seized.

== Description ==
The X1's 1-inch (25 mm) thick pressure hull was 19 feet 7.5 inches (6.0 m) in diameter amidships, and was divided into 10 watertight compartments. This was almost completely surrounded by her external hull, which also contained the main ballast tanks and most of her fuel. Her intended maximum diving depth was 500 feet (150 m), but was reduced to 350 feet (110 m) once in service.

=== Armament ===
X1 carried four QF 5.2 inch Mk I guns in twin unarmoured turrets, one forward and one aft of the conning tower. They had a range of about 16,000 yards (15,000 m). A circular trunk ran from each mounting to the magazine in the pressure hull which contained 100 rounds per gun. A working chamber which was 10 feet (3.0 m) in diameter encircled the trunk between the pressure hull and the gun mount. Her ammunition hoists were problematic and could not sustain the desired rate of fire of six rounds per gun per minute. Special ballast tanks were used to compensate for the loss of weight as ammunition was fired. Working and control of the guns required 58 men. The fire-control tower was in the middle of the conning tower and had a top section that could be raised 2 feet (0.61 m) when in use. The upper control room was between the tower and the pressure hull. Just aft of the control room was the rangefinding room, with a 9-foot (2.7 m) rangefinder on the bridge that could be raised 8 feet (2.4 m).

Her six bow tubes for 21-inch (533 mm) torpedoes came from a cancelled L-class submarine and she was provided with one reload for each tube. It took 24 minutes to reload them all because space in the torpedo room was restricted.

=== Propulsion ===
The main engines were two 8-cylinder Admiralty diesel engines with a total output of 3,000 brake horsepower (2,200 kW). Two auxiliary 1,200-horsepower (890 kW) MAN diesel engines taken from the German submarine U-126 were installed for battery-charging purposes. For underwater propulsion, two GEC electric motors of 1,000 horsepower (750 kW) each were fitted. It was hoped to achieve over 8,000 horsepower (6,000 kW) using both diesels and electric motors together, but the highest power achieved (during a full power trial in March 1926) was 7,135 horsepower (5,321 kW). She had three groups of batteries, each with 110 cells weighing a total of 70 long tons (71 t). In theory she could make 19.5 knots (36.1 km/h; 22.4 mph) on the surface, and at economical speed she had a greater range than normal cruisers, but both sets of diesel engines suffered from continual mechanical problems that reduced her speed and range. The X1's average diving time to periscope depth was 2 minutes 20 seconds. Her handling underwater was considered superior to other submarines of the period.

== Career ==
After X1 was commissioned in December 1925 and accepted in April 1926 she made a voyage to Gibraltar after which her main engine drive wheels were found to be damaged. After repairs she was sent to the Mediterranean Sea. Her starboard camshaft driveshaft broke during a full-power run in January 1928 and a new set of gears was needed, but after refitting at Malta her port camshaft driveshaft broke in the same place in April 1928. By 1930 her commanding officer reported "internal arrangements not very satisfactory because of overcrowding with auxiliary machinery, accommodation is cramped, ventilation poor and the ship suffers from humidity, diving arrangements good." Both the main and auxiliary engines were troublesome and she spent most of her time under repair, before being laid up. X1 was placed in reserve after 1930, before she was finally scrapped at Pembroke on 12 December 1936.

== See also ==
- British M-class submarine — an earlier attempt at a large gun-armed submarine
- SM U-139 - U-139 class (Projekt 46); one of three German First World War submarine cruisers
- Surcouf — a similar French large gun-armed submarine
