= HMS Thames (N71) =

Submarine of the Royal Navy

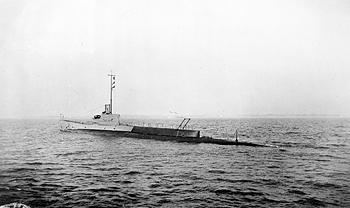
- HMS Thames

History

United Kingdom
- Name: HMS Thames
- Ordered: 1931
- Builder: Vickers-Armstrongs, Barrow
- Launched: 26 February 1932
- Home port: Dundee
- Fate: Missing, probably mined 23 July 1940
- Badge

General characteristics
- Displacement: 2,165 tons surfaced; 2,680 tons submerged
- Length: 345 ft (105 m)
- Beam: 28 ft 3 in (8.61 m)
- Draught: 15 ft 11 in (4.85 m)
- Propulsion: 2 shaft diesel electric; 2 supercharged diesels 10,000 hp max; 2 electric motors 2500 hp
- Speed: 22 knots surfaced; 10 knots submerged
- Complement: 61
- Sensors & processing systems: ASDIC
- Armament: 6 × 21 inch (533 mm) torpedo tubes (bow); 1 × 4 inch Mk XVI deck gun

HMS Thames (N71) was an ocean-going type of submarine of the River Class. She was built by Vickers-Armstrongs, Barrow and launched on 26 February 1932. She was completed on 14 September 1932, and after commissioning was assigned to the Mediterranean, stationed at Malta.

== Service history ==
She had a short career in the Second World War. In August 1939 she was recalled to home waters, and was assigned to 9th Submarine Flotilla with the Home Fleet. From there she undertook interception patrols, searching for German U-boats, surface raiders and blockade runners. After refitting during the winter she was active in the North Sea in spring 1940 during the Norwegian campaign. In July 1940 Thames torpedoed and sank the German torpedo boat Luchs. Luchs was part of the escort for the damaged German battleship Gneisenau that was on passage from Trondheim, Norway to Kiel, Germany.

== Fate ==
Thames was reported overdue on 3 August 1940, and had probably struck a mine off Norway in late July or early August 1940. As HMS Thames was operating from Dundee with the 9th Submarine Flotilla when she was lost, her crew are all commemorated on Dundee International Submarine Memorial. The crew members are also commemorated at the Royal Navy Submarine Museum.
