= River-class submarine =

Type of British submarines in service during WWII

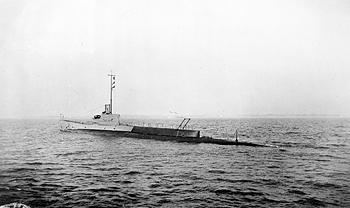
- HMS Thames

Class overview
- Name: River-class
- Builders: Vickers-Armstrong
- Operators: Royal Navy
- Preceded by: S class
- Succeeded by: Grampus class
- Cost: circa £500,000 (in 1931-1933)
- Built: 1931-1934
- In service: 1934-1945
- In commission: 1934-1945
- Planned: 20
- Completed: 3
- Cancelled: 17
- Lost: 1
- Retired: 2

General characteristics
- Type: Submarine
- Displacement: 2,206 tons surfaced (Thames 2,165 tons); 2,723 tons submerged (Thames 2,680 tons)
- Length: 345 ft (105 m)
- Beam: 28 ft 3 in (8.61 m)
- Draught: 15 ft 11 in (4.85 m)
- Propulsion: 2 shaft diesel electric; 2 supercharged diesels 10,000 hp (7,500 kW) max; 2 electric motors 2,500 hp (1,900 kW)
- Speed: 22 knots (41 km/h) surfaced; 10 knots (19 km/h) submerged
- Range: 12,000 nmi (22,000 km; 14,000 mi) at 12 kn (22 km/h; 14 mph) surfaced
- Test depth: 300 feet (91 m), entered into records as max depth
- Complement: 61
- Sensors & processing systems: ASDIC
- Armament: 6 × 21-inch (533 mm) torpedo tubes (bow); 1 × QF 4-inch (101.6 mm) Mk XII deck gun
- Notes: Last fleet submarine design adopted by the Royal Navy

The River class, or Thames class, were a class of submarines built for the Royal Navy. Operating during the Second World War, the three boats of the class comprised Thames, Severn and Clyde. All the submarines were named after rivers in the United Kingdom. One was lost during the war and the rest taken out of service following it.

== Design ==
The River class was the last attempt by the Admiralty to produce "fleet submarines", submarines fast enough to operate as part of a fleet, which at the time meant being able to manage somewhere around 20 knots (37 km/h) while surfaced. The previous attempts had been the steam powered K-class submarines and the large 12-inch (305 mm) gunned M-class submarines. The M class were K-class hulls re-engined with diesels and modified to take a single 12 in (305 mm) naval gun directly forward of the conning tower.

A design was drawn up in the late 1920s and three vessels were built by Vickers in Barrow: Thames in 1932, and Severn and Clyde in 1935. The latter two were a little larger than Thames. Initially 20 were planned, but changes in thinking and cost-cuts limited the building to just the three.

The design compromised on diving depth to keep weight down and speed up. They had a safe diving depth of some 300 feet (90 m) compared to the Odin class before them which had managed 500 feet (150 m). They were powered by two diesel engines delivering 8,000 bhp (6,000 kW). Two Ricardo engines drove generators that supercharged the diesels up to 10,000 bhp (7,500 kW). This gave them a surface speed of 22 knots (41 km/h). A rather unfortunate fault with the River-class was a tendency for engine trouble after several long journeys. Another alarming fault, although this was confined to Clyde was the hydroplanes failing, causing the submarine to bottom. This would put a great stress on the hull of the submarine, as it was of riveted construction, rather than the welded construction of other British submarines.

== Operational history ==
During the Second World War, they initially operated in the North Sea and Mediterranean, then moved to the Far East in the latter stages.

Clyde and Severn set sail from Gibraltar heading to take up station in Freetown on 31 August 1939, just four days before the outbreak of hostilities. On their arrival, they joined South Atlantic Command and were tasked with convoy defence duties. They arrived on September 7, with Clyde departing on her first war patrol the following day.

Thames was lost off Norway on 23 September 1940 during an operation to sink the German Battlecruiser Gneisenau. It failed to do this, but sank the escorting torpedo boat Luchs. The wreck of the Thames is yet to be found. When it is discovered, it is highly likely that it is to be left alone, because like all ships lost in wartime, it is considered to be a war grave.

Clyde was used on six occasions to deliver supplies to the besieged island of Malta in September 1941. Severn was used as part of the escort for Convoy SL16F in January 1940, along with the Armed Merchant Cruiser HMS Cheshire and the destroyers HMS Hardy and HMS Hostile. Convoy duty was not something that was alien to Severn and Clyde, as they would carry out this duty on a regular basis due to their long range. Clyde and Severn would both go through an extensive refit in the USA

Severn had the most colourful service out of all three. It would be used in the aftermath of the Battle of the River Plate to hunt for German Surface Raiders and their support ships. April 5, 1940 would see Severn join the northbound convoy FN139. It would also be put on standby for potential involvement in the hunt for the Bismarck, but the Bismarck was sunk before the Severn was called into action. It would be used for part of Operation Hawthorn during June - July 1943. Severn and Clyde, whether it was by choice or accident, would often be stationed together. Severn and Clyde were in service in the Far East (operating out of Trincomalee) when they were taken out of service - Severn in December 1944 and Clyde in July 1945. Both ships were believed to have been scrapped by the end of 1946.

== Boats ==
- HMS Thames (N71) - accounted for 1 enemy vessel
- HMS Severn (N57) - accounted for 4 enemy vessels
- HMS Clyde (N12) - accounted for 6 enemy vessels

== Bibliography ==
- Caruana, Joseph (2012). "Emergency Victualling of Malta During WWII". Warship International. LXIX (4): 357–364. ISSN 0043-0374.
- Conway's All the World's Fighting Ships 1922–1946
- D.K. Brown - Nelson to Vanguard, Chatham Maritime Press ISBN 1-86176-136-8
- Jane's Fighting Ships of World War II. 1998. p. 63. ISBN 1-85501-994-9.
