= HMS Nautilus (1914) =

Submarine in the Royal Navy

History

United Kingdom
- Name: HMS Nautilus
- Ordered: 1912
- Builder: Vickers
- Laid down: March 1913
- Launched: 16 December 1914
- Renamed: HMS N1 in June, 1917
- Fate: Sold 9 June 1922 to Cashmore, Newport

General characteristics
- Displacement: 1,441 tons surfaced/ 2,026 tons submerged
- Length: 258 ft 6 in (78.79 m)
- Beam: 17 ft 9 in (5.41 m)
- Draught: 26 ft (7.9 m)
- Propulsion: 2 shaft diesel, 2 electric motors 3,700 bhp 1,000 shp
- Speed: 17 knots (31 km/h) surfaced/ 10 knots (19 km/h) submerged
- Range: 5,300 nmi (9,820 km) at 11 knots (20 km/h)
- Complement: 42
- Armament: Eight 18-inch (457 mm) torpedo tubes (2 bow, 4 beam, 2 stern), 16 torpedoes, one 3 inch AA gun

HMS Nautilus was a Royal Navy submarine. She was the largest submarine built for the Royal Navy at the time. She was also the first to be given a name.

Nautilus was designed in response to recommendations for an overseas submarine displacing 1,000 tons and capable of 20 knots (37 km/h; 23 mph). The resulting design changed from the saddle tanks common at the time to a double hull.

The order was given to Vickers in 1912 and her keel was laid down in March 1913. Although launched in 1914 it took until 1917 to complete the vessel. Nautilus spent most of her life with the 1st Submarine Flotilla at Portsmouth as a depot ship and later as a battery charging vessel. She was renamed N1 in June 1917.

Following decommissioning she was sold for scrap to John Cashmore Ltd on 9 June 1922 and broken up at their yard at Newport, Wales.

== Publications ==
- Preston, Antony (2001). The Royal Navy submarine service: a centennial history. London: Conway Maritime. ISBN 978-0851778914.
- Colledge, J. J.; Warlow, Ben (2006) [1969]. Ships of the Royal Navy: The Complete Record of All Fighting Ships of the Royal Navy from the 15th Century to the Present (3rd Rev ed.). London: Chatham Publishing. ISBN 978-1-86176-281-8. OCLC 67375475.

== See also ==
- List of submarines of the Royal Navy
