= HMS K7 =

British K Class Submarine

History

United Kingdom
- Name: HMS K7
- Builder: HM Dockyard Devonport
- Laid down: 8 November 1915
- Launched: 31 May 1916
- Commissioned: July 1917
- Fate: Sold, 9 September 1921

General characteristics
- Class & type: K-class submarine
- Displacement: 1,980 long tons (2,010 t) surfaced; 2,566 long tons (2,607 t) submerged
- Length: 339 ft (103 m)
- Beam: 26 ft 6 in (8.08 m)
- Draught: 20 ft 11 in (6.38 m)
- Propulsion: 2 × 10,500 shp (7.8 MW) Brown-Curtis or Parsons geared steam turbines; 2 × Yarrow boilers; 4 × 1,440 hp (1,070 kW) electric motors; 1 × 800 hp (600 kW) Vickers diesel generator for charging batteries on the surface; 2 × 3-blade 7 ft 6 in (2.29 m) diameter screws
- Speed: 24 knots (44 km/h; 28 mph) surfaced; 8 knots (15 km/h; 9.2 mph) submerged
- Range: Surfaced : 800 nmi (1,500 km; 920 mi) at 24 kn (44 km/h; 28 mph); 12,500 nmi (23,200 km; 14,400 mi) at 10 kn (19 km/h; 12 mph); Submerged : 8 nmi (15 km; 9.2 mi) at 8 kn (15 km/h; 9.2 mph); 40 nmi (46 mi; 74 km) at 4 kn (4.6 mph; 7.4 km/h)
- Complement: 59 (6 officers and 53 ratings)
- Armament: 8 × 18 in (460 mm) torpedo tubes, (4 beam, 4 bow); 8 × spare torpedoes; 2 × 18 in torpedo tubes fitted on deck (later removed); 2 × BL 4 in (100 mm) Mk.XI guns; 1 × 3 in (76 mm) gun

HMS K7 was a K class submarine built by HM Dockyard, Devonport. She was laid down on 8 November 1915 and commissioned in July 1917.

K7 was the only one of the disastrous K class to engage with an enemy; on 16 June 1917 she fired a salvo of torpedoes at the U-boat U-95 and scored a direct hit. However, the torpedo failed to explode with what has been described as typical "K" luck; K-7 escaped retaliation by steaming away at speed.

K7 was involved in an accident with the 4th Light Cruiser Squadron. She was also involved in the catastrophic series of accidents during a night exercise that came to be known sarcastically as the Battle of May Island; K7 was damaged by running over the sinking K4. K7 was sold on 9 September 1921 at Sunderland.

== Design ==
K7 displaced 1,800 long tons (1,800 t) when at the surface and 2,600 long tons (2,600 t) while submerged. It had a total length of 338 feet (103 m), a beam of 26 feet 6 inches (8.08 m), and a draught of 20 ft 11 in (6.38 m). The submarine was powered by two oil-fired Yarrow Shipbuilders boilers supplying one geared Brown-Curtis or Parsons steam turbine that developed 10,500 ship horsepower (7,800 kW) to drive two 7 ft 6 in (2.29 m) screws. Submerged power came from four electric motors each producing 350 to 360 horsepower (260 to 270 kW). It also had an 800 hp (600 kW) diesel engine to be used when steam was being raised, or instead of raising steam.

The submarine had a maximum surface speed of 24 kn (44 km/h) and a submerged speed of 9 to 9.5 kn (16.7 to 17.6 km/h). It could operate at depths of 150 ft (46 m) at 2 kn (3.7 km/h) for 80 nmi (150 km). K7 was armed with ten 18-inch (460 mm) torpedo tubes, two 4-inch (100 mm) deck guns, and a 3-inch (76 mm) anti-aircraft gun. Its torpedo tubes were fitted to the bow, the midship section, and two were mounted on the deck. Its complement was fifty-nine crew members.

== Bibliography ==
- Hutchinson, Robert. Submarines, War Beneath The Waves, from 1776 to the Present Day.
