= British W-class submarine =

Experimental submarines of British Royal Navy

Class overview
- Builders: Armstrong Whitworth
- Operators: Royal Navy
- Completed: 4

General characteristics
- Type: Submarine
- Displacement: 331 tons surfaced/499 tons submerged (W1 & W2); 321 tons surfaced/379 tons submerged (W3 & W4)
- Length: 171 ft 11 in (52.4 m) (W1 & W2); 149 ft 11 in (45.7 m) (W3 & W4)
- Beam: 15 ft 4 in (4.7 m) (W1 & W2); 17 ft 10 in (5.4 m) (W3 & W4)
- Propulsion: 2-shaft diesel, electric motors, 740 bhp (550 kW)/ 380 shp (280 kW)
- Speed: 13 knots (24 km/h; 15 mph) surfaced; 8 knots (15 km/h; 9.2 mph) submerged
- Range: 2,500 nmi (4,600 km; 2,900 mi) at 9 knots (17 km/h; 10 mph)
- Complement: 18
- Armament: 2 × 18 in (460 mm) torpedo tubes in the bow; 4 × 18 in torpedoes in external drop collars

The W-class submarines were built for the Royal Navy as experimental boats. They were based on a French Schneider-Laubeuf design. The design for W3 and W4 was heavily modified to meet Royal Navy requirements, overcoming some of the deficiencies of the 'off the shelf' design. In particular, the drop collars were removed in the later boats.

Only four W-class submarines were built from 1913 to 1916. The first two boats took 15 and 17 months to build, which at the time was a remarkable feat compared to other building times.

The W class had very good performance, with excellent diving control and efficient venting and flooding systems. The class did have problems with habitability, but other than that, they were good submarines.

All four of the W-class submarine were transferred to the Italian Navy in August 1916, where they retained their numbering.

- HMS W1, launched 19 November 1914
- HMS W2, launched 15 February 1915
- HMS W3, launched 1 April 1915
- HMS W4, launched 26 November 1915
