= HMS Ithuriel (1916) =

Marksman-class flotilla leader of the British Royal Navy

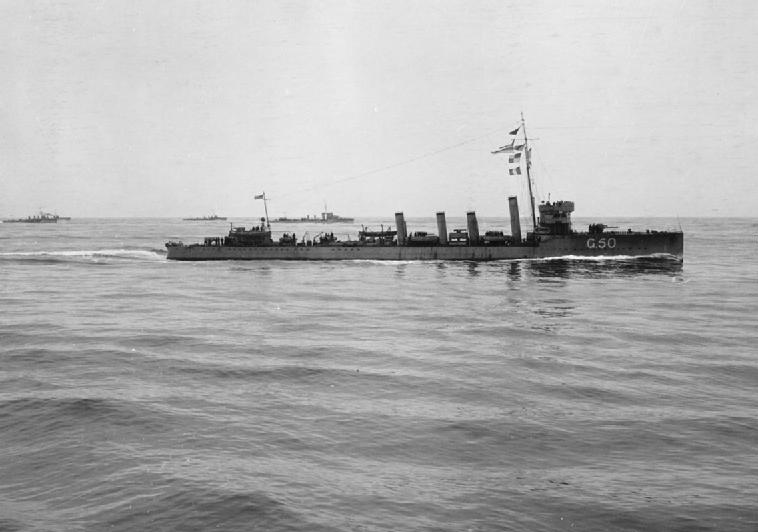
- HMS Ithuriel

History

United Kingdom
- Name: HMS Ithuriel
- Namesake: Ithuriel
- Builder: Cammell Laird, Birkenhead, England
- Laid down: 14 January 1915
- Launched: 8 March 1916
- Commissioned: 2 August 1916
- Fate: Sold for scrapping 8 November 1921 and broken up in Germany

General characteristics
- Class & type: Marksman-class flotilla leader
- Displacement: 1,700 long tons (1,700 t) (full load)
- Length: 324 ft 10 in (99.01 m) o/a
- Beam: 31 ft 9 in (9.68 m)
- Draught: 12 ft 0 in (3.66 m)
- Propulsion: Oil-fired Yarrow type boilers; Parsons steam turbines; 2 shafts; 36,000 shp (27,000 kW)
- Speed: 34 knots (39 mph; 63 km/h)
- Complement: 106—116
- Armament: 2 × QF 4-inch (101.6 mm) Mk IV guns; 2 × single 2 pdr "pom-pom" Mk. II AA guns; 2 × twin 21 inch (533 mm) torpedo tubes

HMS Ithuriel was a Marksman-class flotilla leader of the British Royal Navy. Originally to have been named Gabriel, the name was changed before her launch. The ship was built by Cammell Laird at Birkenhead, being launched on 8 March 1916 and entering service in August that year. Ithuriel served with the Grand Fleet during the First World War, leading both a destroyer flotilla and a submarine flotilla. She survived the war, before being sold for scrap on 8 November 1921.

== Construction and design ==
In November 1914, as part of the Emergency War Programme of shipbuilding, the British Admiralty ordered three Marksman-class flotilla leaders (i.e. large destroyers intended to lead flotillas of smaller destroyers in action) from the Birkenhead shipyard Cammell Laird. (Note: The first two ships of the class, Marksman and Lightfoot, were ordered as part of the 1913–1914 shipbuilding programme, with two more ships, Kempenfelt and Nimrod as part of the 1914–1915 programme.) The second of these three ships, HMS Ithuriel (originally to be named Gabriel) was laid down on 14 January 1915 and was launched on 8 March 1916. The construction of the three Marksman-class ships by Cammell Laird was problematical, with the ships suffering machinery problems and construction delays, with the Admiralty complaining to Lairds that "better workmanship and supervision" were needed for Ithurial and Gabriel, which were 8 months behind programme. Ithuriel was commissioned on 2 August 1916.

The Marksman-class ships were 324 feet 10 inches (99.01 m) long overall, 324 ft (99 m) at the waterline and 315 ft 0 in (96.01 m) between perpendiculars. They had a beam of 31 ft 9 in (9.68 m) and a draught of 12 ft 0 in (3.66 m). The design displacement was 1,440 long tons (1,460 t) normal and 1,700 long tons (1,700 t) full load. (Note: Jane's Fighting Ships gave a displacement of 1,655 long tons (1,682 t) in 1919.) Ithuriel was propelled by three sets of Parsons steam turbines, fed by four Yarrow three-drum boilers, rated at 36,000 shaft horsepower (27,000 kW), which gave a speed of 34 kn (39 mph; 63 km/h). Four funnels were fitted. Up to 515 tons of oil fuel could be carried, giving a range of 4,290 nautical miles (7,950 km; 4,940 mi) at 15 knots (28 km/h; 17 mph). The ship's crew was 104 officers and men.

Ithuriel was armed with four QF 4-inch (102 mm) Mk IV guns mounted on the ships centreline, with two 2-pounder (40-mm) "pom-pom" anti-aircraft guns and four 21 inch (533 mm) torpedo tubes.

== Service ==
On commissioning, Ithuriel joined the 14th Destroyer Flotilla, serving as one of two leaders for the flotilla (the other being the Faulknor-class flotilla leader Botha), with normal duties including escorting the ships of the Grand Fleet. From 15 June 1917 the destroyers and submarines of the Grand Fleet took part in Operation BB, a large scale operation against German submarines, with 53 destroyers and leaders together with 17 submarines deployed on offensive patrols on the transit route for the Germans from the North Sea and around the Orkney and Shetland Islands to the Western Approaches. Ithuriel led eight destroyers of the 14th Flotilla on patrol to the west of Shetland. Heavy seas made the 14th Flotilla's patrol duties difficult, with it being forced to take shelter in St Magnus Bay on 22 June. Only one submarine was sighted by the ships of the 14th Flotilla during the operation, on 23 June, when Mons sighted and unsuccessfully attacked a submarine (possibly U-55 or U-61). Overall, 61 sightings were made of German submarines were made by the destroyers and submarines of the Grand Fleet until the operation ended on 24 June, of which 12 resulted in attacks on the submarines, but no submarines were sunk or damaged. In October 1917, the Grand Fleet carried out another large-scale anti-submarine operation, in which destroyers and submarines were to be used to drive German U-boats that were returning to port from operations and passing to the east of the Dogger Bank into a large (several miles long) array of mine nets. Ithuriel took part in this operation, and again was forced to take shelter with her flotilla by heavy seas, this time in Aberdeen and Peterhead on 4 October, with the weather making it impossible for the ships to patrol. The operation lasted for 10 days, and British Intelligence believed that three U-boats were probably sunk in the operation. However, the submarines in question were almost certainly lost in other mine-fields.

In October 1917, Ithuriel left the 14th Destroyer Flotilla, joining the 13th Submarine Flotilla, still part of the Grand Fleet, consisting of K-class submarines, fast, steam-powered submarines intended to operate with the fleet. On the night of 31 January 1918, units of the Grand Fleet, including the K-class equipped 13th Submarine Flotilla (Ithuriel and the submarines K11, K12, K14, K17 and K22) and 12th Submarine Flotilla (the light cruiser Fearless and the submarines K3, K4, K6 and K7) set out from Rosyth to take part in exercises. Despite the night being very dark, with occasional patches of fog, the ships were running without lights. When K14 altered course to avoid a number of minesweepers ahead or her, her rudder jammed and she was rammed by K22. The two disabled submarines were then overtaken by the heavier units of the fleet, and K22 was rammed by the battlecruiser Inflexible. Despite the damage, both submarines remained afloat. On hearing distress signals from the two submarines, Commander E. Leir aboard Ithuriel decided to turn the Flotilla back to go to the assistance of K14 and K22. This put the flotilla on a collision course with the rest of the fleet, including the 12th Submarine Flotilla. On meeting the fleet, Ithuriel had to turn to avoid the battlecruiser Australia, which took the flotilla directly into the path of the 12th Flotilla. Fearless collided with K17, which sank, then K4, following Fearless, pulled out of line and stopped to avoid hitting K17 and Fearless, and was herself hit by K6, which cut K4 in two and K7. Two submarines had been sunk with 103 killed.

Ithuriel remained as leader of the 13th Submarine Flotilla through the end of the war, and remained when the Flotilla was renamed the 1st Submarine Flotilla in April 1919. She was relieved by the light cruiser Inconstant in October 1919, and after a short period at Rosyth, was sent to Portsmouth, being reduced to care and maintenance status on 1 December 1919. By February 1921, Ithuriel had been transferred to the disposal list, and was sold to the Slough Trading Company on 8 November that year for £2,402. She left Portsmouth for scrapping in Germany on 22 March 1923.

== Pennant numbers ==
Pennant number	From	To
G32	September 1916	March 1917
G50	March 1917	September 1917
G51	September 1917	January 1918
F88	January 1918	October 1919
G63	November 1919	-
