= HMS K13 =

British K Class submarine

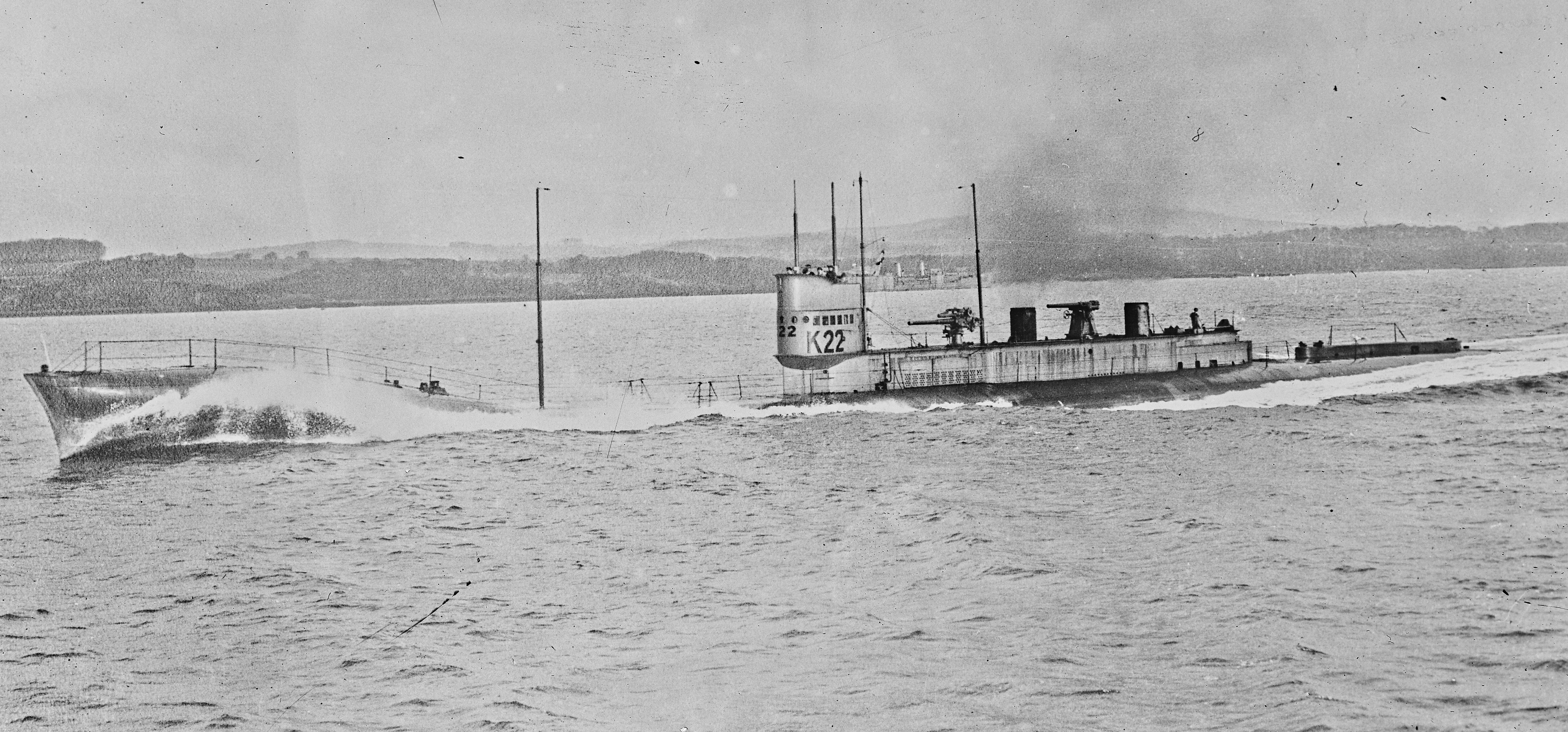
- The K22 in Plymouth in January 1921.

History

United Kingdom
- Name: HMS K13
- Ordered: August 1915
- Builder: Fairfield Shipbuilders, Glasgow
- Launched: 11 November 1916
- Fate: Sold for scrapping 16 December 1926 in Sunderland

General characteristics
- Class & type: K-class submarine
- Displacement: 1,980 tons surfaced; 2,566 tons submerged
- Length: 339 ft (103 m)
- Beam: 26 ft 6 in (8.08 m)
- Draught: 20 ft 11 in (6.38 m)
- Propulsion: Twin 10,500 shp (7.8 MW) oil-fired Yarrow boilers each powering a Brown-Curtis or Parsons geared steam turbines; Twin 3-blade 7 ft 6 in (2.29 m) screws; Four 1,440 hp (1.1 MW) electric motors.; One 800 hp (600 kW) Vickers diesel generator for charging batteries on the surface.
- Speed: 24 knots (44 km/h; 28 mph) surfaced; 8 knots (15 km/h; 9.2 mph)
- Range: Surfaced: 800 nautical miles (1,500 km; 920 mi) at maximum speed; 12,500 nautical miles (23,200 km; 14,400 mi) at 10 knots (19 km/h; 12 mph); Submerged: 8 nautical miles (15 km; 9.2 mi) at 8 knots (15 km/h; 9.2 mph); 40 nautical miles (74 km; 46 mi) at 4 knots (7.4 km/h; 4.6 mph)
- Complement: 59 (6 officers and 53 ratings)
- Armament: 4 × 18 inch (450 mm) beam torpedo tubes; 4 × 18 in (450 mm) bow tubes, plus 8 spare torpedoes; 2 × 4 in (102 mm) guns; 1 × 3 in (76 mm) gun; 2 × 18 in (450 mm) deck tubes originally fitted, but later removed

HMS K13 was a steam-propelled First World War K class submarine of the Royal Navy. She sank in a fatal accident during sea trials in early 1917 and was salvaged and recommissioned as HMS K22.

== Design and construction ==
In early 1915, a requirement arose for a new type of fast submarines capable of operating with the Grand Fleet, which would operate ahead of the fleet in conjunction with the fleet's cruisers and attack an enemy force before the battleships would engage. The submarines would need a speed of at least 21 knots on the surface in the rough waters of the North Sea, with this being beyond the capability of conventional diesel-powered submarines. To meet this requirement, a 1913 design for a steam-powered submarine by the Admiralty's Director of Naval Construction was passed to Vickers for detailed design.

The submarines were 339 ft (103.33 m) long overall and 328 ft 6 in (100.13 m) between perpendiculars, with a beam of 26 ft 6 3/4 in (8.10 m) and a surfaced draught of 17 ft 0 in (5.18 m). Displacement was 1,980 long tons (2,010 t) on the surface and 2,566 long tons (2,607 t) submerged. Two Yarrow water-tube boilers fed steam at 235 psi (1,620 kPa) to two sets of Brown-Curtis impulse steam turbines rated at 10,500 shp (7,800 kW) which drove two propeller shafts. This gave a design speed on the surface of 24 kn (28 mph; 44 km/h). Submerged, the submarine was propelled by four electric motors rated at 1,440 bhp (1,070 kW) which gave a design speed of 9–9.5 kn (10.4–10.9 mph; 16.7–17.6 km/h) which corresponded to a sea speed of about 8 kn (9.2 mph; 15 km/h). An 800 bhp (600 kW) auxiliary diesel engine was fitted to power the submarine on the surface when the steam plant was unavailable (for example when the submarine had just surfaced and steam was being raised). This engine drove a dynamo which powered the electric motors or charged the batteries.

The steam engines required large openings in the pressure hull, with two funnels and four air intakes, which had to be closed off and made watertight before the submarine submerged. The funnels hinged into the submarine's superstructure and the openings by the funnels and air intakes sealed by electrically operated valves. The submarine had a range on the surface of 12,500 nmi (14,400 mi; 23,200 km) at 10 kn (12 mph; 19 km/h) (powered by the diesel engine) or 800 nmi (920 mi; 1,500 km) at full power. The submerged endurance was much less than expected, 8 nmi (9.2 mi; 15 km) at 8 kn (9.2 mph; 15 km/h) and 30 nmi (35 mi; 56 km) at 4 kn (4.6 mph; 7.4 km/h).

Ten 18 inch (450 mm) torpedo tubes were fitted, with four bow tubes, four beam tubes and two on a revolving mount on the superstructure, A total of 18 torpedoes were carried. Gun armament consisted of two 4 inch (102 mm) guns and one 3-inch (76 mm) anti-aircraft gun. Once in service, the ships proved to be very wet on the surface, with the bow tending to dig down, and one of the 4-inch guns and the revolving torpedo-tube mount was removed. The normal crew was 59 officers and other ranks.

K13 was one of 12 K-class submarines ordered in August 1915, following on from the first 2 ordered in June that year. She was laid down at Fairfield's Govan shipyard in October 1915 as Yard number 522, and was launched on 11 November 1916.

== Accident ==
On 29 January 1917, K13 was undergoing final pre-acceptance trials in the Gareloch, Dunbartonshire, Scotland. During a dive in the morning, a small leak had been reported in the boiler rooms, so a second dive was programmed for the afternoon. All boiler room vents were opened to clear the boiler room of steam to aid searching for the leaks. At about 3:00 pm, the submarine went to diving stations, and after confirming that the engine room had been shut off, the submarine was dived. She had 80 people on board - 53 crew, 14 employees of the shipbuilders, five sub-contractors, five Admiralty officials, Joseph Duncan, a River Clyde pilot, and Commander Francis Goodhart and engineering officer Lieutenant Leslie Rideal, both from her sister ship K14, which was still under construction.

As she dived, seawater was seen to be entering K13's engine room, and the submarine's commanding officer, Lieutenant-Commander Godfrey Herbert ordered watertight doors to be shut and ballast tanks to be blown to bring the submarine to the surface, and then the drop keels released. Despite this, the dive could not be stopped and the submarine was soon stuck fast on the bottom of the Gareloch. The crew of E50, another submarine undergoing trials on the Gareloch, watched K13 dive and became concerned that the dive did not "look right" and raised the alarm. Two men were seen on the surface by Annie MacIntyre, a maid in a hotel a mile or so away, but her report was ignored.

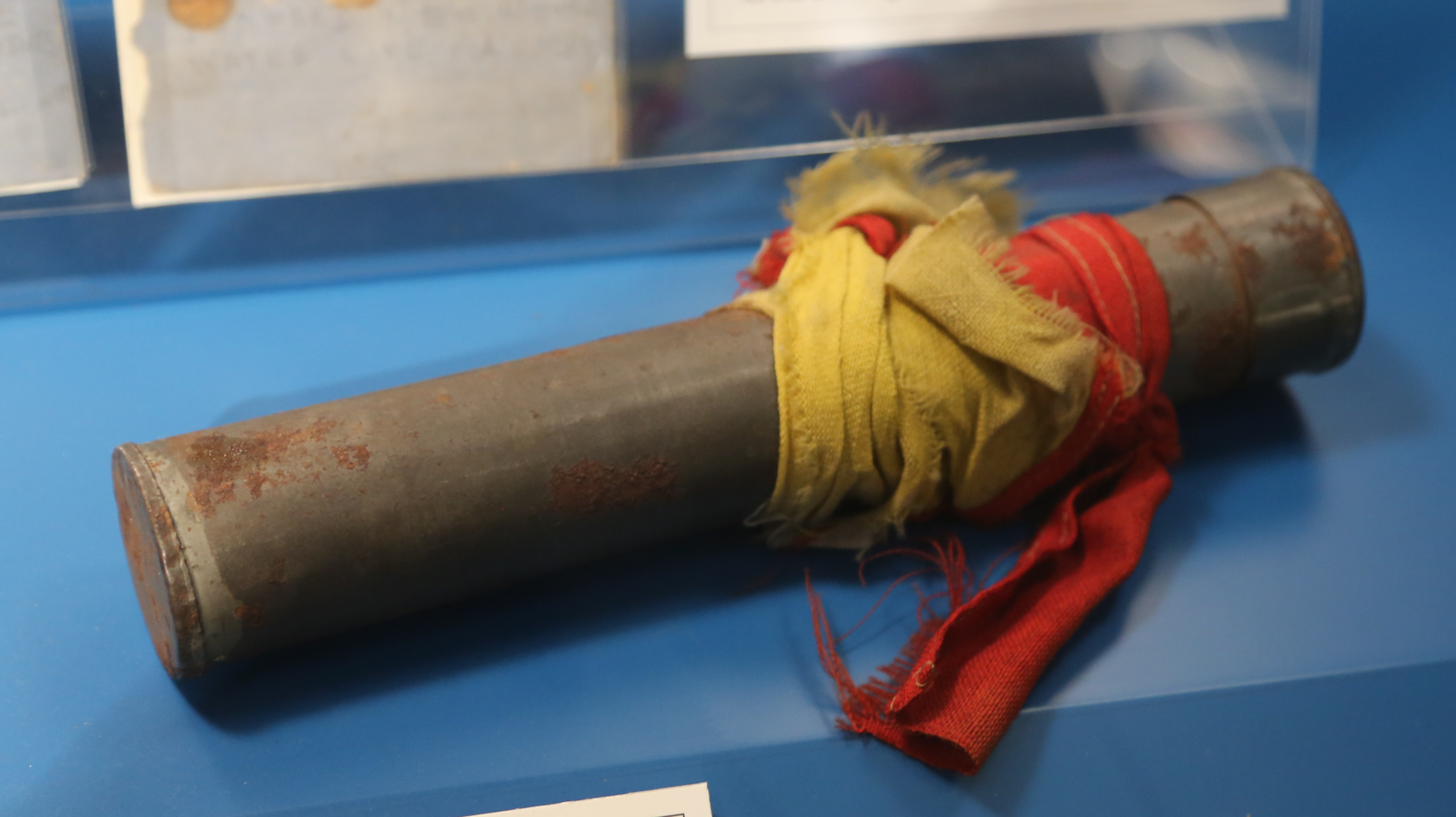
A message capsule sent up from the submarine

The first rescue vessel, the torpedo gunboat Gossamer, had started searching for K13 using grapples by 23:00. Attempts to send divers down were delayed since Gossamer had a diving-suit but no diver, and when a diver arrived from Fairfields, he was nearly drowned when the suit, which had not been used for years, burst. Despite the lack of proper escape apparatus, Herbert, and the commander of K14, Commander Goodhart, attempted an escape to the surface by using the space between the inner and outer hatches of the conning tower as an airlock. Herbert reached the surface alive, but Goodhart's body was later found trapped in the wheelhouse.

Once at the surface, Herbert was able to co-ordinate rescue efforts, and later that afternoon an airline was connected, which allowed the ballast tanks to be blown and by midday on 31 January the bows had been brought to just above the surface and supported by a barge on each side. A hole was cut through her pressure hull, and at 22:00 the final survivor was rescued from the submarine. 32 people died in the accident and 48 were rescued. 31 bodies were expected to be still on the submarine, but only 29 were found, and it was concluded that the maid had indeed seen two people escaping from the engine room. They were later identified as Engineer-Lieutenant Arthur Lane and Fairfield foreman John Steel. Lane's body was recovered from the Clyde two months later, Steel's body was never found.

At 6 p.m. the following day, K13 tore the bollards out of the barges and sank again, flooding through the hole. The submarine was finally salvaged on 15 March, repaired and recommissioned as HMS K22.

The court of enquiry found that four of the 37 inch (940 mm) diameter ventilators had been left open during the dive, and that the indicator lever in the control room had actually showed them as open. The engine room hatch was also found to be open.

== Subsequent service ==
K13 was raised on 15 March 1917, and was subsequently refurbished and entered service under the name K22, completing on 18 October 1917, joining the 13th Submarine Flotilla.

On the night of 31 January 1918, units of the Grand Fleet, including the 13th Submarine Flotilla (the flotilla leader Ithuriel and the submarines K11, K12, K14, K17 and K22) and the 12th Submarine Flotilla (the light cruiser Fearless and the submarines K3, K4, K6 and K7) set out from Rosyth to take part in exercises. Despite the night being very dark, with occasional patches of fog, the ships were running without lights. When K14 altered course to avoid a number of minesweepers ahead of her, her rudder jammed and she was rammed by K22. The two disabled submarines were then overtaken by the heavier units of the fleet, and K22 was struck by the battlecruiser Inflexible, destroying the external ballast tanks on K22's starboard side. Despite the damage, both submarines remained afloat, with K22 making her way back to port under her own power. On hearing distress signals from the two submarines, Commander E. Leir aboard Ithuriel decided to turn the Flotilla back to go to the assistance of K14 and K22. This put the flotilla on a collision course with the rest of the fleet, including the 12th Submarine Flotilla. On meeting the fleet, Ithuriel had to turn to avoid the battlecruiser Australia, which took the flotilla directly into the path of the 12th Flotilla. Fearless collided with K17, which sank, then K4, following Fearless, pulled out of line and stopped to avoid hitting K17 and Fearless, and was herself hit by K6, which cut K4 in two, and K7. Two submarines had been sunk with 103 killed.

K22 remained part of the 13th Flotilla at the end of the war, and by March 1919 was part of the 3rd Submarine Flotilla. She was sold for scrap on 16 December 1926.

== Memorials ==
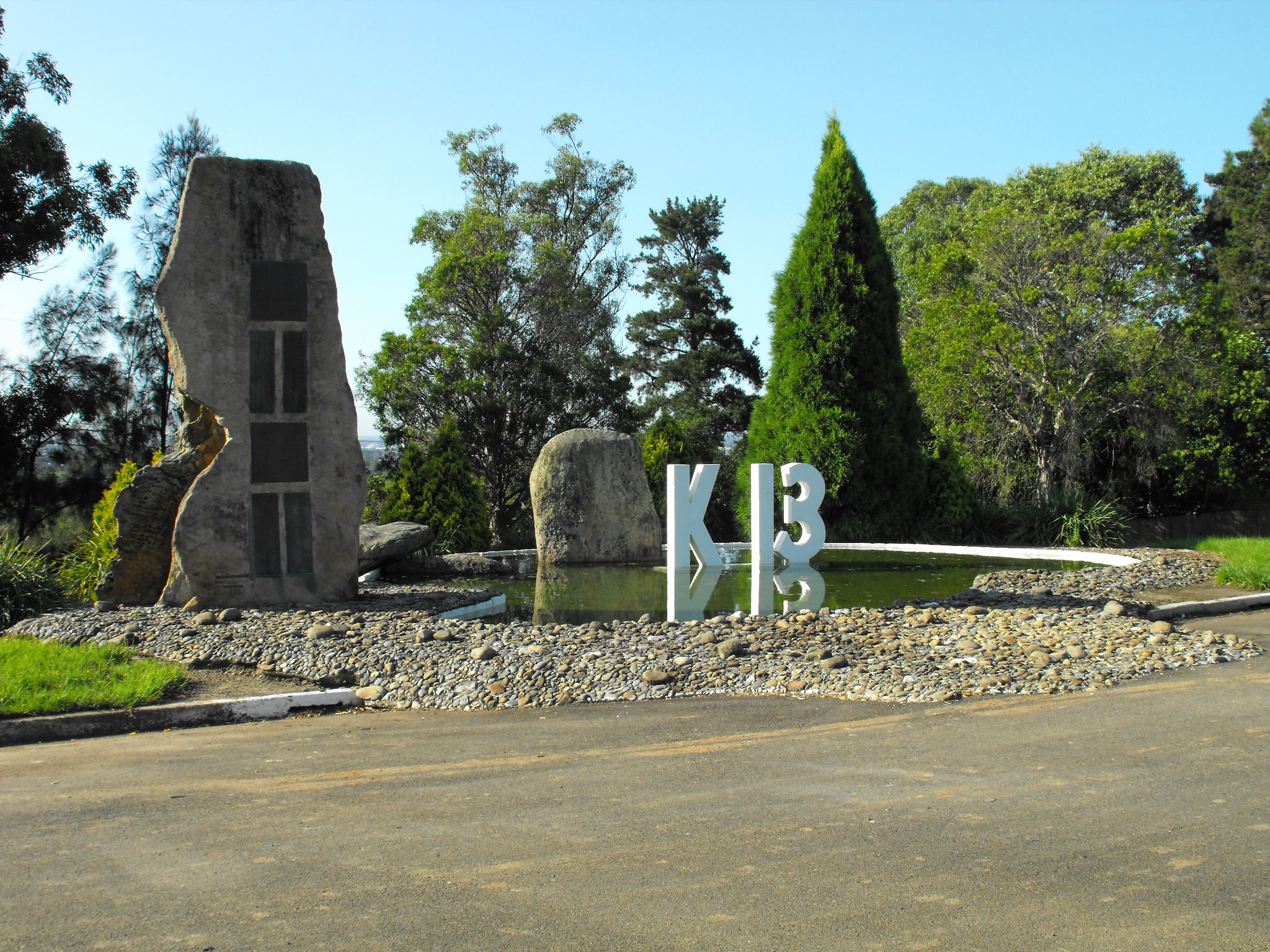
The K13 Memorial at Carlingford, New South Wales

The war graves and a monument to those who lost their lives in the K13 sinking was erected by the ship's company, of the submarine depot at Fort Blockhouse, Gosport. It is to be found at the entrance to Faslane Cemetery, at the head of the Gare Loch.

A memorial to the disaster was erected in Carlingford, New South Wales, Australia, paid for by the widow of Charles Freestone, a leading telegraphist on K13 who survived the accident to later emigrate and prosper in Australia. The memorial was unveiled on 10 September 1961 and has the inscription "This memorial has been created in memory of those officers and men of the Commonwealth who gave their lives in submarines while serving the cause of freedom." Set inside a pool of water surrounded by stone, it is composed of large (taller than a man) white letters saying "K13". There is a further memorial in Elder Park, Govan, opposite the Fairfield shipyard.
