= Active-class cruiser =

Class of British cruisers

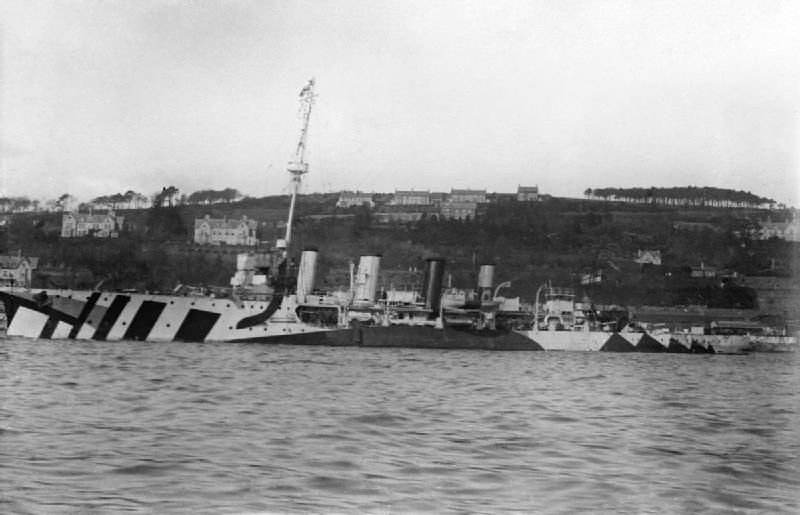
- Active in dazzle camouflage

Class overview
- Name: Active
- Builders: Pembroke Royal Dockyard
- Operators: Royal Navy
- Preceded by: Blonde class
- Succeeded by: None
- Built: 1910–1913
- In commission: 1911–1920
- Completed: 3
- Lost: 1
- Scrapped: 2

General characteristics (as built)
- Type: Scout cruiser
- Displacement: 3,340 long tons (3,390 t) (normal)
- Length: 405 ft (123.4 m) (o/a)
- Beam: 41 ft (12.5 m)
- Draught: 14 ft 6 in (4.4 m)
- Installed power: 18,000 shp (13,000 kW); 12 × Yarrow boilers
- Propulsion: 4 × shafts; 2 × Parsons steam turbine sets
- Speed: 25 knots (46 km/h; 29 mph)
- Range: 4,630 nmi (8,570 km; 5,330 mi) at 10 knots (19 km/h; 12 mph)
- Complement: 293
- Armament: 10 × single 4 in (102 mm) guns; 4 × single 3-pdr (47 mm (1.9 in)) guns; 2 × 18 in (450 mm) torpedo tubes
- Armour: Deck: .5–1 in (13–25 mm); Conning tower: 4 in (102 mm)

The Active-class cruisers were a trio of scout cruisers built for the Royal Navy shortly before the First World War. They were initially assigned to the First Fleet and became destroyer flotilla leaders in 1914. Amphion and Fearless and their flotillas were assigned to the Harwich Force when the war began in August 1914. They went out on a patrol on the first day of the war and Amphion and her destroyers encountered and sank a German minelayer. On the voyage home, the cruiser struck a mine laid by the German ship and sank. She was the first ship of the Royal Navy to be sunk in the war.

Fearless went out on the same patrol, but encountered nothing. She participated in the Battle of Heligoland Bight and the Cuxhaven Raid later that year. The ship and her destroyers were transferred to the Grand Fleet in early 1915. Active, on the other hand, remained with the Grand Fleet and both ships played minor roles in the Battle of Jutland the following year. After the battle, Fearless was converted into a submarine depot ship and rejoined the Grand Fleet in 1917 as the leader of a submarine flotilla. A year later, she accidentally rammed and sank one submarine as part of an incident that sardonically came to be known as the Battle of May Island.

Shortly after Jutland, Active again became a destroyer leader and escorted the main body of the Grand Fleet during the action of 19 August 1916. By the end of the year, the ship was assigned to the Dover Patrol and was present during two battles with German destroyers, but was not engaged in either. She was transferred to the Mediterranean Fleet in 1918 and was based in Gibraltar for the rest of the war. The sister ships were both sold for scrap in 1920–21.

== Design and description ==
They were the last class of scout cruisers built for the Royal Navy as they were too slow to lead destroyers in battle or to defend the fleet against enemy destroyer attacks. The Active class was a slightly improved version of the previous Blonde class scouts, with the main visible difference being the new 'plough' bow changed to improve their seakeeping abilities. Two of the three were ordered under the 1910–1911 Naval Programme and the last in the following naval programme.

Displacing 3,340 long tons (3,390 t), the ships had an overall length of 405 feet (123.4 m), a beam of 41 feet (12.5 m) and a deep draught of 14 feet 6 inches (4.4 m). They were powered by two sets of Parsons steam turbines, each driving two shafts. The turbines produced a total of 18,000 indicated horsepower (13,000 kW), using steam produced by 12 Yarrow boilers that burned both fuel oil and coal, and gave a maximum speed of 25 knots (46 km/h; 29 mph). They carried a maximum of 855 long tons (869 t) of coal and 200 long tons (203 t) of fuel oil that gave them a range of 4,630 nautical miles (8,570 km; 5,330 mi) at 10 knots (19 km/h; 12 mph). Their crew consisted of 293 officers and ratings.

The main armament of the Active class consisted of ten breech-loading (BL) four-inch Mk VII guns. The forward pair of guns were mounted side by side on a platform on the forecastle, six were amidships, three on each broadside, and the two remaining guns were on the centreline of the quarterdeck, one ahead of the other. The guns fired their 31-pound (14 kg) shells to a range of about 11,400 yards (10,400 m). Their secondary armament was four quick-firing (QF) three-pounder 47-millimetre (1.9 in) Vickers Mk I guns and two submerged 18-inch (450 mm) torpedo tubes. In 1918, two 4-inch guns were removed from Active and Fearless. A QF three-inch 20 cwt (Note: "Cwt" is the abbreviation for hundredweight, 20 cwt referring to the weight of the gun.) anti-aircraft gun was added to Active in 1916; Fearless receiving her own two years later.

As scout cruisers, the ships were only lightly protected to maximise their speed. They had a curved protective deck that was one inch (25 mm) thick on the slope and 0.5 inches (13 mm) on the flat. Their conning tower was protected by four inches of armour.

== Ships ==
Construction data
| Ship | Builder | Laid down | Launched | Completed | Fate |
|---|---|---|---|---|---|
| HMS Active | Pembroke Royal Dockyard | 27 October 1910 | 14 March 1911 | December 1911 | Sold for scrap, 21 April 1920 |
| HMS Amphion | Pembroke Royal Dockyard | 15 March 1911 | 4 December 1911 | March 1913 | Sunk by naval mine, 6 August 1914 |
| HMS Fearless | Pembroke Royal Dockyard | 15 November 1911 | 12 June 1912 | October 1913 | Sold for scrap, 8 November 1921 |

== Service ==
All three ships were initially assigned to various squadrons in the First Fleet and then became flotilla leaders in mid-1914. When the war began in August, Amphion and Fearless and their flotillas (the 3rd and 1st Destroyer Flotillas (DF), respectively) were part of the Harwich Force. The morning after Britain joined the war, the force sortied on a patrol to the Dutch coast. The 3rd DF encountered and sank a German minelayer, SMS Königin Luise, but not before she had laid many of her mines. While returning home the following morning, Amphion accidentally struck a mine on 6 August off the Thames Estuary and sank with the loss of 132 crewmen killed. She was the first ship of the Royal Navy to be sunk in the First World War. The wreck site is protected and may not be dived upon without permission from the Ministry of Defence.

Fearless and the 1st DF saw nothing during that same patrol. She damaged two German light cruisers during the Battle of Heligoland Bight later in August. The squadron provided close cover for the seaplane carriers of the Harwich Force during the Cuxhaven Raid in late December, but the cruiser was only engaged by several Zeppelins and aircraft without effect. The ship was transferred to the Grand Fleet in early 1915 and played a minor role in the Battle of Jutland the following year.

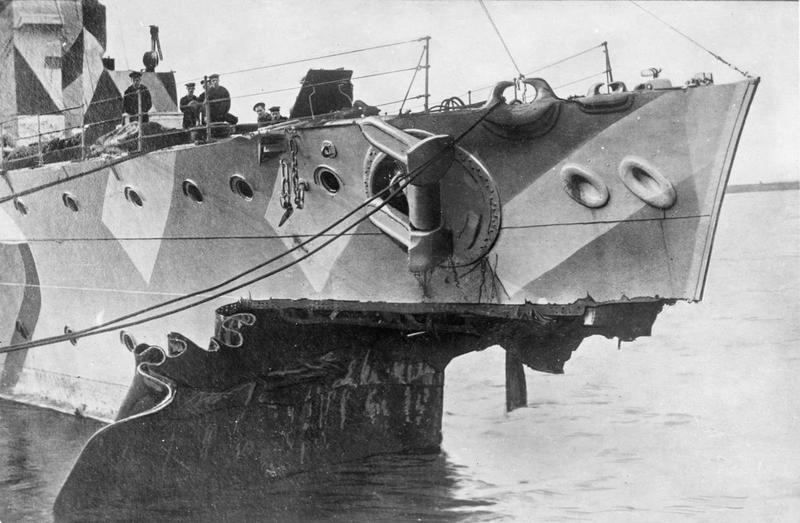
A closeup of the damage to Fearless's bow after the collision

She was converted into a submarine depot ship shortly afterwards and briefly deployed to Russia later in the year. Fearless later became the leader of the 12th Submarine Flotilla, initially based in Scapa Flow, but later in Rosyth. On 31 January 1918, she accidentally rammed and sank the submarine HMS K17 at night in poor visibility as part of an incident that sardonically came to be known as the Battle of May Island. The ship was repaired and was sold for scrap in November 1921.

Unlike her sisters, Active with her 2nd Destroyer Flotilla were assigned to the Grand Fleet at the beginning of the war, where their primary task was to protect the fleet from submarines. By the beginning of 1916, the cruiser was relieved of her assignment with the 2nd DF and she was on detached service with the Grand Fleet in January. Active also played a minor role in the Battle of Jutland later in the year. Shortly afterwards, she was briefly assigned as the flotilla leader of the 4th Destroyer Flotilla and escorted the main body of the Grand Fleet during the action of 19 August. By the end of the year, the ship was assigned to the Dover Patrol and was present during two battles with German destroyers, but was not engaged in either. Active was based in Gibraltar from April 1918 as part of the Mediterranean Fleet. The ship was reduced to reserve by 1 February 1919 and was sold for scrap on 21 April 1920.

== Bibliography ==
- Campbell, N. J. M. (1986). Jutland: An Analysis of the Fighting. Annapolis, Maryland: Naval Institute Press. ISBN 0-87021-324-5.
- Corbett, Julian. Naval Operations to the Battle of the Falklands. History of the Great War: Based on Official Documents. Vol. I (2nd, reprint of the 1938 ed.). London and Nashville, Tennessee: Imperial War Museum and Battery Press. ISBN 0-89839-256-X.
- Friedman, Norman (2009). British Destroyers From Earliest Days to the Second World War. Annapolis, Maryland: Naval Institute Press. ISBN 978-1-59114-081-8.
- Friedman, Norman (2011). Naval Weapons of World War One. Barnsley, South Yorkshire, UK: Seaforth. ISBN 978-1-84832-100-7.
- Gardiner, Robert & Gray, Randal, eds. (1985). Conway's All the World's Fighting Ships 1906–1921. Annapolis, Maryland: Naval Institute Press. ISBN 0-85177-245-5.
- Goldrick, James (2015). Before Jutland: The Naval War in Northern European Waters, August 1914–February 1915. Annapolis, Maryland: Naval Institute Press. ISBN 978-1-59114-349-9.
- Jellicoe, John (1919). The Grand Fleet, 1914–1916: Its Creation, Development, and Work. New York: George H. Doran. OCLC 13614571.
- Nash, N.S. (2009). K Boat Catastrophe: Eight Ships and Five Collisions: The Full Story of the 'Battle of the Isle of May'. Barnsley, UK: Pen & Sword Maritime. ISBN 9781844159840.
- Newbolt, Henry (1996). Naval Operations. History of the Great War Based on Official Documents. Vol. IV (reprint of the 1928 ed.). Nashville, Tennessee: Battery Press. ISBN 0-89839-253-5.
- Phillips, Lawrie (2014). Pembroke Dockyard and the Old Navy: A Bicentennial History. Stroud, Gloucestershire, UK: The History Press. ISBN 978-0-7509-5214-9.
- Tarrant, V. E. (1999). Jutland: The German Perspective: A New View of the Great Battle, 31 May 1916 (reprint of the 1995 ed.). London: Brockhampton Press. ISBN 1-86019-917-8.
- "Transcript: HMS FEARLESS – April 1916 to August 1917, British waters, Battle of Jutland, Russian Waters, UK Home". Royal Navy Log Books of the World War 1 Era. Naval-History.net.
