= HMS Havock =

Six vessels of the Royal Navy have been named HMS Havock, including:

- HMS Havock (1805) was a 12-gun gun-brig launched in 1805. She became a lightvessel in 1821, a watch vessel in 1834 and was broken up in 1859.
- HMS Havock (1855) was a mortar vessel launched in 1855, and renamed MV5 later that year. She became a customs watch vessel designated WV27, and was broken up in 1874.
- HMS Havock (1856) was an Albacore-class wooden screw gunboat launched in 1856 and sold in 1870.
- HMS Havock (1893) was a Havock-class destroyer launched in 1893, becoming the first design of torpedo boat destroyers in the Navy. She was broken up in 1912.
- HMS Havock was to have been a Laforey-class destroyer, but was renamed HMS Linnet before being launched in 1913.
- HMS Havock (H43) was an H-class destroyer launched in 1936 and wrecked in 1942 off Kelibia.

== See also ==
- HMS Havick
