= Active class =

"Active class" may refer to:

- Active-class frigate, a class of eight fifth-rate frigates operated by the British Royal Navy from 1780 to 1830
- Active-class schooner, a class of six schooners operated by the United States Revenue Cutter Service from 1867 to 1874
- Active-class cruiser, a class of three scout cruisers operated by the British Royal Navy from 1911 to 1920
- Active-class patrol boat, a class of 32 patrol boats operated by the United States Coast Guard from 1927 to 1978
