= Battle of May Island =

British friendly-fire naval disaster

Coordinates: 56°11′9″N 2°33′27″W

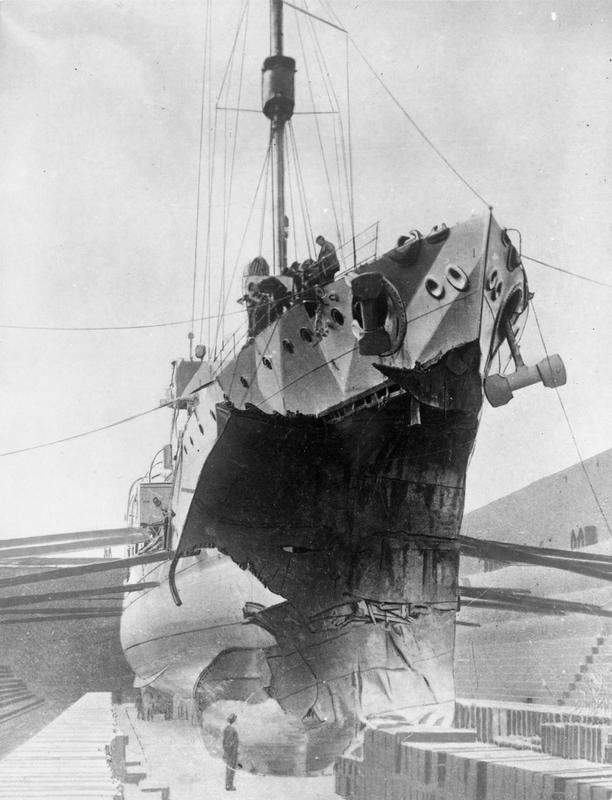
- The bow of the drydocked cruiser HMS Fearless after colliding with the submarine K17
- Date: 31 January – 1 February 1918
- Location: Waters off the Isle of May
- Also known as: Operation E.C.1
- Type: Naval accident
- Cause: Human Error, Weather, Mechanical Failure
- Participants: Royal Navy
- Outcome: Total deaths: 105; 2 subs sunk; 4 subs damaged; 1 Scout cruiser damaged
- Deaths: K4 with 55 dead; K17 with 48 dead; K14 with 2 dead
- Property damage: HMS K4 sunk; HMS K17 sunk; HMS K6 damaged; HMS K7 damaged; HMS K14 damaged; HMS K22 damaged; HMS Fearless damaged

The Battle of May Island is the name given to the series of accidents that occurred during Operation E.C.1 in 1918. Named after the Isle of May, a nearby island in the Firth of Forth, the "battle" consisted of a disastrous series of accidents amongst Royal Navy vessels on their way from Rosyth, Scotland, to fleet exercises in the North Sea. On the misty night of 31 January–1 February 1918, five collisions occurred between eight vessels. Two K-class submarines were lost and four other submarines and a scout cruiser were damaged. 105 British sailors in total died in the accidents.

== Nomenclature ==
The use of Battle for the events is an example of black humour. Although it took place during the First World War, no enemy forces were present and the losses were entirely accidental.

== Operation E.C.1 ==
On the afternoon of 31 January 1918, around forty naval vessels left Rosyth on the Firth of Forth, Scotland, bound for Scapa Flow in Orkney where exercises involving the entire Grand Fleet would take place the following day. The vessels included the 5th Battle Squadron of three battleships with their destroyer escorts, the 2nd Battlecruiser Squadron of four battlecruisers and their destroyers, two cruisers and two flotillas of K-class submarines each led by a surface warship. The K-class submarines, specially designed to operate with a battle fleet, were large boats for their time, at 339 feet (103 m) long. The submarines were powered by steam turbines to allow them to travel at 24 knots on the surface to keep up with their fleet.

The two flotillas were the 12th Submarine Flotilla, consisting of K3, K4, K6 and K7, led by Captain Charles Little in the light cruiser HMS Fearless, and the 13th Submarine Flotilla, consisting of K11, K12, K14, K17 and K22, led by Commander Ernest William Leir in the destroyer HMS Ithuriel. Vice Admiral Beatty had moved the 12th and 13th flotillas of K-class submarines in December 1917 from Scapa Flow to Rosyth in order to ensure that they were in a better strategic location from which to undertake operations.

== Timeline ==
At 18:30 hours the vessels weighed anchor, and the entire fleet under the command of Vice Admiral Sir Hugh Evan-Thomas in the battlecruiser HMS Courageous steamed in a single line nearly 30 miles (48 km) long. At the head of the line was the Courageous, followed by Ithuriel leading the rest of the 13th Submarine Flotilla. Several miles behind them was the battlecruiser squadron containing HMAS Australia, HMS New Zealand, Indomitable and Inflexible with their destroyers. After these came the 12th Submarine Flotilla and bringing up the rear were three battleships, which were accompanied by a number of screening destroyers. The initial speed was 16 knots, but Evan-Thomas had ordered his forces to increase speed to 22 knots when they passed the Isle of May, which lay just at the entrance to the Forth estuary.

All vessels were ordered to sail astern of each other, 400 yards (370 m) apart. To avoid attracting German U-boats, particularly as one was suspected to be in the area, after dark each vessel showed only a dim blue stern light accompanied by black-out shields that restricted the lights to one compass point either side of the boats' centre line, and they also were all instructed to maintain radio silence.

The night was clear and the seas relatively calm, but the moon had not yet come up. As each group passed the Isle of May at the mouth of the firth, they altered course and increased speed to 20 knots.

At approximately 19:00 hours, Courageous passed the Isle of May and increased speed, just as a low-lying bank of mist settled over the sea. As the 13th Submarine Flotilla passed the island, a pair of lights (possibly minesweeping naval trawlers) were seen approaching the line of submarines. The flotilla altered course sharply to port to avoid them, but the helm of the third-in-line K14 jammed for six minutes and she veered out of line. Both K14 and the boat behind her, K12 turned on their navigation lights. Eventually K14's helm was freed and she tried to return to her position in the line. The next submarine in line, K22, had lost sight of the rest of the flotilla in the mist and veered off the line, with the result that she hit K14 at 19:17 hours, severing the bow and breaching the forward mess deck, where two men were killed. Both stricken submarines stopped and carefully pulled themselves apart whilst the rest of the flotilla, unaware of what had happened, continued out to sea.

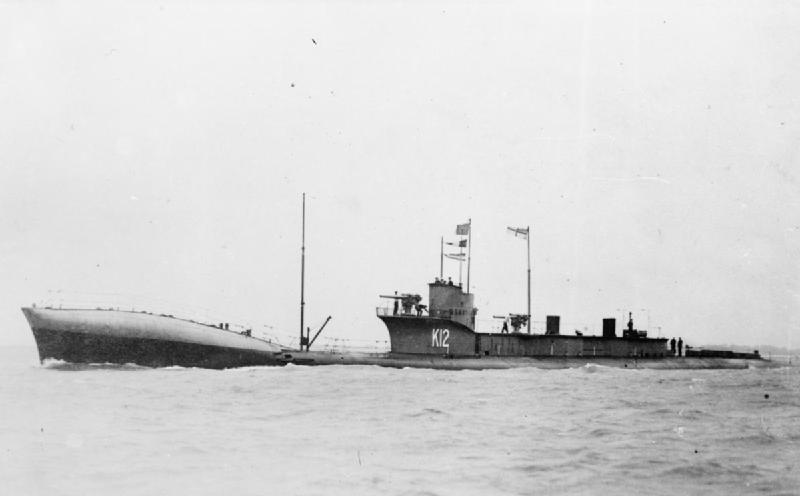
HMS K12 in 1924

K22 radioed in code to the cruiser leading the flotilla to say that she could reach port but that K14 was crippled and sinking.

About fifteen minutes later, the 2nd Battlecruiser Squadron passed the island and the two submarines. The captain of K22 ordered the firing of a red Very light, which ensured three of the four battlecruisers were able to avoid both submarines. However, the battlecruiser Inflexible bringing up the rear struck K22 a glancing blow at 19:43 hours before continuing on her way. The impact bent the first 30 feet (9.1 m) of the bow of K22 at right angles and wrecked the ballast and fuel tanks, and she settled by the bow until only the conning tower showed.

Meanwhile, Leir, captain of Ithuriel, had received and decoded the message about the first collision between the two submarines and turned back to help them. Leir sent an encoded message to the flag officer on Australia at 20:40 hours, warning them of what was happening. "Submarines K-12 and K-22 have been in collision and are holed forward. I am proceeding to their assistance with 13th Submarine Flotilla. Position 18 miles east magnetic from May Island".

This could have made a difference and prevented the loss of at least some of those in the water, except that the primitive technology of the time meant that transmission was delayed until 21:20. The submarines behind Ithuriel turned to follow her, and the flotilla headed back towards the 2nd Battlecruiser Squadron, which then passed through the flotilla. It was only through emergency turns by both groups of vessels that further accidents were narrowly avoided.

Upon hearing the sirens from Fearless which signalled that she had stopped, K4 also came to a stop, but the trailing boats did not. K3 narrowly missed K4 and then stopped three cables further on, but K6, despite going full astern, could not avoid a collision, ramming the broadside of K4 and nearly cutting the latter in half. The seriously damaged K4 sank with all of her crew; while going down, she was hit by K7.

As the 13th Flotilla reached the Isle of May, they encountered the outbound 12th Submarine Flotilla. Fearless, the leader of the 12th Flotilla, was moving at full speed, and rammed the K17, damaging Fearless' bow, and sinking the K17 in eight minutes.

At this point the 5th Battle Squadron of three battleships and their destroyers passed through the area, unaware of what had happened, with some of the destroyers cutting down the survivors of K17 struggling in the water. Only nine of the 56 men originally on board the submarine survived, and one of these died of his injuries shortly afterwards. A total of 48 men from K17's crew were lost.

Within 75 minutes, two submarines had sunk, three had been badly damaged, and 105 men had been killed.

K14 was taken in tow by HMS Venetia and reached port.

== Aftermath ==
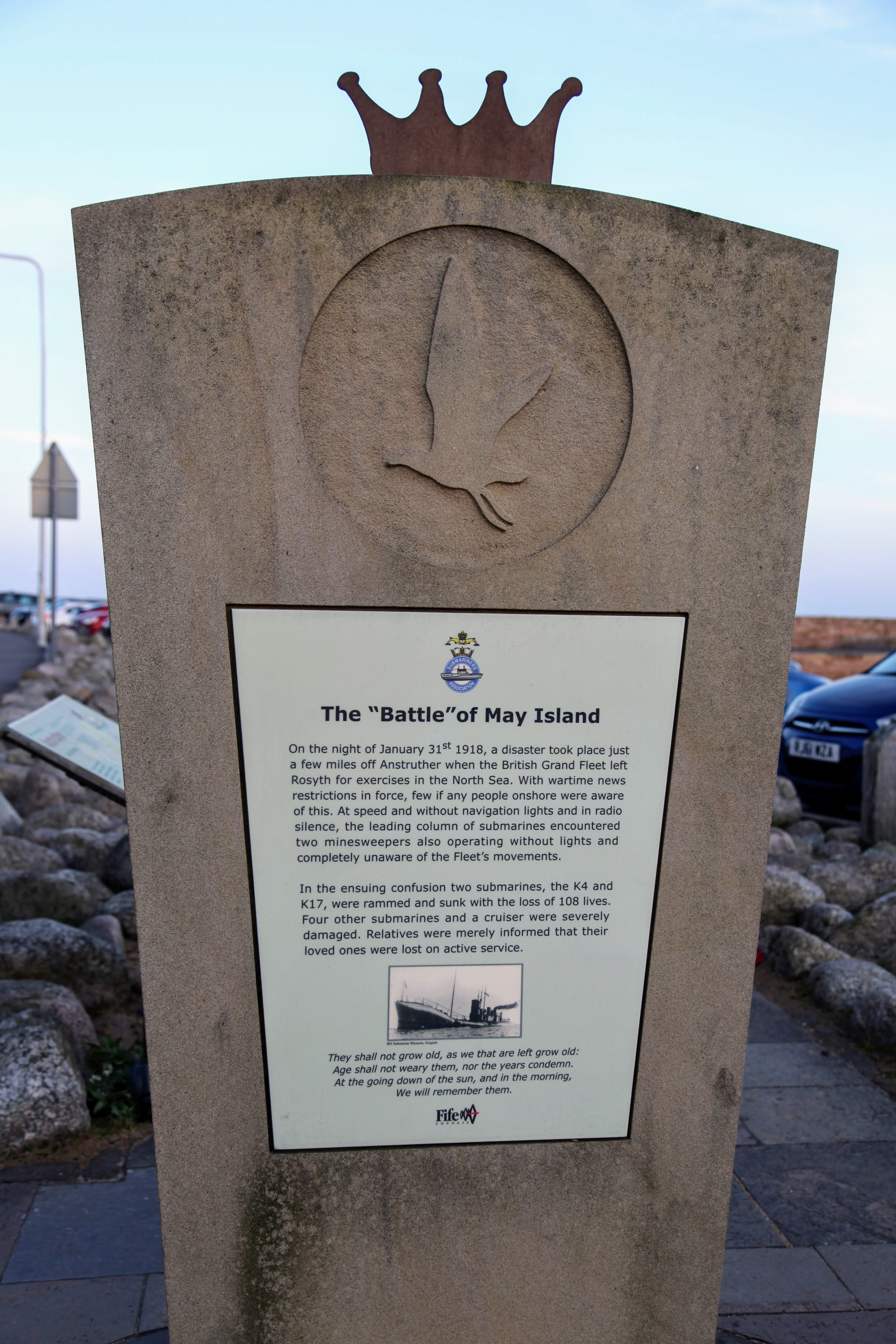
The memorial to the battle, Anstruther

A total of 104 lives were lost during the "Battle of May Island": 55 from K4, 47 from K17, and two from K14.

The subsequent hastily convened Court of Inquiry began on 5 February 1918 and sat for five days. The Court of Inquiry released its final report on 19 February 1918, in which it placed the blame for the incident on Leir and four officers on the K boats. They recommended that Leir be court martialled. The case of negligence against Leir for the loss of K-17 was "not proved". Both the investigation and court martial were kept quiet, with much of the information not released until 1994.

A memorial cairn was erected 84 years later, on 31 January 2002, at Anstruther harbour opposite the Isle of May. The Submariners' Association holds an annual commemorative service to honour the loss of life.

== Wrecks ==
In 2011, surveyors conducting a detailed preparatory survey of the sea floor for the Neart Na Gaoithe offshore wind farm published sonar images of the wrecks of the two submarines, K-4 and K-17, sunk during the accident. The site of the two sunken submarines, 100 metres apart and about 50 metres down, has long been known, but the wrecks have now been officially surveyed by divers from the specialist marine consultants EMU.

== See also ==
- Battle of Barking Creek, a 1939 friendly-fire aviation incident
- Honda Point disaster, a 1923 incident involving United States destroyers
- Operation Wikinger, a friendly-fire incident involving the Luftwaffe and Kriegsmarine in 1940
