= HMS Active (1911) =

Active-class scout cruiser

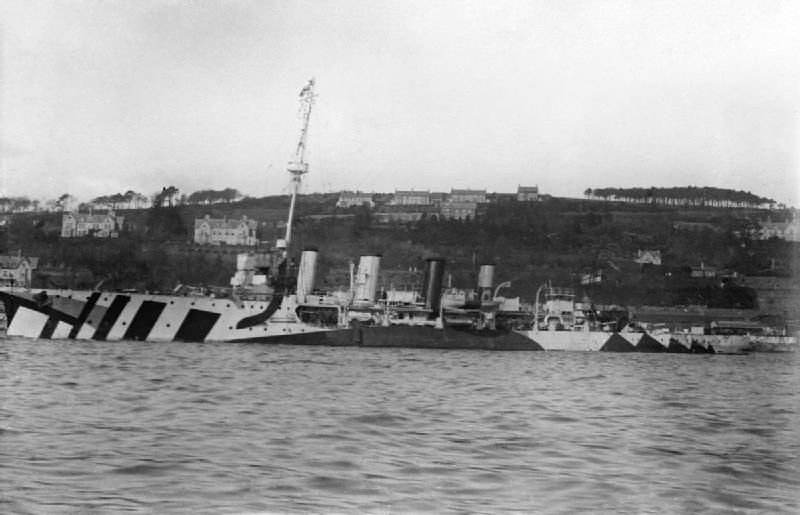
- Active at anchor in dazzle camouflage

History

United Kingdom
- Name: HMS Active
- Builder: Pembroke Royal Dockyard
- Laid down: 27 July 1910
- Launched: 14 March 1911
- Commissioned: December 1911
- Fate: Sold for scrap, 21 April 1920

General characteristics (as built)
- Class & type: Active-class scout cruiser
- Displacement: 3,340 long tons (3,390 t) (normal)
- Length: 405 ft (123.4 m) (o/a)
- Beam: 41 ft (12.5 m)
- Draught: 14 ft 6 in (4.4 m)
- Installed power: 18,000 shp (13,000 kW); 12 × Yarrow boilers
- Propulsion: 4 × shafts; 2 × Parsons steam turbine sets
- Speed: 25 knots (46 km/h; 29 mph)
- Range: 4,630 nautical miles (8,570 km; 5,330 mi) at 10 knots (19 km/h; 12 mph)
- Complement: 293
- Armament: 10 × single BL 4-inch (102 mm) guns; 4 × single QF 3-pounder 47 mm (1.9 in) guns; 2 × single 18-inch (450 mm) torpedo tubes
- Armour: Deck: 0.5–1 in (13–25 mm); Conning Tower: 4 in (102 mm)

HMS Active was the name ship of her class of three scout cruisers built for the Royal Navy in the 1910s. Completed in 1911, she was briefly assigned to several different units until the ship became the flotilla leader of the 2nd Destroyer Flotilla (DF) in 1914. When the First World War began in August of that year, the 2nd DF was assigned to the Grand Fleet where their primary task was to protect the fleet from submarines.

By the beginning of 1916, Active was assigned to the Grand Fleet and played a minor role in the Battle of Jutland later in the year. Shortly afterwards, she was briefly assigned as the flotilla leader of the 4th Destroyer Flotilla and escorted the main body of the Grand Fleet during the action of 19 August. By the end of the year, the ship was assigned to the Dover Patrol and was present during two battles with German destroyers, but was not engaged in either. Active was based in Ireland by the beginning of 1918, but was soon transferred to the Mediterranean Fleet and based in Gibraltar for the rest of the war. The ship was reduced to reserve in 1919 and was sold for scrap the following year.

== Design and description ==
The Active-class ships were the last class of turbine-powered scout cruisers ordered by the Admiralty. These ships were intended to work with destroyer flotillas, leading their torpedo attacks and backing them up when attacked by other destroyers, although they quickly became less useful as destroyer speeds increased before the First World War. Active had a length between perpendiculars of 405 feet (123.4 m), a beam of 41 feet (12.5 m) and a draught of 14 feet 6 inches (4.4 m). She displaced 3,340 long tons (3,394 t) at normal load and 3,945 long tons (4,008 t) at deep load. Her crew consisted of 289 officers and other ranks.

The main armament of the Active class consisted of ten breech-loading (BL) four-inch Mk VII guns. The forward pair of guns were mounted side by side on a platform on the forecastle, six were amidships, three on each broadside, and the two remaining guns were on the centreline of the quarterdeck, one ahead of the other. The guns fired their 31-pound (14 kg) shells to a range of about 11,400 yards (10,400 m). Her secondary armament was four quick-firing (QF) three-pounder 47 mm (1.9 in) Vickers Mk I guns and two submerged 18-inch (450 mm) torpedo tubes. In 1918, two 4-inch guns were removed from Active and Fearless. A QF three-inch 20 cwt (Note: "Cwt" is the abbreviation for hundredweight, 20 cwt referring to the weight of the gun.) anti-aircraft gun was added to Active in 1916.

As scout cruisers, the ships were only lightly protected to maximise their speed. They had a curved protective deck that was one inch (25 mm) thick on the slope and 0.5 inches (13 mm) on the flat. Their conning tower was protected by four inches of armour.

== Construction and career ==
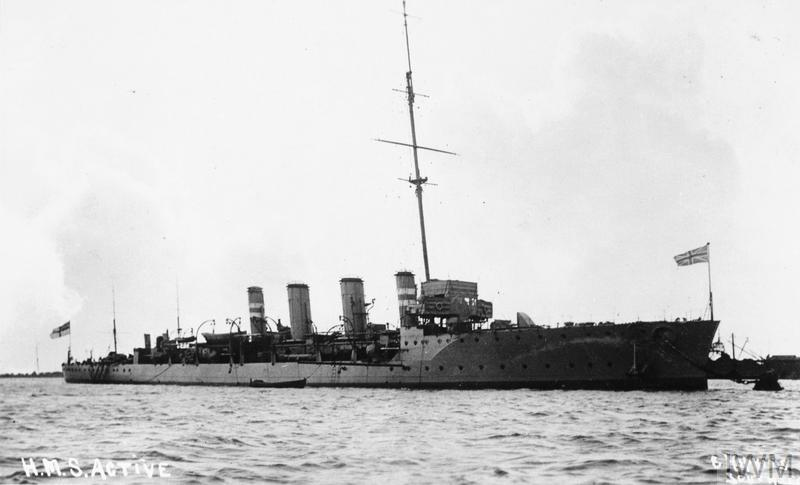
Active at anchor, 1912

Ordered as part of the 1910 Naval Programme, Active was the tenth ship of her name to serve in the Royal Navy. She was laid down at Pembroke Dockyard's No. 5 Slipway on 27 July 1910 by Mrs. Mundy, wife of the dockyard's Captain-Superintendent, Captain Geoffrey Mundy and launched on 14 March 1911 by Lady Herbert, wife of Major-general Ivor Herbert, MP. Completed in December 1911, the ship was assigned to the 4th Battle Squadron of the First Fleet by 18 February 1913, but had been transferred to the 1st Light Cruiser Squadron as of 18 June. She remained with the squadron for less than a year and was serving as the flotilla leader of the 2nd Destroyer Flotilla by 18 March 1914.

At the beginning of World War I in August, Active and her flotilla were assigned to the Grand Fleet. On 1 September, a submarine was spotted inside Scapa Flow and the 2nd DF was detailed to hunt down the imaginary submarine while the rest of the Grand Fleet put to sea. When not escorting the capital ships of the Grand Fleet, the flotilla spent much time on anti-submarine patrol off the entrances to Scapa Flow. In mid-October, multiple reports of submarines in the Minch caused Admiral Sir John Jellicoe, commander of the Grand Fleet, to send Active and some of her destroyers there to hunt them down, but nothing was found. After their search was concluded, they joined a large part of the Grand Fleet at Lough Swilly, Ireland, on 22 October. Sometime between October 1915 and January 1916, the cruiser was relieved of her assignment with the 2nd DF and she was on detached service with the Grand Fleet in January.

By May, Active was attached to the Grand Fleet flagship, Iron Duke. She played a minor role in the Battle of Jutland on 31 May–1 June as she was ordered to screen the left flank of the Grand Fleet as it approached the High Seas Fleet. After Jellicoe ordered the Fleet to deploy to port just before it encountered the German fleet, that placed her behind the battleships, unable to engage any German ships. She only fired eight 4-inch rounds during the entire battle.

Shortly afterwards, Active was assigned as the leader of the 4th DF, based at Immingham in the Humber. On the evening of 18 August, the Grand Fleet put to sea in response to a message deciphered by Room 40 that indicated that the High Seas Fleet would be leaving harbour that night. The German objective was to bombard Sunderland the following day, based on extensive reconnaissance conducted by Zeppelins and submarines. Active and eight of her destroyers were summoned to rendezvous with the main body of the Grand Fleet and met up with them the following afternoon, but they did not encounter the High Seas Fleet. The cruiser did not remain there long and was assigned to the 6th Destroyer Flotilla of the Dover Patrol by January 1917. Active was present, but was not engaged, when German destroyers attacked the Dover Patrol on the nights of 25/25 February and 20/21 April.

By January 1918 she was at Queenstown as the flagship of the Southern Division of the Coast of Ireland Station. Several months later, she deployed to the Mediterranean and was based in Gibraltar by April. She survived the war and was still in Gibraltar on 1 December 1918, although the ship was in reserve at Devonport by 1 February 1919. Active was sold for scrap on 21 April 1920.

== Bibliography ==
- Campbell, N. J. M. (1986). Jutland: An Analysis of the Fighting. Annapolis, Maryland: Naval Institute Press. ISBN 978-0-87021-324-3.
- Colledge, J. J.; Warlow, Ben (2006) [1969]. Ships of the Royal Navy: The Complete Record of All Fighting Ships of the Royal Navy from the 15th Century to the Present (3rd Rev ed.). London: Chatham Publishing. ISBN 978-1-86176-281-8. OCLC 67375475.
- Friedman, Norman (2009). British Destroyers From Earliest Days to the Second World War. Annapolis, Maryland: Naval Institute Press. ISBN 978-1-59114-081-8.
- Friedman, Norman (2011). Naval Weapons of World War One. Barnsley, South Yorkshire, UK: Seaforth. ISBN 978-1-84832-100-7.
- Goldrick, James (2015). Before Jutland: The Naval War in Northern European Waters, August 1914–February 1915. Annapolis, Maryland: Naval Institute Press. ISBN 978-1-59114-349-9.
- Jellicoe, John (1919). The Grand Fleet, 1914–1916: Its Creation, Development, and Work. New York: George H. Doran. OCLC 13614571.
- Newbolt, Henry (1996). Naval Operations. History of the Great War Based on Official Documents. Vol. IV (reprint of the 1928 ed.). Nashville, Tennessee: Battery Press. ISBN 0-89839-253-5.
- Phillips, Lawrie (2014). Pembroke Dockyard and the Old Navy: A Bicentennial History. Stroud, Gloucestershire, UK: The History Press. ISBN 978-0-7509-5214-9.
- Preston, Antony (1985). "Great Britain and Empire Forces". In Gardiner, Robert; Gray, Randal (eds.). Conway's All the World's Fighting Ships 1906–1921. London: Conway Maritime Press. pp. 1–104. ISBN 978-0-85177-245-5.
- Tarrant, V. E. (1999). Jutland: The German Perspective: A New View of the Great Battle, 31 May 1916 (reprint of the 1995 ed.). London: Brockhampton Press. ISBN 978-1-86019-917-2.
