= HMS K2 =

K class submarine

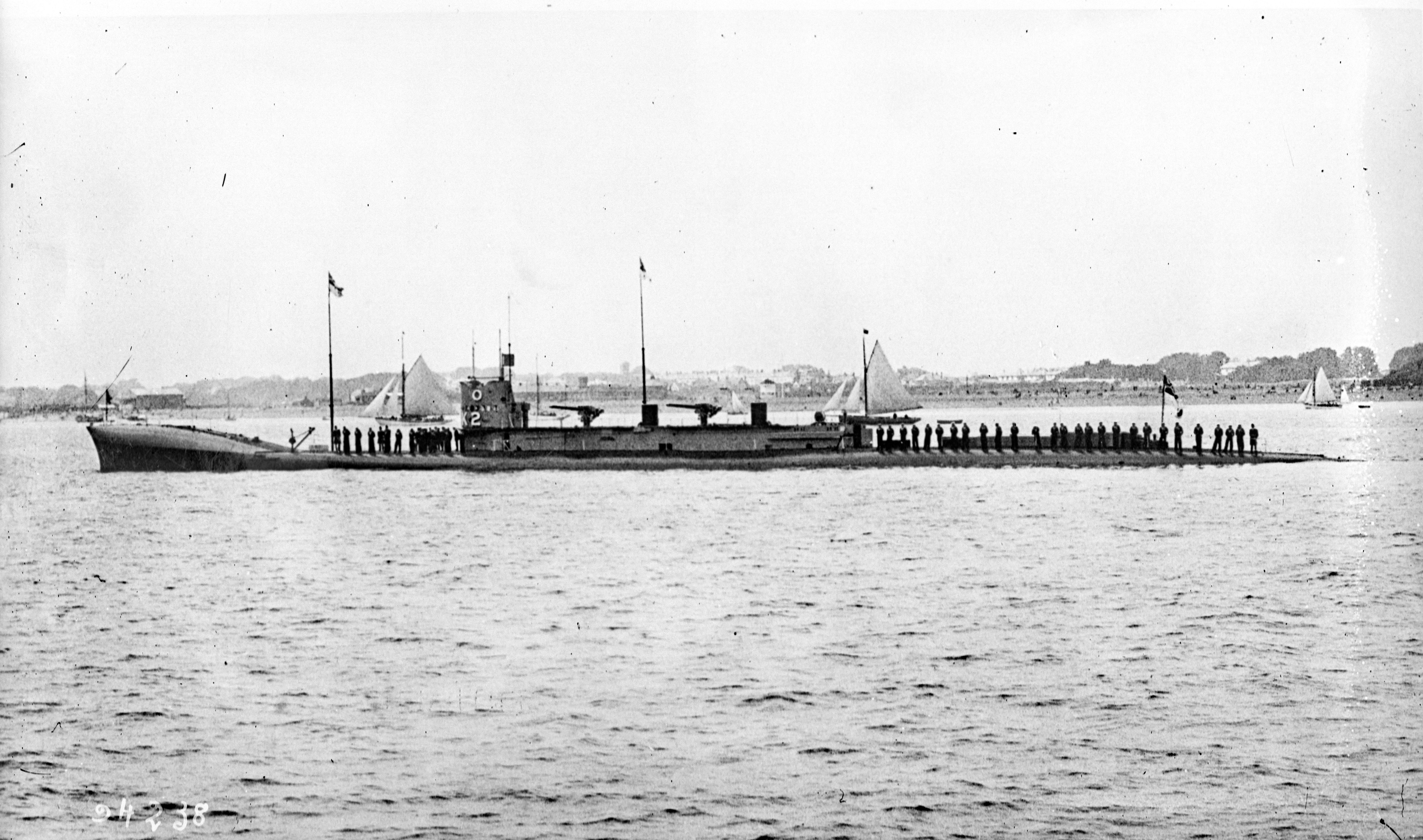
- K2 at Portsmouth in 1924

History

United Kingdom
- Name: HMS K2
- Builder: HM Dockyard Portsmouth
- Laid down: 13 November 1915
- Launched: 14 November 1916
- Commissioned: May 1917
- Fate: Sold, 13 July 1926

General characteristics
- Class & type: K-class submarine
- Displacement: 1,980 long tons (2,010 t) surfaced; 2,566 long tons (2,607 t) submerged
- Length: 339 ft (103 m)
- Beam: 26 ft 6 in (8.08 m)
- Draught: 20 ft 11 in (6.38 m)
- Propulsion: 2 × 10,500 shp (7.8 MW) Brown-Curtis or Parsons geared steam turbines; 2 × Yarrow boilers; 4 × 1,440 hp (1,070 kW) electric motors; 1 × 800 hp (600 kW) Vickers diesel generator for charging batteries on the surface; 2 × 3-blade 7 ft 6 in (2.29 m) diameter screws
- Speed: 24 knots (44 km/h; 28 mph) surfaced; 8 knots (15 km/h; 9.2 mph) submerged
- Range: Surfaced : 800 nmi (1,500 km; 920 mi) at 24 kn (44 km/h; 28 mph); 12,500 nmi (23,200 km; 14,400 mi) at 10 kn (19 km/h; 12 mph); Submerged : 8 nmi (15 km; 9.2 mi) at 8 kn (15 km/h; 9.2 mph); 40 nmi (46 mi; 74 km) at 4 kn (4.6 mph; 7.4 km/h)
- Complement: 59 (6 officers and 53 ratings)
- Armament: 8 × 18 in (460 mm) torpedo tubes, (4 beam, 4 bow); 8 × spare torpedoes; 2 × 18 in torpedo tubes fitted on deck (later removed); 2 × BL 4 in (100 mm) Mk.XI guns; 1 × 3 in (76 mm) gun

HMS K2 was the second of the K class submarines and was built at HM Dockyard, Portsmouth, England. She was laid down on 13 November 1915 and was commissioned in May 1917 one year before the end of World War I. In January 1917, K2 was damaged by an explosion and fire during her first diving trials. On 11 January 1924, it collided with K12 as they departed Portland Harbour. K2 smashed a hole in the forward casing of K12 and buckled her bows for about 6 feet (1.8 m).

On 7 November 1924, K2 collided with H29 during exercises. K2 was sold on 13 July 1926 to John Cashmore Ltd for scrapping at Newport.

== Design ==
Like all British K-class submarines, K2 had a displacement of 1,800 tonnes (2,000 short tons) when at the surface and 2,600 tonnes (2,900 short tons) while submerged. It had a total length of 338 feet (103 m), a beam of 26 feet 6 inches (8.08 m), and a draught of 20 feet 11 inches (6.38 m). The submarine was powered by two oil-fired Yarrow Shipbuilders boilers and one geared Brown-Curtis or Parsons steam turbine; this developed 10,500 ship horsepower (7,800 kW) to drive two 7 feet 6 inches (2.29 m) screws. It also contained four electric motors each producing 350 to 360 horsepower (260 to 270 kW). It was also fitted with a diesel engine providing 800 horsepower (600 kW) to be used when steam was being generated.

The submarine had a maximum surface speed of 24 knots (44 km/h; 28 mph) and a submerged speed of 9 to 9.5 knots (16.7 to 17.6 km/h; 10.4 to 10.9 mph). It could operate at depths of 150 feet (46 m) at 2 knots (3.7 km/h; 2.3 mph) for 80 nautical miles (150 km; 92 mi). K2 was fitted with a 3 inches (76 mm) anti-aircraft gun, ten 18 inches (460 mm) torpedo tubes, and two 4 inches (100 mm) deck guns. Its torpedo tubes were fitted to the bow, the midship section, and two were mounted on the deck. Its complement was fifty-nine crew members.
