= HMS Fearless (1912) =

British Active-class scout cruiser

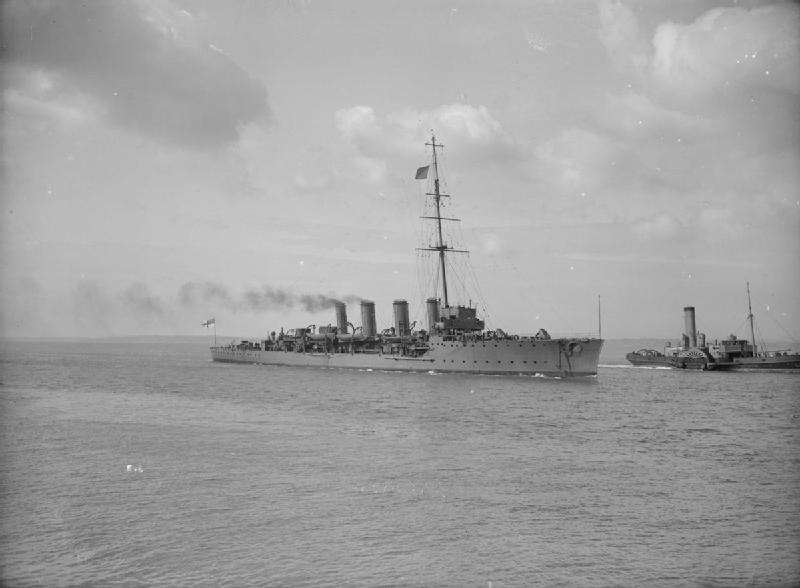
- Fearless underway with a paddle steamer to the right

History

United Kingdom
- Name: HMS Fearless
- Builder: Pembroke Dockyard
- Laid down: 15 November 1911
- Launched: 12 June 1912
- Commissioned: October 1913
- Fate: Sold for scrap, 8 November 1921

General characteristics (as built)
- Class & type: Active-class scout cruiser
- Displacement: 3,340 long tons (3,390 t) (normal)
- Length: 405 ft (123.4 m) (o/a)
- Beam: 41 ft (12.5 m)
- Draught: 14 ft 6 in (4.4 m)
- Installed power: 18,000 shp (13,000 kW); 12 × Yarrow boilers
- Propulsion: 4 × shafts; 2 × Parsons steam turbine sets
- Speed: 25 knots (46 km/h; 29 mph)
- Range: 4,630 nautical miles (8,570 km; 5,330 mi) at 10 knots (19 km/h; 12 mph)
- Complement: 293
- Armament: 10 × single BL 4-inch (102 mm) guns; 4 × single QF 3-pounder 1.9 in (47 mm) guns; 2 × single 18-inch (450 mm) torpedo tubes
- Armour: Deck: 0.5–1 in (13–25 mm); Conning tower: 4 in (102 mm)

HMS Fearless was one of three Active-class scout cruisers built for the Royal Navy shortly before the First World War. Upon completion in 1913, the ship was assigned to the 1st Light Cruiser Squadron (LCS) of the 1st Fleet. She became flotilla leader of the 1st Destroyer Flotilla (DF) shortly before the start of the war in August 1914 and was transferred to the Harwich Force shortly after it began. Fearless participated in the Battle of Heligoland Bight and the Cuxhaven Raid later that year. The ship was transferred to the Grand Fleet in early 1915 and played a minor role in the Battle of Jutland the following year.

Fearless was converted into a submarine depot ship shortly afterwards and briefly deployed to Russia later in the year. She later became the flotilla leader of the 12th Submarine Flotilla (SF), initially based in Scapa Flow, but later in Rosyth. In early 1918, she accidentally rammed and sank one submarine from a different flotilla as part of an incident that sardonically came to be known as the Battle of May Island. The ship survived the war and was sold for scrap in 1921.

== Design and description ==
The Active-class ships were the last class of turbine-powered scout cruisers ordered by the Admiralty. These ships were intended to work with destroyer flotillas, leading their torpedo attacks and backing them up when attacked by other destroyers, although they quickly became less useful as destroyer speeds increased before the First World War. Fearless had a length between perpendiculars of 405 feet (123.4 m), a beam of 41 feet (12.5 m) and a draught of 14 feet 6 inches (4.4 m). She displaced 3,340 long tons (3,394 t) at normal load and 3,945 long tons (4,008 t) at deep load. Her crew consisted of 289 officers and other ranks.

The main armament of the Active class consisted of ten breech-loading (BL) 4-inch (102 mm) Mk VII guns. The forward pair of guns were mounted side by side on a platform on the forecastle, six were amidships, three on each broadside, and the two remaining guns were on the centreline of the quarterdeck, one ahead of the other. The guns fired their 31-pound (14 kg) shells to a range of about 11,400 yards (10,400 m). Her secondary armament was four quick-firing (QF) three-pounder 1.9 in (47 mm) Vickers Mk I guns and two submerged 18-inch (450 mm) torpedo tubes. In 1918, two 4-inch guns were removed from the ship. A QF three-inch 20 cwt (Note: "Cwt" is the abbreviation for hundredweight, 20 cwt referring to the weight of the gun.) anti-aircraft gun was added to Fearless that same year.

As scout cruisers, the ships were only lightly protected to maximise their speed. They had a curved protective deck that was one inch (25 mm) thick on the slope and 0.5 inches (13 mm) on the flat. Their conning tower was protected by four inches of armour.

== Construction and career ==
Fearless, the fifth ship of that name to serve in the Royal Navy, was laid down at Pembroke Dockyard on 15 November 1911, launched on 12 June 1912 and completed in October 1913. The ship was assigned to the 1st LCS when she commissioned that same month. Fearless was serving as the leader of the DF as of 18 July 1914 and was transferred, together with her flotilla, to the Harwich Force after the start of the war. On the morning of 4 August, Commodore Reginald Tyrwhitt, commander of the Harwich Force, led the 1st and 3rd Destroyer Flotillas on a patrol southeast to the vicinity of Borkum, one of the East Frisian Islands, off the Dutch coast. Fearless and her flotilla encountered nothing of note, but the 3rd Flotilla sank the German minelayer Königin Luise, although they accidentally sailed over the minefield that she'd just laid on the return voyage and Fearless's sister ship Amphion struck a mine and sank. On the morning of 17 August, the 1st DF was at sea when some of its destroyers were attacked by the light cruiser SMS Stralsund. They correctly identified the German ship, but Fearless's lookouts misidentified her as an armoured cruiser and her captain ordered his ships to fall back and wait for assistance. After learning of the mistake, he ordered his ships to turn around and attack Stralsund, but it was too late and the Germans had turned for home after misidentifying a distant British ship as another cruiser.

=== Battle of Heligoland Bight ===
The Battle of Heligoland Bight was a British attack on German forces patrolling the Heligoland Bight by the two destroyer flotillas of the Harwich Force on 28 August, supported by a submarine flotilla and the 1st LCS and battlecruisers from the Grand Fleet. The Germans were taken by surprise and the leading 3rd DF damaged several torpedo boats before the light cruiser SMS Stettin made an appearance around 08:00; Fearless hit her once about five minutes later and knocked out one of her guns before the German ship disappeared back into the fog. The Harwich Force turned west at 08:12 to disengage before any further German cruisers made an appearance, but Fearless spotted the torpedo boat SMS V187 three minutes later and opened fire without visible effect and V-187 was able to briefly disengage before being spotted by two light cruisers from the 1st LCS and several British destroyers that sank her. In the meantime, Tyrwhitt's flagship, Arethusa, was badly damaged by SMS Frauenlob and Fearless rendezvoused with her at 08:55 to cover her withdrawal. Around 10:35, SMS Strassburg spotted Arethusa and opened fire, but was driven off by the fire from Fearless and the combined destroyers of both flotillas. Shortly afterwards, Cöln made a brief appearance before disengaging in the face of the massed British ships.

Strassburg, however, reappeared around 11:10 and opened fire on Arethusa again. The repeated appearances by the German cruisers caused Tyrwhitt to ask for assistance from the ships detached from the Grand Fleet. Vice-Admiral David Beatty's battlecruisers turned south at 11:35, right after the 1st DF became embroiled with SMS Mainz. Without Fearless in close support, things looked bad for the British destroyers as they had expended many of their torpedoes earlier in the battle, but the 1st LCS came into sight from the north at 11:50 and quickly began hitting the German cruiser. Shortly afterwards, Mainz was able to turn away into a fogbank, but that put her squarely in the path of Fearless and the rest of the Harwich Force. Fearless soon disabled Mainz's rudder and she began slowly circling. The British ships ceased fire after her last gun ceased firing at 12:25, just as Cöln and Strassburg came into sight from the north. Fearless and three destroyers turned north to engage the cruisers, just as the battlecruisers made an appearance. They drove off those two ships and were later able to sink Cöln and SMS Ariadne as they showed through the mists. While this was happening, the Harwich Force resumed its withdrawal with Fearless taking the crippled destroyer Laertes in tow.

The first attempt to bomb the Zeppelin sheds south of Cuxhaven, Germany was on 24 October, but had to be cancelled because of bad weather. Another was made on 23 November, but it was cancelled when intercepted radio signals revealed that a squadron of armoured cruisers was in their path. The third attempt began on 24 December, with Fearless and eight destroyers from the 1st DF providing close cover for the strike force. The Germans noticed the strike force about 07:30 on the 25th after it had launched its seaplanes north the island of Heligoland. In response, the Germans launched their own aircraft and a Zeppelin to find and attack the British ships; another Zeppelin already airborne was diverted to search for them as well. The British were soon located, but the German attacks by two seaplanes and a Zeppelin were ineffective. Another seaplane attacked Fearless and her half-flotilla without effect and was driven off by the cruiser. After the ships had reached the rendezvous point to pick up the returning aircraft, they were attacked by another Zeppelin, again without effect.

About two weeks prior to the Cuxhaven Raid, German radio traffic had alerted the Admiralty of a German attack on an English port on 15 December. Without knowing the target, the Admiralty realised that it was impossible to intercept the attack, but that it could position forces to get between the High Seas Fleet and its bases. It therefore ordered Fearless and the Harwich Force to patrol the southern North Sea and to shadow the German ships if they were spotted, but the Germans were too far north to intercept. In the aftermath of the Battle of Dogger Bank, the Admiralty believed further raids by battlecruisers would be the most likely course of action selected by the Germans, so it reorganised the Grand Fleet to make better to respond to further raids. One part of this was to reinforce Beatty's new Battlecruiser Fleet with Fearless and her flotilla on 21 February 1915, based at Rosyth, Scotland. Less than a month later, she was ordered to sea, together with nine destroyers, on 9 March to command the successful search for the recently spotted submarine U-12. Six months later, two battlecruiser squadrons, escorted by Fearless and most of the 1st DF, covered the laying of minefields in the southern North Sea on 10 September.

=== Battle of Jutland ===
Maps showing the manoeuvres of the British (blue) and German (red) fleets on 31 May – 1 June 1916

As the Battlecruiser Fleet was cruising south searching for the German battlecruisers on 31 May 1916, Fearless and her destroyers were screening the fast battleships of the 5th Battle Squadron (BS) which was trailing the two battlecruiser squadrons. When the British turned north after spotting the main body of the High Seas Fleet, the 1st DF fell in on the unengaged side of the 5th BS so that their funnel smoke would not obscure the battleships' view of their German opposite numbers. As they got further north, the destroyers pushed forward to screen the battlecruisers while Fearless was too slow to stay with them and remained on the unengaged side of the 5th BS, and later of the Grand Fleet after the two forces rendezvoused. As night fell, she found herself trailing the 1st Battle Squadron. That squadron's flagship, Marlborough, had been torpedoed earlier, but by the middle of the night she was forced to reduce speed and turn for home. Vice-Admiral Cecil Burney, the squadron commander, summoned Fearless to the flagship to transfer him and his staff to the battleship Revenge. Fearless was then ordered to escort Marlborough home. The return voyage was rather eventful as the two ships engaged a Zeppelin without effect early on the morning of 1 June and Marlborough was near-missed by SM U-46 about 10:55. Later that evening the weather worsened and the water was rising faster than it could be pumped out. At 00:47 on 2 June, the battleship warned Fearless and her escorting destroyers that they should be prepared to come alongside and rescue her crew. This proved unnecessary as the pumps began to draw ahead of the incoming water and the destroyers laid an oil slick to moderate the waves ahead of Marlborough. She reached the Humber at 08:00 and Fearless departed for South Queensferry later that morning. She was undamaged in the battle and only fired three 4-inch rounds in the entire battle.

The ship arrived at Belfast, Northern Ireland, on 19 July to begin a lengthy refit to convert her into a submarine depot ship that lasted until 4 October. Nine days later, Fearless sailed for Murmansk, Russia, and arrived there on the 19th to serve as the depot ship for several British G-class submarines based there. The ship sailed back to Britain on 15 November, together with all three of her submarines. By January 1917 she was the leader of the 12th Submarine Flotilla of the Grand Fleet, made up of the notoriously accident-prone K-class steam-powered submarines, that was based at Scapa Flow. From 3–17 March, Fearless was refitted at Invergordon. On 17 July, she and her flotilla transferred to Rosyth, Scotland.

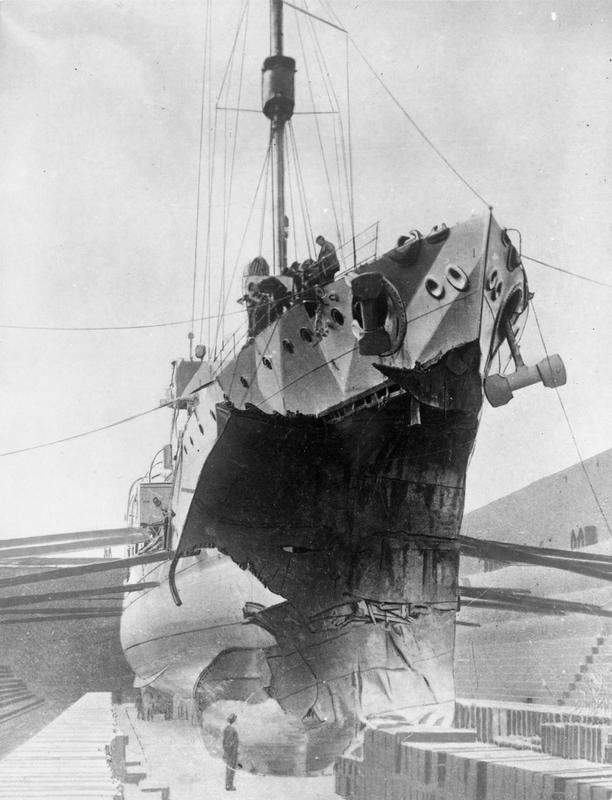
The damaged bow of Fearless in drydock after colliding with the submarine K17, 31 January 1918

On the evening of 31 January 1918, the Light Cruiser Force sortied from Rosyth to participate in a training exercise with elements of the Grand Fleet. The 12th and 13th Submarine Flotillas were sandwiched by squadrons of battlecruisers and battleships as the ships departed in poor visibility. Around 19:14 the steering gear of one of the 13th SF's submarines failed and she fell out of the formation. One of the trailing submarines did not see her in time and accidentally rammed her, badly damaging both boats. Commander William Leir commanded the 13th SF and decided to turn his flotilla around to their aid after he was notified of the accident around 17:40. In doing so, his ships crossed the path of the oncoming 12th SF and Fearless accidentally rammed and sank the submarine HMS K17. Captain Charles Little attempted to avoid her, but the cruiser was moving too fast to do so. She launched her boats in a failed attempt to rescue any survivors, but the few found were recovered by one of the other submarines. The bulkheads in Fearless' bow had to be shored up to prevent further flooding, but she was not in any danger of sinking and returned to Rosyth at a very slow speed. She was repaired and survived the war, but was sold for scrap in November 1921.

== Bibliography ==
- Campbell, N. J. M. (1986). Jutland: An Analysis of the Fighting. Annapolis, Maryland: Naval Institute Press. ISBN 978-0-87021-324-3.
- Castle, Ian (2011). The Zeppelin Base Raids, Germany 1914. Oxford, UK: Osprey. ISBN 978-1-84908-243-3.
- Colledge, J. J.; Warlow, Ben (2006) [1969]. Ships of the Royal Navy: The Complete Record of All Fighting Ships of the Royal Navy from the 15th Century to the Present (3rd Rev ed.). London: Chatham Publishing. ISBN 978-1-86176-281-8. OCLC 67375475.
- Corbett, Julian (1997). Naval Operations to the Battle of the Falklands. History of the Great War: Based on Official Documents. Vol. I (2nd, reprint of the 1938 ed.). London and Nashville, Tennessee: Imperial War Museum and Battery Press. ISBN 978-0-89839-256-2.
- Corbett, Julian (1997). Naval Operations. History of the Great War: Based on Official Documents. Vol. II (reprint of the 1929 second ed.). London and Nashville, Tennessee: Imperial War Museum in association with the Battery Press. ISBN 978-1-87042-374-8.
- Corbett, Julian (1997). Naval Operations. History of the Great War: Based on Official Documents. Vol. III (reprint of the 1940 second ed.). London and Nashville, Tennessee: Imperial War Museum in association with the Battery Press. ISBN 978-1-87042-350-2.
- Friedman, Norman (2009). British Destroyers From Earliest Days to the Second World War. Annapolis, Maryland: Naval Institute Press. ISBN 978-1-59114-081-8.
- Friedman, Norman (2011). Naval Weapons of World War One. Barnsley, South Yorkshire, UK: Seaforth. ISBN 978-1-84832-100-7.
- Goldrick, James (2015). Before Jutland: The Naval War in Northern European Waters, August 1914–February 1915. Annapolis, Maryland: Naval Institute Press. ISBN 978-1-59114-349-9.
- Nash, N.S. (2009). K Boat Catastrophe: Eight Ships and Five Collisions: The Full Story of the 'Battle of the Isle of May'. Barnsley, UK: Pen & Sword Maritime. ISBN 978-1-84415-984-0.
- Preston, Antony (1985). "Great Britain and Empire Forces". In Gardiner, Robert; Gray, Randal (eds.). Conway's All the World's Fighting Ships 1906–1921. London: Conway Maritime Press. pp. 1–104. ISBN 978-0-85177-245-5.
- "Transcript: HMS FEARLESS – April 1916 to August 1917, British waters, Battle of Jutland, Russian Waters, UK Home". Royal Navy Log Books of the World War 1 Era. Naval-History.net.
