= HMS K11 =

British K Class Submarine

History

United Kingdom
- Name: HMS K11
- Builder: Armstrong Whitworth, Newcastle upon Tyne
- Laid down: October 1915
- Launched: 16 August 1916
- Commissioned: February 1917
- Fate: Sold, 4 November 1921. Sunk

General characteristics
- Class & type: K-class submarine
- Displacement: 1,980 long tons (2,010 t) surfaced; 2,566 long tons (2,607 t) submerged
- Length: 339 ft (103 m)
- Beam: 26 ft 6 in (8.08 m)
- Draught: 20 ft 11 in (6.38 m)
- Propulsion: 2 × 10,500 shp (7.8 MW) Brown-Curtis or Parsons geared steam turbines; 2 × Yarrow boilers; 4 × 1,440 hp (1,070 kW) electric motors; 1 × 800 hp (600 kW) Vickers diesel generator for charging batteries on the surface; 2 × 3-blade 7 ft 6 in (2.29 m) diameter screws
- Speed: 24 knots (44 km/h; 28 mph) surfaced; 8 knots (15 km/h; 9.2 mph) submerged
- Range: Surfaced : 800 nmi (1,500 km; 920 mi) at 24 kn (44 km/h; 28 mph); 12,500 nmi (23,200 km; 14,400 mi) at 10 kn (19 km/h; 12 mph); Submerged : 8 nmi (15 km; 9.2 mi) at 8 kn (15 km/h; 9.2 mph); 40 nmi (46 mi; 74 km) at 4 kn (4.6 mph; 7.4 km/h)
- Complement: 59 (6 officers and 53 ratings)
- Armament: 8 × 18 in (460 mm) torpedo tubes, (4 beam, 4 bow); 8 × spare torpedoes; 2 × 18 in torpedo tubes fitted on deck (later removed); 2 × BL 4 in (100 mm) Mk.XI guns; 1 × 3 in (76 mm) gun

HMS K11 was a K class submarine built by Armstrong Whitworth, Newcastle upon Tyne. K11 was laid down in October 1915, and commissioned in February 1917. It had a complement of 59 crew members.

In 1917, K11 was damaged by fire during a North Sea patrol. She was forced to surface and was towed by a destroyer. K11 was part of the disastrous Battle of May Island exercise. She was forced to take avoiding action to avoid K14, but survived the exercise. K11 was sold for scrap along with HMS K10 on 4 November 1921, both sank during towing in the North Sea.

== Design ==
Like all British K-class submarines, K9 had a displacement of 1,800 long tons (1,800 t) when at the surface and 2,600 long tons (2,600 t) while submerged. It had a total length of 338 feet (103 m), a beam of 26 feet 6 inches (8.08 m), and a draught of 20 ft 11 in (6.38 m). The submarine was powered by two oil-fired Yarrow Shipbuilders boilers and one geared Brown-Curtis or Parsons steam turbine; this developed 10,500 ship horsepower (7,800 kW) to drive two 7 ft 6 in (2.29 m) screws. It also contained four electric motors each producing 350 to 360 horsepower (260 to 270 kW). It was also fitted with a diesel engine providing 800 hp (600 kW) to be used when steam was being raised, or instead of raising steam.

The submarine had a maximum surface speed of 24 kn (44 km/h; 28 mph) and a submerged speed of 9 to 9.5 kn (16.7 to 17.6 km/h). It could operate at depths of 150 ft (46 m) at 2 kn (3.7 km/h) for 80 nmi (150 km). K9 was fitted with a 3 inches (76 mm) anti-aircraft gun, ten 18-inch (460 mm) torpedo tubes, and two 4-inch (100 mm) deck guns. Its torpedo tubes were fitted to the bow, the midship section, and two were mounted on the deck. Its complement was fifty-nine crew members.

== Bibliography ==
- Hutchinson, Robert. Submarines, War Beneath The Waves, from 1776 to the Present Day.
