= HMS Amphion (1911) =

Active-class cruiser

Coordinates: 52.11°N 2.36°E

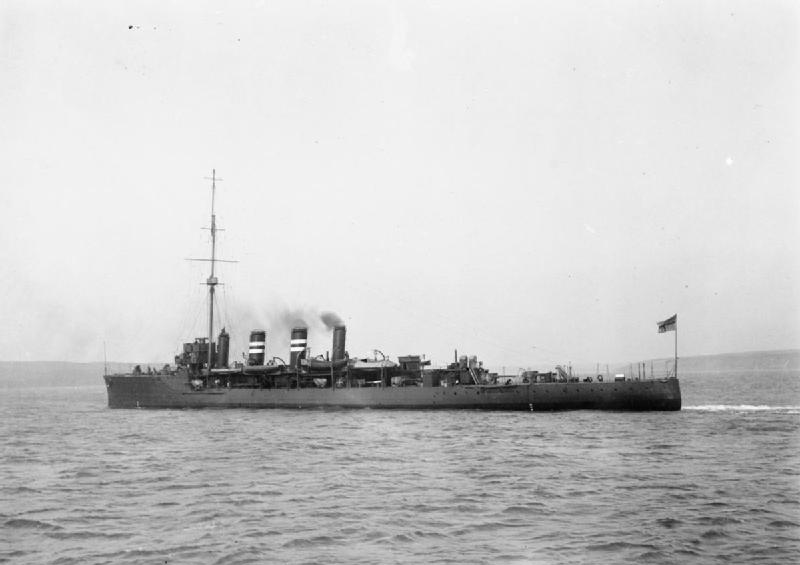
- Amphion about 1914

History

United Kingdom
- Name: Amphion
- Ordered: 1910 Naval Programme
- Builder: Pembroke Dockyard
- Laid down: 15 March 1911
- Launched: 4 December 1911
- Completed: March 1913
- Fate: Sunk by mine, 6 August 1914

General characteristics (as built)
- Class & type: Active-class scout cruiser
- Displacement: 3,340 long tons (3,390 t) (normal)
- Length: 405 ft (123.4 m) (o/a)
- Beam: 41 ft (12.5 m)
- Draught: 14 ft 6 in (4.4 m)
- Installed power: 12 × Yarrow boilers; 18,000 shp (13,000 kW)
- Propulsion: 4 × shafts; 2 × steam turbine sets
- Speed: 25 knots (46 km/h; 29 mph)
- Range: 4,630 nmi (8,570 km; 5,330 mi) at 10 knots (19 km/h; 12 mph)
- Complement: 293
- Armament: 10 × single 4 in (102 mm) guns; 4 × single 3-pdr 47 mm (1.9 in) guns; 2 × single 18 in (450 mm) torpedo tubes
- Armour: Deck: 0.5–1 in (13–25 mm); Conning tower: 4 in (102 mm)

HMS Amphion was an Active-class scout cruiser built for the Royal Navy before the First World War. Completed in 1913, she was initially assigned to the First Fleet and became a destroyer flotilla leader in mid-1914. When the war began, her flotilla was assigned to the Harwich Force. While patrolling on the first full day of the war, Amphion and her destroyers encountered and sank a German minelayer, SMS Königin Luise, but not before she had laid many of her mines. While returning from patrolling the following morning, Amphion struck a mine on 6 August 1914 off the Thames Estuary and sank with the loss of 132 crewmen killed. She was the first ship of the Royal Navy to be sunk in the First World War. The wreck site is protected and may not be dived upon without permission from the Ministry of Defence.

== Design and description ==
The Active-class ships were the last class of turbine-powered scout cruisers ordered by the Admiralty. These ships were intended to work with destroyer flotillas, leading their torpedo attacks and backing them up when attacked by other destroyers, although they quickly became less useful as destroyer speeds increased before the First World War. Amphion had a length between perpendiculars of 405 feet (123.4 m), a beam of 41 feet (12.5 m) and a draught of 14 feet 6 inches (4.4 m). She displaced 3,340 long tons (3,394 t) at normal load and 3,945 long tons (4,008 t) at deep load. Her crew consisted of 289 officers and ratings.

The main armament of the Active class consisted of ten breech-loading (BL) 4-inch (102 mm) Mk VII guns. The forward pair of guns were mounted side by side on a platform on the forecastle, six were amidships, three on each broadside, and the two remaining guns were on the centreline of the quarterdeck, one ahead of the other. The guns fired their 31-pound (14 kg) shells to a range of about 11,400 yards (10,400 m). Her secondary armament was four quick-firing (QF) three-pounder 1.9 in (47 mm) Vickers Mk I guns and two submerged 18-inch (450 mm) torpedo tubes.

As scout cruisers, the ships were only lightly protected to maximise their speed. They had a curved protective deck that was one inch (25 mm) thick on the slope and 0.5 inches (13 mm) on the flat. Their conning tower was protected by four inches of armour.

== Construction and career ==
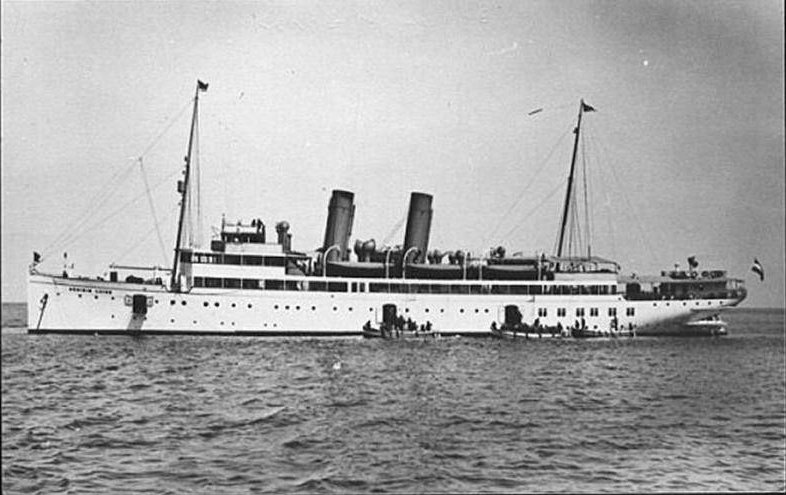
SMS Königin Luise

Ordered as part of the 1910 Naval Programme, Amphion was laid down at Pembroke Dockyard's No. 5 Slipway on 15 March 1911 and launched on 4 December by Mrs. Mundy, wife of the dockyard's Captain-Superintendent, Captain Geoffrey Mundy. She was completed in March 1913 and her first commander was Captain Frederic Dreyer with Lieutenant John Tovey as his First Lieutenant. Amphion was commissioned on 2 April and assigned to the 4th Battle Squadron of the First Fleet. A month later, the ship was assigned to the 1st Light Cruiser Squadron by 18 May. She remained with the squadron for nearly a year and was serving as the flotilla leader of the 3rd Destroyer Flotilla by 18 June 1914.

By the start of the First World War in August, Amphion and her flotilla was assigned to the Harwich Force, defending the eastern approaches to the English Channel, under the command of Captain Cecil H. Fox. In the morning of 5 August, Amphion and the 3rd Flotilla sortied into the North Sea to patrol the area between Harwich and the Dutch island of Terschelling for German activity. At 10:15 a ship in the black, buff, and yellow colours of the Great Eastern Railway's steamers that plied between Harwich and the Hook of Holland was spotted. Fox sent the destroyers Lance and Landrail to investigate and shortly afterwards another destroyer reported that a trawler had seen a suspicious ship, 'throwing things overboard, presumably mines'. Amphion led the flotilla to investigate and observed that the fleeing ship was deploying mines even then. At 10:45, Lance opened fire at a range of 4,400 yards (4,000 m).

The target was SMS Königin Luise, a former Hamburg-Heligoland excursion boat that had been converted to an auxiliary minelayer by the Germans. They had planned to mount a pair of 8.8-centimetre (3.5 in) guns on board, but they did not have the time to do so; her only armament was a pair of lighter guns and 180 mines. On the night of 4 August, she had departed Emden and headed into the North Sea to lay mines off the Thames Estuary, which she began to do at dawn.

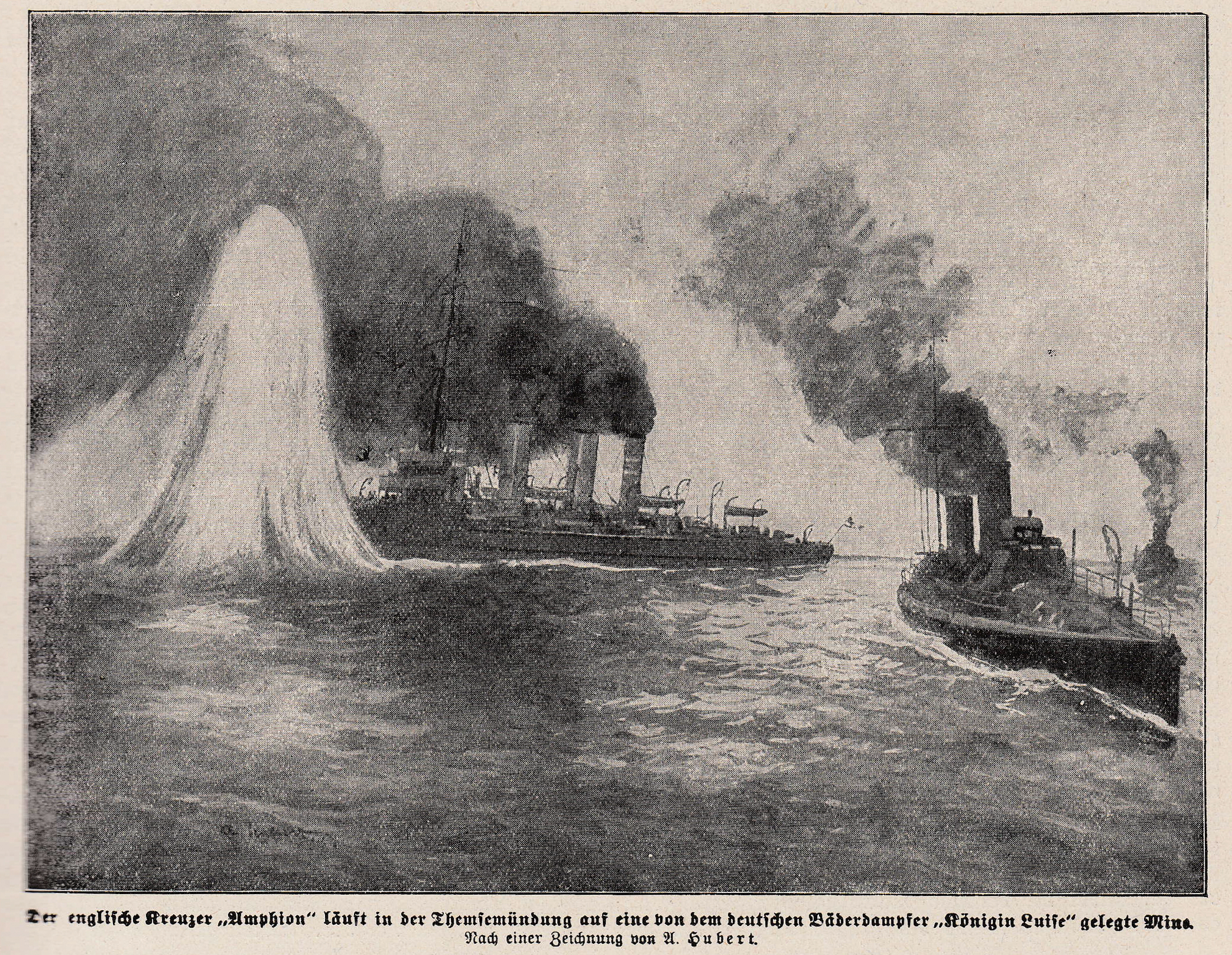
A German drawing of Amphion striking a mine

The fire from the destroyers was ineffective until Amphion closed to a range of 7,000 yards (6,400 m) and began hitting the German ship at about 11:15. By noon, Königin Luise was sinking and the three British ships rescued 5 officers and 70 ratings. The flotilla proceeded onwards with their patrol until they reached the Dutch coast around 21:00 and turned for home. Fox was uncertain as to the locations of the mines laid by Königin Luise and laid a course that was seven nautical miles (13 km; 8.1 mi) west of where he thought the mines were. He guessed wrongly and led his flotilla over the danger area.

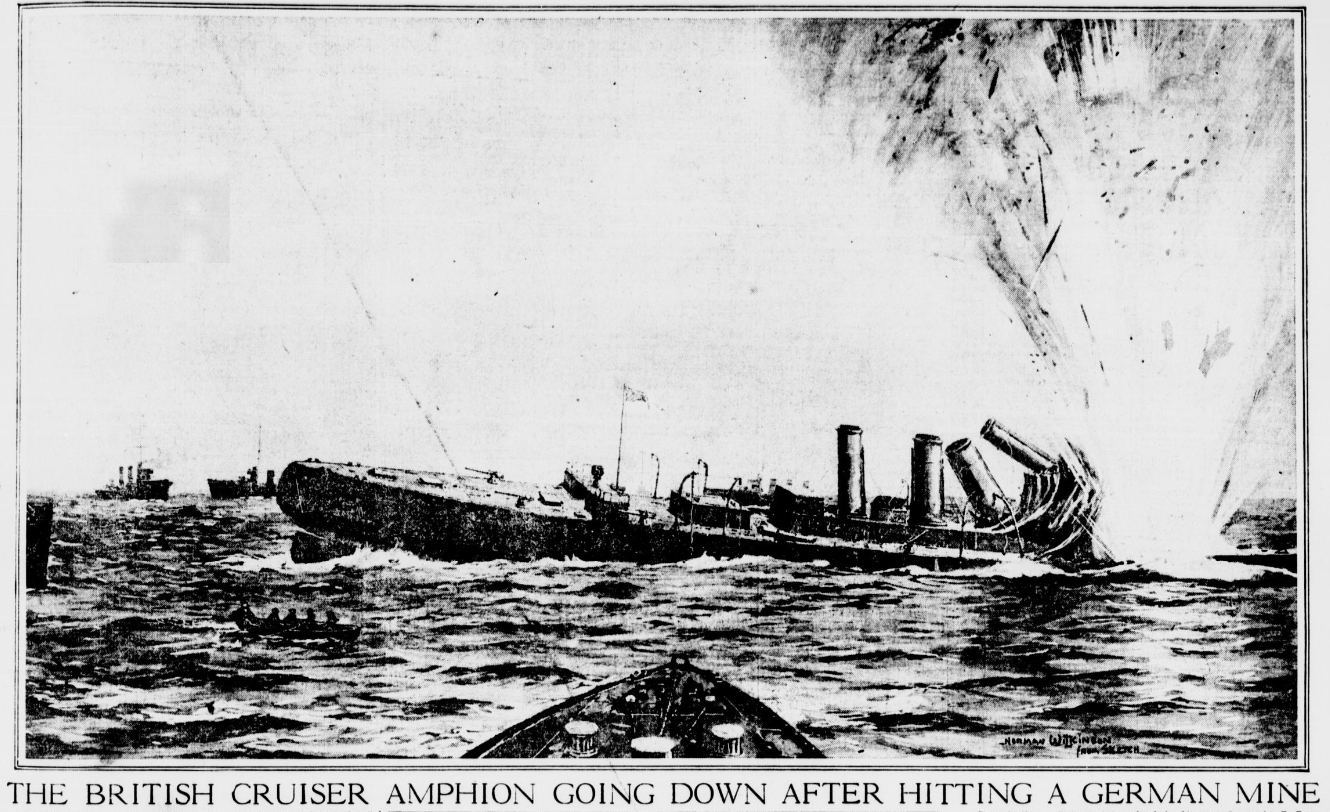
A fanciful drawing of Amphion sinking

At 06:35, Amphion struck a mine that detonated underneath her bridge. The explosion set her forecastle on fire and broke the ship's keel. The destroyer Linnet attempted to tow the cruiser, but a deep crack across her upper deck showed that she was hogging badly and Fox ordered his crew to abandon ship. Shortly afterwards, her forward magazine exploded, throwing one 4-inch gun into the air that narrowly missed Linnet. One of Amphion's shells burst on the deck of the destroyer Lark, killing two of her men and the only German prisoner rescued from the cruiser. Amphion then rapidly sank within 15 minutes of the explosion losing 1 officer and 131 ratings killed in the sinking, plus an unknown number of the crew rescued from Königin Luise. The wreck is a protected site under the Protection of Military Remains Act 1986.
