= HMS Linnet (1913) =

Laforey-class destroyer

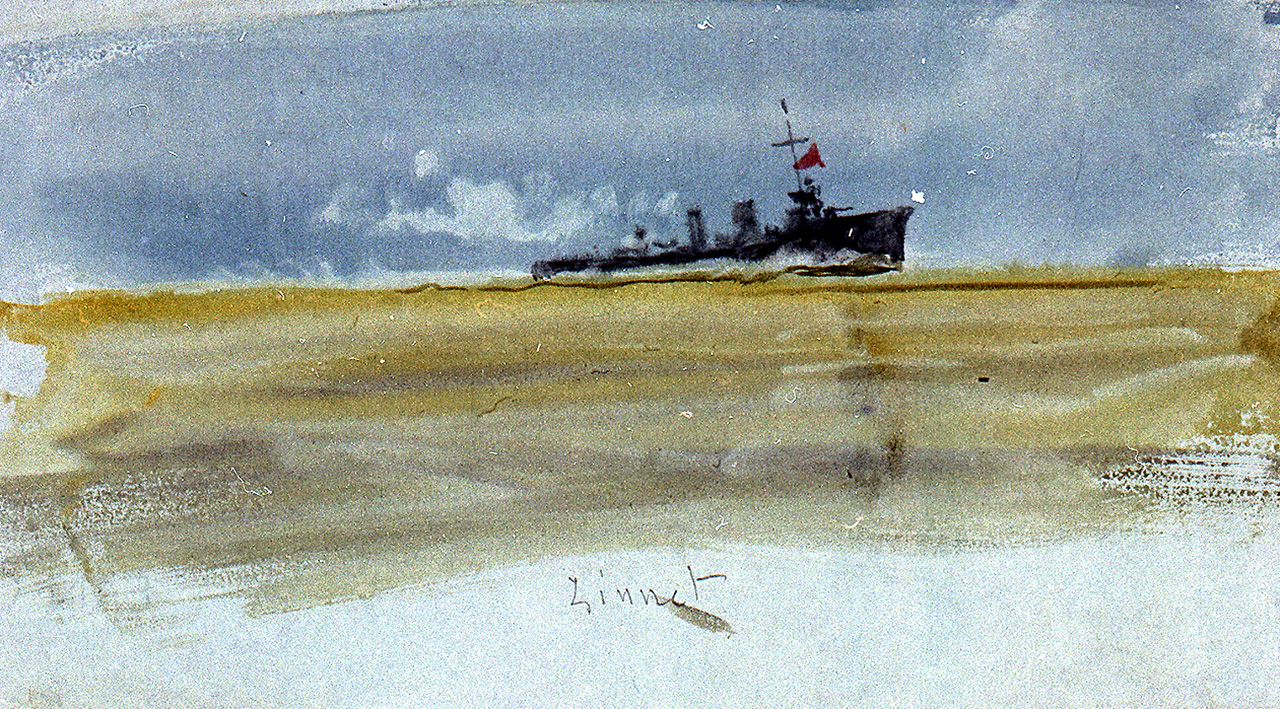
- HMS Linnet by William Lionel Wyllie

History

United Kingdom
- Name: HMS Linnet
- Namesake: Linnet
- Builder: Yarrow, Scotstoun
- Yard number: 1333
- Laid down: 28 June 1912
- Launched: 16 August 1913
- Out of service: 4 November 1921
- Fate: Broken up by Rees of Llanelli

General characteristics (as built)
- Class & type: Laforey-class destroyer
- Displacement: 970 long tons (990 t) (normal); 1,150 long tons (1,170 t) (deep load)
- Length: 268 ft 8 in (81.9 m) o/a
- Beam: 27 ft 8 in (8.43 m)
- Draught: 10 ft 6 in (3.20 m)
- Installed power: 3 Yarrow boilers, 24,500 shp (18,300 kW)
- Propulsion: Brown-Curtis steam turbines, 2 shafts
- Speed: 29 knots (33.4 mph; 53.7 km/h)
- Range: 1,720 nmi (3,190 km) at 15 kn (28 km/h)
- Complement: 73
- Armament: 3 × single QF 4-inch (102 mm) Mark IV guns; 1 × single 7.7 mm (0.3 in) Maxim gun; 2 × twin 21 in (533 mm) torpedo tubes

HMS Linnet was a Laforey-class destroyer that served with the Royal Navy during the First World War. Launched on 16 August 1913 as HMS Havock, the ship was renamed on 30 September under an Admiralty order to become one of the first destroyers in a class named alphabetically. This convention subsequently became the norm. On commissioning, the vessel joined the Third Destroyer Flotilla and operated as part of the Harwich Force. The destroyer was first commanded by Commander Loftus Jones who named his daughter Linnette after the ship. During the War, the destroyer took part in the Battle of Heligoland Bight in 1914, and escorted minelayers on missions to lay mines. It was during one the latter missions that the ship was nearly hit by a gun hurled from the stricken minelayer Amphion. With the cessation of hostilities, the ship was placed in reserve and sold to be broken up on 4 November 1921.

== Design and development ==
Linnet was one of twenty-two L- or Laforey-class destroyers built for the Royal Navy, and one of four ordered from Yarrow. The design followed the preceding Acasta-class but with improved seakeeping properties and armament, including twice the number of torpedo tubes.

The destroyer had a length overall of 268 feet 8 inches (81.89 m), a beam of 27 feet 8 inches (8.43 m) and a draught of 10 feet 6 inches (3.20 m). Displacement was 970 long tons (990 t) normal and 1,150 long tons (1,170 t) deep load. Power was provided by three Yarrow boilers feeding two Brown-Curtis steam turbines which had a combined rating of 24,500 shaft horsepower (18,300 kW) and driving two shafts, to give a design speed of 29 knots (54 km/h; 33 mph). Two funnels were fitted. A total of 268 long tons (272 t) of oil was carried, giving a design range of 1,720 nautical miles (3,190 km; 1,980 mi) at 15 knots (28 km/h; 17 mph). The ship's complement was 73 officers and ratings.

Armament consisted of three QF 4 in (102 mm) Mk IV guns on the ship's centreline, with one on the forecastle, one aft and one between the funnels. The guns could fire a shell weighing 31 pounds (14 kg) at a muzzle velocity of 2,177 feet per second (664 m/s). One single 7.7 mm (0.3 in) Maxim gun was carried. A single 2-pounder 40 mm (2 in) "pom-pom" anti-aircraft gun was later added. Torpedo armament consisted of two twin mounts for 21 in (533 mm) torpedoes mounted aft. Capacity to lay four Vickers Elia Mk.4 mines was included, but the facility was never used. A chute and two launchers for depth charges were later added, and were successfully tested simultaneously in June 1917.

== Construction and career ==
Originally named Havock, the destroyer was laid down by Yarrow at Scotstoun on the River Clyde on 28 June 1912 alongside the similar HMS Haughly and allocated the yard number 1333. The ship was launched on 16 August 1913 and renamed Linnet by Admiralty order on 30 September 1913. Built under the 1912–1913 Programme as part of a class named after characters in Shakespeare's plays and the Waverley novels by Sir Walter Scott, the destroyer joined what was to be the first alphabetical class, with each successive class of destroyers named after a letter of the alphabet. The name of Linnet, recalling the bird in the finch family, was first used by the Royal Navy in 1797, with this vessel the tenth of the name.

On commissioning, the newly renamed Linnet joined the Third Destroyer Flotilla as part of the Harwich Force. Command was given to Commander Loftus Jones, who later went on to receive the Victoria Cross at the Battle of Jutland. He named his daughter Linnette after the ship.

After the British declaration of war and the start of the First World War on 4 August 1914, the destroyer accompanied the minelayer Amphion on a mission to intercept the German auxiliary SMS Königin Luise. The German vessel was sunk, but had already laid its own minefield. Amphion struck a mine on 6 August and, despite efforts by the destroyer's crew to tow the crippled ship to safety, the ship was abandoned. Shortly afterwards, it exploded, one of the guns flying through the air and narrowly missing Linnet.

Later that month, on 26 August, the flotilla was ordered to attack German torpedo boats on their patrol as part of a large Royal Navy fleet in what was to be the Battle of Heligoland Bight. On 28 August, the destroyer formed part of the second flotilla, led by sistership Lark, which attacked the German light cruisers Mainz and Strassburg. The destroyer, along with ten other vessels, attacked the ships at short range with both shells and torpedoes. However, the limitations of technology at the time, particularly the difficulty in hitting a lone target with unguided torpedoes and the lack of effective fire control for the guns, meant that the impact of the attack was small. In all, the ship expended 227 rounds of ammunition in the battle.

By the start of the following year, the vessel had moved to the Ninth Destroyer Flotilla. The destroyer remained at Harwich, undertaking a number of escort roles during the rest of the War. For example, on 20 March 1916, the destroyer formed part of the escort for four British minelayers, including HMS Princess Margaret, while also providing support for a bombing mission against the seaplane sheds at Zeebrugge. The destroyer was attacked by a German force, including the torpedo boat V47, but managed to escape without casualties.

After the Armistice of 11 November 1918 that ended the war, the Royal Navy returned to a peacetime level of strength and both the number of ships and personnel needed to be reduced to save money. Linnet was initially placed in reserve at Nore alongside over sixty other destroyers. On 4 November 1921, the vessel was sold to Rees of Llanelli and broken up.

== Pennant numbers ==
Pennant number	Date
H43	December 1914
H59	January 1918
H53	January 1919
