= SS Königin Luise (1913) =

German steam ferry; used as a minelayer in World War I

Coordinates: 51.8667°N 2.5000°E

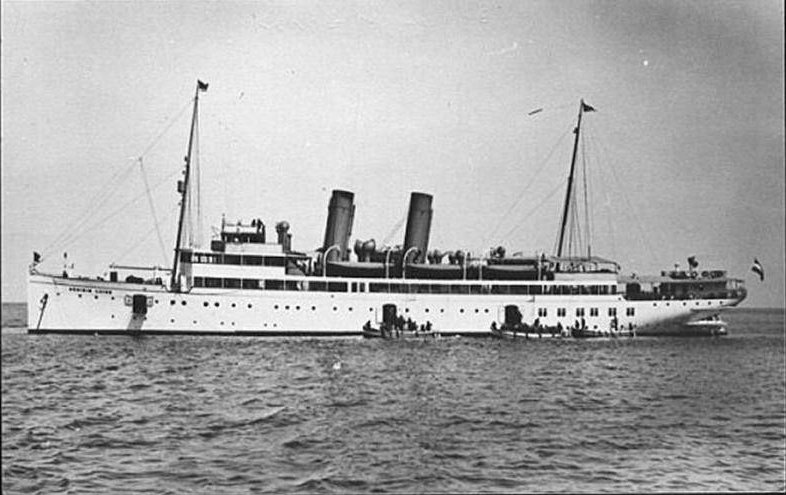

History
- Name: SS Königin Luise
- Operator: Hamburg America Line
- Builder: AG Vulcan Stettin
- Laid down: 1913
- Launched: 8 May 1913
- Acquired: Taken over by the Kaiserliche Marine on 3 August 1914
- Fate: Sunk on 5 August 1914

General characteristics
- Class & type: Steam ferry
- Tonnage: 2,150 tones
- Length: 310 ft (94 m)
- Beam: 40 ft (12 m)
- Draught: 11 ft (3.4 m)
- Propulsion: 6500 shp
- Speed: 20 knots (37 km/h)
- Armament: 2 × revolver cannons; 200 × mines

SS Königin Luise was a German steam ferry. She operated between Hamburg and the Netherlands, before being taken over by the Kaiserliche Marine on the outbreak of the First World War. She was used as an auxiliary minelayer before being sunk on 5 August 1914.

== Construction and early career ==
Königin Luise was laid down at AG Vulcan Stettin in 1913, and launched on 8 May 1913 for service with the Hamburg America Line. After serving for some time as a ferry, she was requisitioned by the Kaiserliche Marine on 3 August 1914 to serve as an auxiliary minelayer, carrying 200 naval mines. She was fitted with two revolver cannons, and there were plans to fit her with two 88 mm guns, but the British entry to the war on 4 August led to the navy pressing Königin Luise into immediate action. She was disguised in the black, buff, and yellow colours of the steamers of the Great Eastern Railway that sailed between Harwich and the Hook of Holland, and sailed from Emden on the night of 4 August. Her captain, Commander Biermann, had orders to lay mines off the Thames Estuary.

== Minelaying and encounter with the British ==
Königin Luise was able to lay a number of mines off the coast during the night, but was sighted by a number of fishing vessels. The light cruiser Amphion of the Harwich Force and a number of destroyers of the 3rd Flotilla sailed early in the morning of 5 August and headed towards Heligoland Bight. On the way they encountered a fishing boat, whose occupants informed the British force that they had seen an unknown ship "throwing things over the side" about 20 nautical miles (37 km; 23 mi) north of the Outer Gabbard. Amphion and the destroyers set off to investigate.

The taskforce spotted Königin Luise at 10:25, and the destroyers Lance and Landrail moved to investigate. Königin Luise fled at her top speed, moving into a rain squall, where she proceeded to lay more mines. Lance and Landrail gave chase, signalling to the rest of the force that they were engaging. Lance opened fire, one of the first British shots of the war. Amphion soon closed and also began to fire on the fleeing Königin Luise. The German ship attempted to escape to neutral waters to the south-east, while leading the pursuing British through her minefield, but under heavy and accurate fire, Commander Biermann ordered the scuttling of the ship. The surviving crew abandoned ship, and Königin Luise rolled over to port and sank at 12:22. 46 of the 100 crew were rescued by the British ships. She was the first German naval loss of the war.

== Loss of Amphion ==
The British ships continued their patrol, before heading back to port that evening. Their course took them through the minefield Königin Luise had previously laid, and at 06:45 on the morning of 6 August Amphion struck one of the mines. Heavily damaged, she was abandoned, with her crew being taken off by the escorting destroyers. Amphion drifted back into the minefield, struck another mine at 07:03 and sank, becoming the first British naval war loss, with 132 men killed, the first British casualties of the war. Nineteen of the 21 German POWs died on the Amphion when she sank plus one German POW killed on HMS Lark also lost by misadventure because of an Amphion shell.
