= HMS K12 =

British K Class Submarine

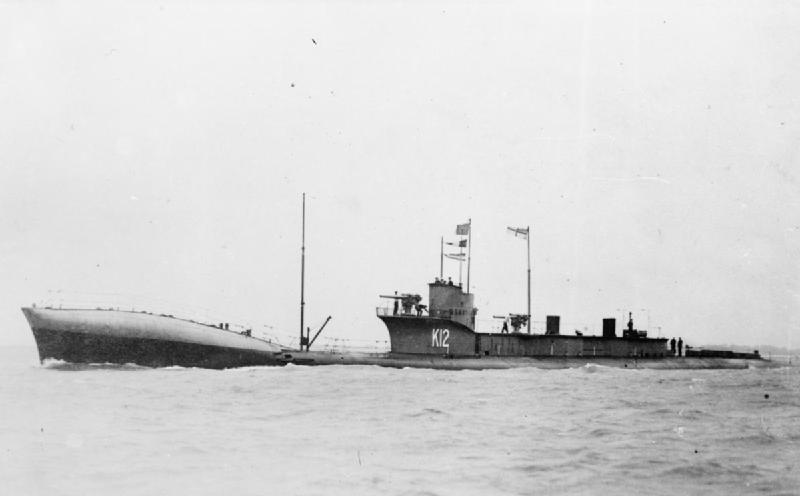
- K12 circa. 1924

History

United Kingdom
- Name: HMS K12
- Builder: Armstrong Whitworth, Newcastle upon Tyne
- Laid down: October 1915
- Launched: 23 February 1917
- Commissioned: August 1917
- Fate: Scrapped, 1926

General characteristics
- Class & type: K-class submarine
- Displacement: 1,980 long tons (2,010 t) surfaced; 2,566 long tons (2,607 t) submerged
- Length: 339 ft (103 m)
- Beam: 26 ft 6 in (8.08 m)
- Draught: 20 ft 11 in (6.38 m)
- Propulsion: 2 × 10,500 shp (7.8 MW) Brown-Curtis or Parsons geared steam turbines; 2 × Yarrow boilers; 4 × 1,440 hp (1,070 kW) electric motors; 1 × 800 hp (600 kW) Vickers diesel generator for charging batteries on the surface; 2 × 3-blade 7 ft 6 in (2.29 m) diameter screws
- Speed: 24 knots (44 km/h; 28 mph) surfaced; 8 knots (15 km/h; 9.2 mph) submerged
- Range: Surfaced : 800 nmi (1,500 km; 920 mi) at 24 kn (44 km/h; 28 mph); 12,500 nmi (23,200 km; 14,400 mi) at 10 kn (19 km/h; 12 mph); Submerged : 8 nmi (15 km; 9.2 mi) at 8 kn (15 km/h; 9.2 mph); 40 nmi (46 mi; 74 km) at 4 kn (4.6 mph; 7.4 km/h)
- Complement: 59 (6 officers and 53 ratings)
- Armament: 8 × 18 in (460 mm) torpedo tubes, (4 beam, 4 bow); 8 × spare torpedoes; 2 × 18 in torpedo tubes fitted on deck (later removed); 2 × BL 4 in (100 mm) Mk.XI guns; 1 × 3 in (76 mm) gun

HMS K12 was a K class submarine built by Armstrong Whitworth, Newcastle upon Tyne. She was laid down in October 1915 and commissioned in August 1917.

K12 took part in the Battle of May Island, surviving the disastrous exercise. K12 collided with K2 in 1924; K2 smashed a hole in the forward casing of K12 while K2 buckled her bows for about six feet. K12 was scrapped in 1926 in Charlestown.

== Design ==
K12 displaced 1,800 long tons (1,800 t) when at the surface and 2,600 long tons (2,600 t) while submerged. It had a total length of 338 feet (103 m), a beam of 26 feet 6 inches (8.08 m), and a draught of 20 ft 11 in (6.38 m). The submarine was powered by two oil-fired Yarrow Shipbuilders boilers supplying one geared Brown-Curtis or Parsons steam turbine; this developed 10,500 ship horsepower (7,800 kW) to drive two 7 ft 6 in (2.29 m) screws. Submerged power came from four electric motors each producing 350 to 360 horsepower (260 to 270 kW). It was also had an 800 hp (600 kW) diesel engine to be used when steam was being raised, or instead of raising steam.

The submarine had a maximum surface speed of 24 kn (44 km/h) and a submerged speed of 9 to 9.5 kn (16.7 to 17.6 km/h). It could operate at depths of 150 ft (46 m) at 2 kn (3.7 km/h) for 80 nmi (150 km). K9 was armed with ten 18-inch (460 mm) torpedo tubes, two 4-inch (100 mm) deck guns, and a 3-inch (76 mm) anti-aircraft gun. Its torpedo tubes were fitted to the bow, the midship section, and two were mounted on the deck. Its complement was fifty-nine crew members.

== Bibliography ==
- Hutchinson, Robert. Submarines, War Beneath The Waves, from 1776 to the Present Day.
