= HMS K14 =

British K Class Submarine

History

United Kingdom
- Name: HMS K14
- Builder: Fairfield Shipbuilding and Engineering Company, Govan
- Laid down: November 1915
- Launched: 8 February 1917
- Commissioned: 22 May 1917
- Fate: Sold, 16 February 1926

General characteristics
- Class & type: K-class submarine
- Displacement: 1,980 long tons (2,010 t) surfaced; 2,566 long tons (2,607 t) submerged
- Length: 339 ft (103 m)
- Beam: 26 ft 6 in (8.08 m)
- Draught: 20 ft 11 in (6.38 m)
- Propulsion: 2 × 10,500 shp (7.8 MW) Brown-Curtis or Parsons geared steam turbines; 2 × Yarrow boilers; 4 × 1,440 hp (1,070 kW) electric motors; 1 × 800 hp (600 kW) Vickers diesel generator for charging batteries on the surface; 2 × 3-blade 7 ft 6 in (2.29 m) diameter screws
- Speed: 24 knots (44 km/h; 28 mph) surfaced; 8 knots (15 km/h; 9.2 mph) submerged
- Range: Surfaced : 800 nmi (1,500 km; 920 mi) at 24 kn (44 km/h; 28 mph); 12,500 nmi (23,200 km; 14,400 mi) at 10 kn (19 km/h; 12 mph); Submerged : 8 nmi (15 km; 9.2 mi) at 8 kn (15 km/h; 9.2 mph); 40 nmi (46 mi; 74 km) at 4 kn (4.6 mph; 7.4 km/h)
- Complement: 59 (6 officers and 53 ratings)
- Armament: 8 × 18 in (460 mm) torpedo tubes, (4 beam, 4 bow); 8 × spare torpedoes; 2 × 18 in torpedo tubes fitted on deck (later removed); 2 × BL 4 in (100 mm) Mk.XI guns; 1 × 3 in (76 mm) gun

HMS K14 was a K class submarine built by Fairfields in Govan, Scotland. She was laid down in November 1915, and commissioned on 22 May 1917.

K14 was part of the Battle of May Island exercise on 31 January 1918, in which her steering jammed while avoiding a collision. She was rammed by K22 behind the forward torpedo compartment, but did not sink, and was repaired. Two men were lost. K14 was sold on 16 February 1926 at Granton.

== Design ==
K14 displaced 1,800 long tons (1,800 t) when at the surface and 2,600 long tons (2,600 t) while submerged. It had a total length of 338 feet (103 m), a beam of 26 feet 6 inches (8.08 m), and a draught of 20 ft 11 in (6.38 m). The submarine was powered by two oil-fired Yarrow Shipbuilders boilers each supplying one geared Brown-Curtis or Parsons steam turbine; this developed 10,500 ship horsepower (7,800 kW) to drive two 7 ft 6 in (2.29 m) screws. Submerged power came from four electric motors each producing 350 to 360 horsepower (260 to 270 kW). It was also had an 800 hp (600 kW) diesel engine to be used when steam was being raised, or instead of raising steam.

The submarine had a maximum surface speed of 24 kn (44 km/h) and a submerged speed of 9 to 9.5 kn (16.7 to 17.6 km/h). It could operate at depths of 150 ft (46 m) at 2 kn (3.7 km/h) for 80 nmi (150 km). K14 was armed with ten 18-inch (460 mm) torpedo tubes, two 4-inch (100 mm) deck guns, and a 3-inch (76 mm) anti-aircraft gun. The torpedo tubes were mounted in the bow, the midship section firing to the beam, and two were on a rotating mounting on the deck. Its complement was fifty-nine crew members.

== Bibliography ==
- Hutchinson, Robert. Submarines, War Beneath The Waves, from 1776 to the Present Day.
