= HMS K17 =

British K Class Submarine

Coordinates: 56°15′N 2°11′W

History

United Kingdom
- Name: HMS K17
- Builder: Vickers, Barrow-in-Furness
- Launched: 10 April 1917
- Commissioned: 1917
- Fate: Sunk after colliding with HMS Fearless, 31 January 1918

General characteristics
- Class & type: K-class submarine
- Displacement: 1,980 long tons (2,010 t) surfaced; 2,566 long tons (2,607 t) submerged
- Length: 339 ft (103 m)
- Beam: 26 ft 6 in (8.08 m)
- Draught: 20 ft 11 in (6.38 m)
- Propulsion: 2 × 10,500 shp (7.8 MW) Brown-Curtis or Parsons geared steam turbines; 2 × Yarrow boilers; 4 × 1,440 hp (1,070 kW) electric motors; 1 × 800 hp (600 kW) Vickers diesel generator for charging batteries on the surface; 2 × 3-blade 7 ft 6 in (2.29 m) diameter screws
- Speed: 24 knots (44 km/h; 28 mph) surfaced; 8 knots (15 km/h; 9.2 mph) submerged
- Range: Surfaced : 800 nmi (1,500 km; 920 mi) at 24 kn (44 km/h; 28 mph); 12,500 nmi (23,200 km; 14,400 mi) at 10 kn (19 km/h; 12 mph); Submerged : 8 nmi (15 km; 9.2 mi) at 8 kn (15 km/h; 9.2 mph); 40 nmi (46 mi; 74 km) at 4 kn (4.6 mph; 7.4 km/h)
- Complement: 59 (6 officers and 53 ratings)
- Armament: 8 × 18 in (460 mm) torpedo tubes, (4 beam, 4 bow); 8 × spare torpedoes; 2 × 18 in torpedo tubes fitted on deck (later removed); 2 × BL 4 in (100 mm) Mk.XI guns; 1 × 3 in (76 mm) gun

HMS K17 was a British K class submarine built by Vickers in Barrow-in-Furness.

== Design ==
Like all British K-class submarines, the submarine had a displacement of 1,980 long tons (2,010 t) when at the surface and 2,566 long tons (2,607 t) while submerged. The boat had a total length of 338 feet (103 m), a beam of 26 feet 6 inches (8.08 m), and a draught of 20 feet 11 inches (6.38 m). The submarine was powered by two oil-fired Yarrow Shipbuilders boilers and one geared Brown-Curtis or Parsons steam turbine; this developed 10,500 ship horsepower (7,800 kW) to drive two 7 feet 6 inches (2.29 m) screws. The hull contained four electric motors each producing 350 to 360 horsepower (260 to 270 kW). The vessel was also fitted with a diesel engine providing 800 horsepower (600 kW) to be used when steam was being generated.

The submarine had a maximum surface speed of 24 knots (44 km/h; 28 mph) and a submerged speed of 9 to 9.5 knots (16.7 to 17.6 km/h; 10.4 to 10.9 mph). The boat could operate at depths of 150 feet (46 m) at 2 knots (3.7 km/h; 2.3 mph) for 80 nautical miles (150 km; 92 mi). The vessels armament comprised a 3 inches (76 mm) anti-aircraft gun, ten 18 inches (460 mm) torpedo tubes, and two 4 inches (100 mm) deck guns. The torpedo tubes were fitted to the bow, the midship section, and two were mounted on the deck. Its complement was fifty-nine crew members.

== Loss ==
K17 was sunk on 31 January 1918 during the night time fleet exercises later known as the Battle of May Island (Operation E.C.1) when she was attached to the 13th Submarine Flotilla. HMS Fearless ploughed into K17 at the head of a line of submarines. She sank in about 8 minutes with the loss of all hands. The wreck is designated as a protected place under the Protection of Military Remains Act 1986.

== Bibliography ==
- Gardiner, Robert; Gray, Randal (1985). Conway's All the World's Fighting Ships 1906–1921. Annapolis, Maryland: Naval Institute Press. ISBN 978-0-87021-907-8.
- Hutchinson, Robert. Submarines, War Beneath The Waves, from 1776 to the Present Day.
