= Henry Hugh Gordon Stoker =

Royal Navy officer, sportsperson and actor (1885–1966)

Henry Stoker
- Born: 2 February 1885; Dublin, Ireland
- Died: 2 February 1966 (aged 81); London, England
- Spouses: Olive Joan Violet Gwendoline Leacock (m. 1908; div. 1919) Dorothie Margaret Pidcock (m. 1925)
- Relatives: Bram Stoker (cousin); Frank Stoker (uncle)
- Military career
- Allegiance: United Kingdom
- Branch: Royal Navy
- Service years: 1900–1920; 1939–1945
- Rank: Captain
- Commands: HMS Minos (1940–42); HMS K9 (1919–20); HMAS AE2 (1914–15); HMS B8 (1911–13); HMS B5 (1910–11); HMS A10 (1909–10)
- Conflicts: First World War: Capture of German New Guinea; Dardanelles campaign; Second World War
- Awards: Distinguished Service Order; Mentioned in Despatches
- Other work: Actor; Theatre director

Captain Henry Hugh Gordon Dacre Stoker, DSO (2 February 1885 – 2 February 1966), also known as Hew Stoker and commonly credited in films as H. G. Stoker or Dacre Stoker, was an Irish actor and Royal Navy officer who commanded the Royal Australian Navy's submarine HMAS AE2 during the First World War. Stoker was captured in 1915 and he spent the remaining three-and-a-half years as a prisoner of war of the Ottoman Empire. He retired from the navy in 1920 to pursue an acting career on the stage and film.

As an amateur athlete, Stoker competed in the Wimbledon tennis championships throughout the 1920s. Following the outbreak of the Second World War, he was recalled to service in the navy, where he helped with public relations. When the war finished, Stoker returned to his acting career. In 1962, at the age of 77, he became Irish Croquet Champion.

== Early life ==
Henry Hugh Gordon Dacre Stoker was born on 2 February 1885 in Dublin to William Stoker (c. 1844–1921), a surgeon, and Jane 'Jeannie' Martin Ross Stoker (née Todd; c. 1849–1935). Stoker was the fourth of six siblings, of which five survived to adulthood.

Stoker's paternal uncle was Frank Stoker, a two-time winner of the Wimbledon Championships Gentlemen's Doubles and an Irish international rugby union player. They were cousins of the author Bram Stoker.

Henry was educated in Dublin; he was an average student but excelled at sport, particularly tennis and rugby.

== Naval career ==
Stoker joined the Royal Navy on 15 January 1900 as a cadet on the training ship HMS Britannia at Dartmouth Harbour. On 30 May 1901, he was promoted to midshipman and posted to HMS Jupiter as part of the Channel Fleet and was later posted to HMS Implacable in the Mediterranean.

On 30 July 1904, Stoker was made a sub-lieutenant and left Implacable to study at the Royal Naval College, Greenwich, after which he volunteered for the new Royal Navy Submarine Service but was posted for a year to HMS Drake in the Western Atlantic before being accepted to submariner training in October 1906. Stoker was promoted to lieutenant on 31 December 1906; he completed his submariner training in October 1907 and was given command of the submarine HMS A10 in January 1909. The following January, he assumed command of HMS B8, which in August 1911 was stationed at Gibraltar.

=== Australian service ===
In 1913, after hearing rumours of a man in Sydney sponsoring men to play polo, Stoker volunteered to be loaned to the Royal Australian Navy (RAN). On 7 November 1913, he was given command of HMAS AE2, which was built at Barrow-in-Furness and commissioned into the RAN at Portsmouth on 28 February 1914. AE2 was accompanied by its sister submarine HMAS AE1, with crews composed of both Royal Navy and RAN personnel, and sailed from England for Australia on 2 March 1914. The first leg, under the escort of HMS Eclipse, arrived at Colombo, on 9 April. The second leg, with an escort provided by HMS Yarmouth, arrived in Singapore on 21 April. The final leg was completed under escort of HMAS Sydney and arrived in Sydney on 24 May, completing a voyage of 13,000 nautical miles (15,000 mi; 24,000 km), the longest voyage recorded by a submarine up to that time.

==== First World War ====
Following the outbreak of the First World War in August 1914, AE1 and AE2 joined the Australian Naval and Military Expeditionary Force to capture the German colony New Guinea. The German territories surrendering on 22 September; AE2 patrolled the sea around Fiji and returned to Sydney for maintenance on 16 November.

AE2 departed Sydney on 19 December to meet up with the second convoy of Australian Imperial Force (AIF) in Albany, Western Australia. She joined the convoy to Suez, completing most of it under tow. Stoker was promoted to lieutenant commander on 31 December 1914. On 28 January 1915, AE2 arrived at Suez, where it joined the Mediterranean Fleet, which operated in support of the Dardanelles campaign. To Vice-Admiral John de Robeck, Stoker presented plans for his submarine to force a passage through the heavily defended Dardanelles Strait, and enter the Sea of Marmara and disrupt shipping, which would make supply and reinforcement of the enemy more difficult.

On 25 April 1915, Stoker took AE2 through the 47-mile (75 km) strait and entered the Sea of Marmara, the first allied submarine to do so. Other submarines soon followed. On 30 April, while attempting to rendezvous with HMS E14, AE2 was damaged by the Ottoman torpedo boat Sultanhisar while on the surface, after which AE2 was no longer able to dive, and Stoker was forced to surrender and scuttle her.

Stoker spent the rest of the war a prisoner of war (POW) in the Ottoman Empire. He made three unsuccessful attempts to escape, but spent the majority of his time entertaining other POWs. He was repatriated to England in December 1918 and reverted back to Royal Navy service on 9 February 1919. He was awarded the Distinguished Service Order on 22 April 1919 "In recognition of his gallantry in making the passage of the Dardanelles in command of HM Australian Submarine AE2 on 25 April 1915". On 17 October 1919 he was mentioned in despatches "For valuable services in HM Australian Submarine AE2 in the prosecution of the war".

On 10 February 1919, Stoker was given command of HMS K9. He was promoted to commander on 31 December 1919. In 1920 he was offered command of submarine depot vessel HMS Royal Arthur, but instead chose to resign and was put on the retired list on 2 October 1920.

=== Second World War ===
In 1939, at the outbreak of the Second World War, Stoker was recalled to service in the Royal Navy. He was given the rank of acting captain and was chief of staff to Rear-Admiral Richard Matthew King, commander at Belfast-based HMS Caroline. In August 1940, Stoker was given command of HMS Minos, an onshore base at the Port of Lowestoft.

In July 1942, Stoker was assigned as a public relations officer with the Admiralty Press Division. In April 1944, he was a staff officer with the Supreme Headquarters Allied Expeditionary Force but after the Normandy landings, he returned to his previous role in the Admiralty. Stoker again retired from the navy with the rank of captain in late 1945.

== Sporting career ==
Stoker was an avid sportsman who as a schoolboy was proficient at tennis and rugby. He volunteered to serve on RAN’s submarine after hearing a false rumour of sponsorship to play polo in Sydney, Australia.

Competing under the name Hew Stoker, he entered the 1920 Wimbledon Championships, losing in the first round to former finalist and doubles champion Major Ritchie. In the following year's Wimbledon Championship, Stoker reached the third round, beating L. Andrews in the first and Arthur Wallis Myers in the second, losing to eventual finalist Manuel Alonso Areizaga. At the 1922 Championship at Wimbledon, Stoker defeated Sydney Watts in the first round but lost to Cecil Tindell-Green in the second. Stoker again made the second round at the 1923 Wimbledon Championships, beating Alexander Blair and losing to H.A. Carless. Stoker made the second round in 1924, winning against Brian Helmore and losing to Sydney Jacob. In 1925 Stoker lost in the first round to John Pennycuick. Stoker's final entry to Wimbledon came in 1927, when he lost his first-round match against William Powell.

Stoker continued his involvement in sport; he served as president of the Royal Navy Lawn Tennis Association between 1953 and 1963. In 1962, at the age of 77, he became Croquet Singles Champion of Ireland.

== Family life and legacy ==
Stoker was married twice; his first wife was Olive Joan Violet Gwendoline Leacock, daughter of Colonel Schuler Leacock of the Bengal Cavalry. The marriage ended in divorce when Stoker, after returning to England following service with the RAN and being a prisoner of war in the Ottoman Empire, discovered she had given birth to three children in his absence. In 1925, Stoker published an autobiography called Straws in the Wind; the same year, he married actor Dorothie Margaret Pidcock, to whom he remained married until his death on his 81st birthday, 2 February 1966.

With the introduction of a separate Australian Honours system, there has been debate about whether Stoker should be awarded the Victoria Cross for Australia for his service as commander of AE2 during the Dardanelles campaign.

The Australian submarine rescue vessel MV Stoker is named in his honour. The sister ship, MV Besant, is named for the commanding officer of HMAS AE1, Lieutenant Commander Thomas Besant.

== Filmography ==
=== Film ===
Year	Title	Role	Notes	Ref.
1933	One Precious Year	Sir John Rome	Credited as H.G. Stoker	
1933	Channel Crossing	Captain	Credited as H.G. Stoker	
1934	The Warren Case		Credited as H.G. Stoker	
1934	The Man Who Knew Too Much			
1935	Brown on Resolution	Captain Holt	Credited as H.G. Stoker	
1935	Koenigsmark		Uncredited	
1936	Pot Luck	Davey	Credited as H.G. Stoker	
1936	The First Offence	Dr G.E. Penrose	Credited as H.G. Stoker	
1936	It's You I Want	Braille	Credited as H.G. Stoker	
1937	Non-Stop New York	Captain	Credited as H.G. Stoker	
1937	Moonlight Sonata	Club Member (uncredited)		
1938	Crackerjack	Supt. Benting	Credited as H.G. Stoker	
1940	Full Speed Ahead	Sir Robert Barrymore		
1948	It's Hard to Be Good	Elderly Man (uncredited)		
1948	Woman Hater	Old Boy at club (uncredited)		
1948	Brighton Rock	Registrar (uncredited)		
1948	Call of the Blood	Uncle Ben (uncredited)		
1951	Four Days	Baxter	Credited as H.G. Stoker	
1952	Where's Charley?	Wilkinson		

=== Television ===
Year	Title	Role	Notes	Ref.
1946	I Want to Be an Actor	Narrator	TV movie. Credited as H.G. Stoker	
1946	Adventure Story	Dr. Lane	TV play. Credited as H.G. Stoker	
1947	Toad of Toad Hall	The Storyteller	TV play. Credited as H.G. Stoker	
1948	Morning Departure	Captain Marshall, D.S.O., R.N.	TV play. Credited as H.G. Stoker	
1948	The Middle Watch	Admiral Sir Hercules Hewitt, K.C.B.	Credited as H.G. Stoker	
1948	Celestial Fire	The General, G.O.C., A.A. Command	Credited as H.G. Stoker	
1949	Deep Waters	The Admiral	Co-written with Gilbert Hackforth-Jones. Credited as H.G. Stoker	
1949	Radiolympia: Old Songs for New	The boy of yesterday	Credited as H.G. Stoker	
1949	Counsel's Opinion	Willock	Credited as H.G. Stoker	
1950	Mr. Gillie	The Judge	TV movie. Credited as H.G. Stoker	
1950	The Switchback	Sir Anthony Craye Bart., K.C.V.O., F.R.C.S.	TV movie. Credited as H.G. Stoker	
1951	Sherlock Holmes	Colonel Hayter	The Reigate Squires. Credited as H.G. Stoker	
1952	My Wife Jacqueline	General Bridger	The Agonies of Courtship and Happily Ever After. Credited as H.G. Stoker	
1953	The Disagreeable Man	His Honour Judge Strachan	Credited as H.G. Stoker	
1955	Alfred Hitchcock Presents	Dr. Senior	The Case of Mr. Pelham. Credited as H.G. Stoker	
1959	Armchair Theatre		Star in the Summer Night. Credited as H.G. Stoker	
1961	Element of Doubt		TV play. Credited as H.G. Stoker	

=== Radio ===
Year	Title	Role	Notes	Ref.
1930	Red Tabs		Radio play. Credited as H.G. Stoker	
