= HMS B7 =

British B-class submarine

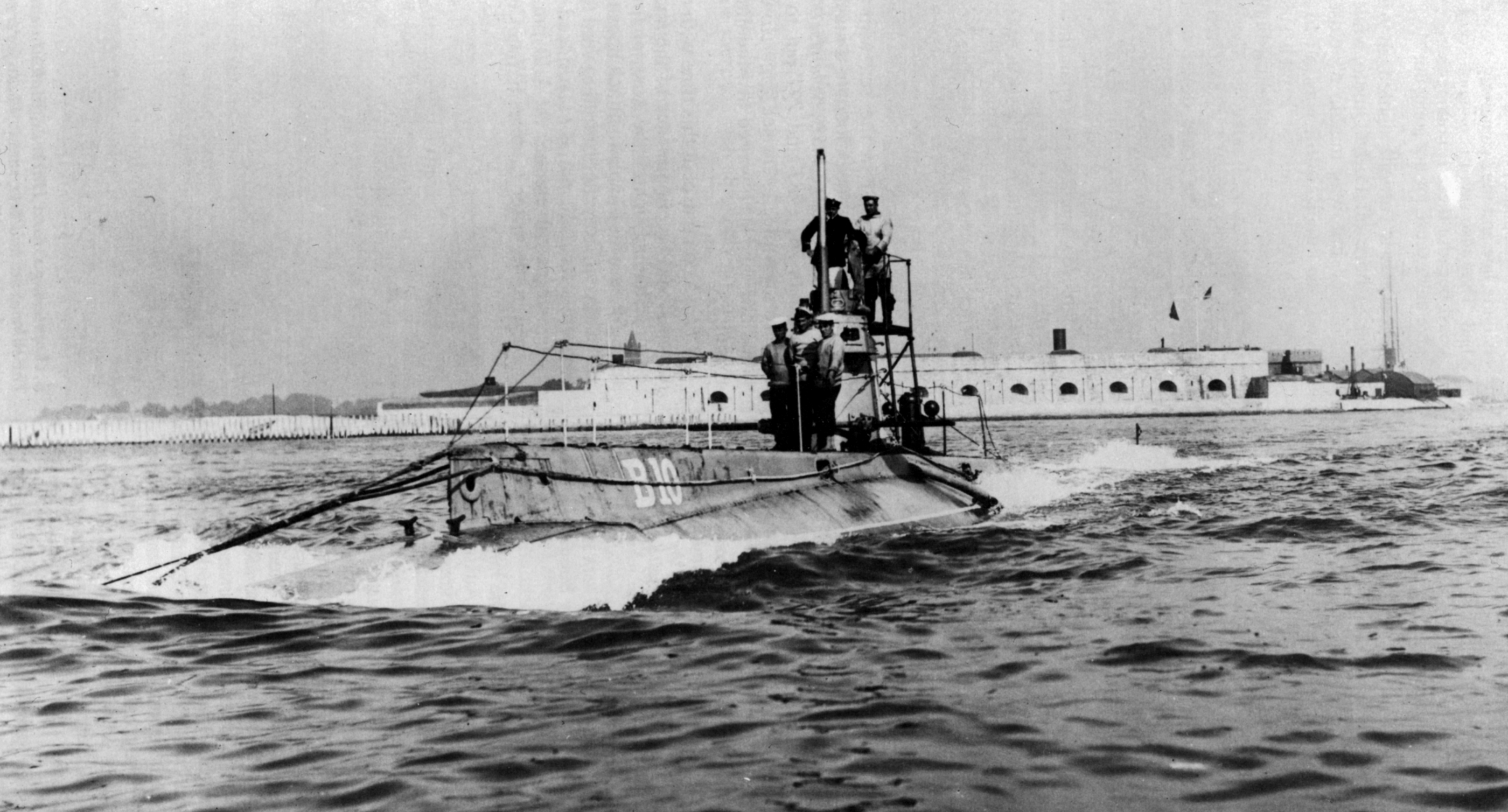
- Sister ship B10 in the Solent, between 1906 and 1912

History

United Kingdom
- Name: B7
- Ordered: 1904–1905 Naval Programme
- Builder: Vickers
- Cost: £47,000
- Launched: 30 November 1905
- Completed: 27 March 1906
- Fate: Sold for scrap, 1919

General characteristics
- Class & type: B-class submarine
- Displacement: 287 long tons (292 t) (surfaced); 316 long tons (321 t) (submerged)
- Length: 142 ft 3 in (43.4 m)
- Beam: 12 ft 7 in (3.8 m)
- Draught: 11 ft 2 in (3.4 m)
- Installed power: 600 bhp (447 kW) (petrol); 180 hp (134 kW) (electric)
- Propulsion: 1 × 16-cylinder Vickers petrol engine; 1 × electric motor
- Speed: 12 knots (22 km/h; 14 mph) (surfaced); 6.5 knots (12.0 km/h; 7.5 mph) (submerged)
- Range: 1,000 nmi (1,900 km; 1,200 mi) at 8.7 knots (16.1 km/h; 10.0 mph) on the surface
- Test depth: 100 feet (30.5 m)
- Complement: 2 officers and 13 ratings
- Armament: 2 × 18 in (450 mm) bow torpedo tubes

HMS B7 was one of 11 B-class submarines built for the Royal Navy in the first decade of the 20th century. Completed in 1906, she was initially assigned to the Home Fleet, before the boat was transferred to the Mediterranean six years later. After the First World War began in 1914, B7 played a minor role in the Dardanelles Campaign. The boat was transferred to the Adriatic Sea in 1916 to support Italian forces against the Austro-Hungarian Navy. She was converted into a patrol boat in 1917 and was sold for scrap in 1919.

== Design and description ==
The B class was an enlarged and improved version of the preceding A class. The submarines had a length of 142 feet 3 inches (43.4 m) overall, a beam of 12 feet 7 inches (3.8 m) and a mean draught of 11 feet 2 inches (3.4 m). They displaced 287 long tons (292 t) on the surface and 316 long tons (321 t) submerged. The boats had could dive to a depth of 100 feet (30.5 m). The B-class submarines had a crew of two officers and thirteen ratings.

For surface running, the boats were powered by a single 16-cylinder 600-brake-horsepower (447 kW) Vickers petrol engine that drove one propeller shaft. When submerged the propeller was driven by a 180-horsepower (134 kW) electric motor. They could reach 12 knots (22 km/h; 14 mph) on the surface and 6.5 knots (12.0 km/h; 7.5 mph) underwater. On the surface, the B class had a range of 1,000 nautical miles (1,900 km; 1,200 mi) at 8.7 knots (16.1 km/h; 10.0 mph).

The boats were armed with two 18-inch (450 mm) torpedo tubes in the bow. They could carry a pair of reload torpedoes, but generally did not as they would have to remove an equal weight of fuel in compensation.

== Construction and career ==
Ordered as part of the 1904–1905 Naval Programme, B7 was built by Vickers at their Barrow-in-Furness shipyard. She was launched on 30 November 1905 and completed on 27 March 1906 at a cost of £47,000. The B-class submarines were initially assigned to the Third Division of the Home Fleet, based at Portsmouth and Devonport, and were tasked with coastal-defence duties and defending the Straits of Dover in wartime. In 1912, HMS B7, HMS B6 and HMS B8 were transferred to Malta.

After the start of the First World War and the unsuccessful pursuit of the German ships Goeben and Breslau in August 1914, the B-class submarines were transferred to the Dardanelles area in mid-September to prevent any breakout attempt by the German ships. After the arrival of the larger and more modern E-class submarines in early 1915, the B-class boats began to return to Malta. After the Kingdom of Italy joined the Allies in May 1915, the B-class submarines in the Mediterranean were transferred to Venice to reinforce Italian forces in the northern Adriatic. B7, B8 and B9 were the first to arrive in Venice on 11 October. The five British submarines made a total of 13 patrols off the Austro-Hungarian coast before the end of 1915, hampered by bad weather and drifting mines.

B7 was ordered to Malta for a refit at the beginning of 1916, which lasted until May, when the boat made two patrols. On 4 June she was patrolling off Pola with only her conning tower above water when she was attacked by two Austro-Hungarian Lohner L flying boats. As the boat crash dived a bomb blew in the glass portholes in the conning tower, flooding it and sending B7 below 100 feet before she could recover and surface to drain the conning tower. The bomb had also jammed the diving planes in the rise position. The jam was cleared as another flying boat dropped five small bombs near the submarine as she was diving, but failed to do any damage. As she was returning to Venice the following day, her engine broke down and B7 had to be towed into Chioggia for repairs. They were not satisfactory and she had to be towed to Venice on the 6th. Replaced by more modern H-class submarines, the B-class boats returned to Malta on 9 November to be converted into surface patrol boats, armed with a 12-pounder (3 in (76 mm)) gun. Redesignated as S7 in August 1917, the boat was assigned to patrol the Otranto Barrage that was intended to prevent the Austro-Hungarian Navy from breaking out of the Adriatic, although she proved to be very unreliable in service. Paid off at Malta, she was sold for scrap in 1919.
