= HMS B8 =

British B-class submarine

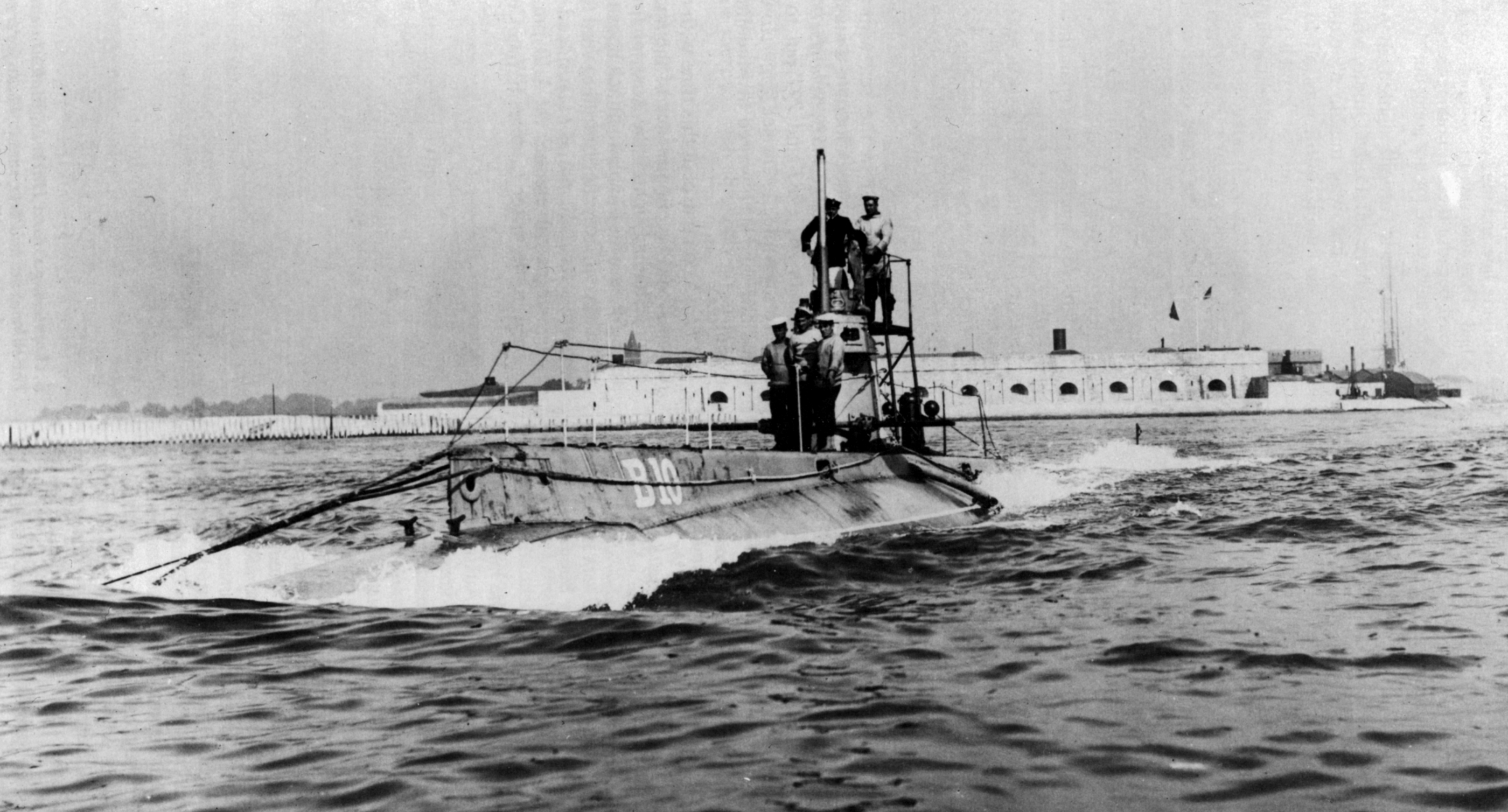
- Sister ship B10 in the Solent, between 1906 and 1912

History

United Kingdom
- Name: B8
- Ordered: 1904–1905 Naval Programme
- Builder: Vickers
- Cost: £47,000
- Launched: 23 January 1906
- Completed: 10 April 1906
- Fate: Sold for scrap, 1919

General characteristics
- Class & type: B-class submarine
- Displacement: 287 long tons (292 t) (surfaced); 316 long tons (321 t) (submerged)
- Length: 142 ft 3 in (43.4 m)
- Beam: 12 ft 7 in (3.8 m)
- Draught: 11 ft 2 in (3.4 m)
- Installed power: 600 bhp (447 kW) petrol; 180 hp (134 kW) electric
- Propulsion: 1 × 16-cylinder Vickers petrol engine; 1 × electric motor
- Speed: 12 knots (22 km/h; 14 mph) (surfaced); 6.5 knots (12.0 km/h; 7.5 mph) (submerged)
- Range: 1,000 nmi (1,900 km; 1,200 mi) at 8.7 kn (16.1 km/h; 10.0 mph) on the surface
- Test depth: 100 feet (30.5 m)
- Complement: 2 officers and 13 ratings
- Armament: 2 × 18 in (450 mm) bow torpedo tubes

HMS B8 was one of 11 B-class submarines built for the Royal Navy in the first decade of the 20th century. Completed in 1906, she was initially assigned to the Home Fleet, before the boat was transferred to the Mediterranean six years later. After the First World War began in 1914, B8 played a minor role in the Dardanelles Campaign. The boat was transferred to the Adriatic Sea in 1916 to support Italian forces against the Austro-Hungarian Navy. She was converted into a patrol boat in 1917 and was sold for scrap in 1919.

== Design and description ==
The B class was an enlarged and improved version of the preceding A class. The submarines had a length of 142 feet 3 inches (43.4 m) overall, a beam of 12 feet 7 inches (3.8 m) and a mean draught of 11 feet 2 inches (3.4 m). They displaced 287 long tons (292 t) on the surface and 316 long tons (321 t) submerged. The boats could dive to a depth of 100 feet (30.5 m). The B-class submarines had a crew of two officers and thirteen ratings.

For surface running, the boats were powered by a single 16-cylinder 600-brake-horsepower (447 kW) Vickers petrol engine that drove one propeller shaft. When submerged the propeller was driven by a 180-horsepower (134 kW) electric motor. They could reach 12 knots (22 km/h; 14 mph) on the surface and 6.5 knots (12.0 km/h; 7.5 mph) underwater. On the surface, the B class had a range of 1,000 nautical miles (1,900 km; 1,200 mi) at 8.7 knots (16.1 km/h; 10.0 mph).

The boats were armed with two 18-inch (450 mm) torpedo tubes in the bow. They could carry a pair of reload torpedoes, but generally did not as they would have to remove an equal weight of fuel in compensation.

== Construction and career ==
Ordered as part of the 1904–1905 Naval Programme, B8 was built by Vickers at their Barrow-in-Furness shipyard. She was launched on 23 January 1906 and completed on 10 April at a cost of £47,000. The B-class submarines were initially assigned to the Third Division of the Home Fleet, based at Portsmouth and Devonport, and were tasked with coastal-defence duties and defending the Straits of Dover in wartime. On 26 April 1906, B8 ran aground on a mud bank off the entrance to Haslar creek, near Portsmouth. She was floated off at high tide early the next day without sustaining any damage. In 1912, HMS B8, HMS B6 and HMS B7 were transferred to Malta.

After the start of the First World War and the unsuccessful pursuit of the German ships Goeben and Breslau in August 1914, the B-class submarines were transferred to the Dardanelles area in mid-September to prevent any breakout attempt by the German ships. After the arrival of the larger and more modern E-class submarines in early 1915, the B-class boats began to return to Malta. After the Kingdom of Italy joined the Allies in May 1915, the B-class submarines in the Mediterranean were transferred to Venice to reinforce Italian forces in the northern Adriatic. B8, B7 and B9 were the first to arrive in Venice on 11 October, although B8 was immediately sent to the dockyard to repair damage suffered when she collided with the Italian tugboat Luni. B8 was the first British submarine in the Adriatic to sight an enemy warship when she spotted an Austro-Hungarian destroyer off the Istrian coast on 8 November, although she was unable to attack it. The five British submarines made a total of 13 patrols off the Austro-Hungarian coast before the end of 1915, hampered by bad weather and drifting mines, followed by 13 more in the first two months of 1916.

B8 reported spotting a periscope and being missed by a torpedo while beginning a patrol on 28 February; postwar research has revealed that no enemy submarines were in the area where in the incident occurred. By 27 April the boat was being refitted at Venice. After its completion in early May, the boat began her first patrol of the month on the 23rd. She was attacked by the Austro-Hungarian submarine U-11; the latter's torpedo missed when B8 dived upon spotting U-11's periscope. On 9 August B8 was slightly damaged when a bomb struck and sank her sister B10 at her moorings. Replaced by more modern H-class submarines, the B-class boats returned to Malta on 9 November to be converted into surface patrol boats, armed with a 12-pounder (3 in (76 mm)) gun. Redesignated as S8 in August 1917, the boat was assigned to patrol the Otranto Barrage that was intended to prevent the Austro-Hungarian Navy from breaking out of the Adriatic, although she proved to be very unreliable in service. Paid off at Malta, she was sold for scrap in 1919.
