= HMS B3 =

Submarine of the Royal Navy

History

United Kingdom
- Name: HMS B3
- Builder: Vickers
- Launched: 31 October 1905
- Completed: 19 January 1906
- Fate: Sold for scrap, 20 December 1919

General characteristics
- Class & type: B-class submarine
- Displacement: 287 long tons (292 t) surfaced; 316 long tons (321 t) submerged
- Length: 142 ft 3 in (43.4 m)
- Beam: 12 ft 7 in (3.8 m)
- Draught: 11 ft 2 in (3.4 m)
- Installed power: 600 bhp (450 kW) petrol; 180 hp (130 kW) electric
- Propulsion: 1 × 16-cylinder Vickers petrol engine; 1 × electric motor
- Speed: 12 kn (22 km/h; 14 mph) surfaced; 6.5 kn (12.0 km/h; 7.5 mph) submerged
- Range: 1,000 nmi (1,900 km; 1,200 mi) at 8.7 kn (16.1 km/h; 10.0 mph) on the surface
- Test depth: 100 feet (30.5 m)
- Complement: 2 officers and 13 ratings
- Armament: 2 × 18 in (450 mm) bow torpedo tubes

HMS B3 was one of 11 B-class submarines built for the Royal Navy in the first decade of the 20th century. The boat survived the First World War and was sold for scrap in 1919.

== Design and description ==
The B class was an enlarged and improved version of the preceding A class. The submarines had a length of 142 feet 3 inches (43.4 m) overall, a beam of 12 feet 7 inches (3.8 m) and a mean draught of 11 feet 2 inches (3.4 m). They displaced 287 long tons (292 t) on the surface and 316 long tons (321 t) submerged. The B-class submarines had a crew of two officers and thirteen ratings.

For surface running, the boats were powered by a single 16-cylinder 600-brake-horsepower (447 kW) Vickers petrol engine that drove one propeller shaft. When submerged the propeller was driven by a 180-horsepower (134 kW) electric motor. They could reach 12 knots (22 km/h; 14 mph) on the surface and 6.5 knots (12.0 km/h; 7.5 mph) underwater. On the surface, the B class had a range of 1,000 nautical miles (1,900 km; 1,200 mi) at 8.7 knots (16.1 km/h; 10.0 mph).

The boats were armed with two 18-inch (450 mm) torpedo tubes in the bow. They could carry a pair of reload torpedoes, but generally did not as they would have to remove an equal weight of fuel in compensation.

== Construction and career ==
B3 was laid down by Vickers at their Barrow-in-Furness shipyard, launched 31 October 1905 and completed 19 January 1906. When the war began in 1914, the boat was assigned to defend the Straits of Dover and was then transferred to Scotland in 1915 to defend various ports there. B3 was sold for scrap on 20 December 1919.
