= HMS B2 =

B-class submarine built for the Royal Navy

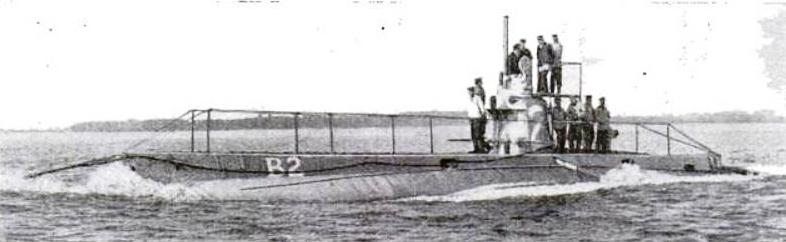
- HMS B2

History

United Kingdom
- Name: HMS B2
- Builder: Vickers
- Launched: 30 October 1905
- Completed: 9 December 1905
- Fate: Lost, 4 October 1912

General characteristics
- Class & type: B-class submarine
- Displacement: 287 long tons (292 t) surfaced; 316 long tons (321 t) submerged
- Length: 142 ft 3 in (43.4 m)
- Beam: 12 ft 7 in (3.8 m)
- Draught: 11 ft 2 in (3.4 m)
- Installed power: 600 bhp (450 kW) petrol; 180 hp (130 kW) electric
- Propulsion: 1 × 16-cylinder Vickers petrol engine; 1 × electric motor
- Speed: 12 kn (22 km/h; 14 mph) surfaced; 6.5 kn (12.0 km/h; 7.5 mph) submerged
- Range: 1,000 nmi (1,900 km; 1,200 mi) at 8.7 kn (16.1 km/h; 10.0 mph) on the surface
- Test depth: 100 feet (30.5 m)
- Complement: 2 officers and 13 ratings
- Armament: 2 × 18 in (450 mm) bow torpedo tubes

HMS B2 was one of 11 B-class submarines built for the Royal Navy in the first decade of the 20th century.

== Design and description ==
The B class was an enlarged and improved version of the preceding A class. The submarines had a length of 142 feet 3 inches (43.4 m) overall, a beam of 12 feet 7 inches (3.8 m) and a mean draught of 11 feet 2 inches (3.4 m). They displaced 287 long tons (292 t) on the surface and 316 long tons (321 t) submerged. The B-class submarines had a crew of two officers and thirteen ratings.

For surface running, the boats were powered by a single 16-cylinder 600-brake-horsepower (447 kW) Vickers petrol engine that drove one propeller shaft. When submerged the propeller was driven by a 180-horsepower (134 kW) electric motor. They could reach 12 knots (22 km/h; 14 mph) on the surface and 6.5 knots (12.0 km/h; 7.5 mph) underwater. On the surface, the B class had a range of 1,000 nautical miles (1,900 km; 1,200 mi) at 8.7 knots (16.1 km/h; 10.0 mph).

The boats were armed with two 18-inch (450 mm) torpedo tubes in the bow. They could carry a pair of reload torpedoes, but generally did not as they would have to remove an equal weight of fuel in compensation.

== Construction and career ==
B2 was built by Vickers at their Barrow-in-Furness shipyard, launched on 30 October 1905 and completed on 9 December 1905. The boat was lost when she accidentally collided with SS Amerika 4 mi (6.4 km) northeast of Dover in the early hours of 4 October 1912. She was commanded by Lieutenant P.B. O’Brien and was one of several submarines sent to Dover to take part in Channel exercises during the extended lead up to the First World War. B2 was surfaced and was struck just forward of the conning tower. The accident resulted in the deaths of 15 crew members. The only survivor was the boat's bridge officer, Lt. Pulleyne. The boat was not recovered in order to allow the bodies to remain undisturbed. In recent years the wreck was discovered by amateur divers.
