= HMS B11 =

Submarine of the Royal Navy

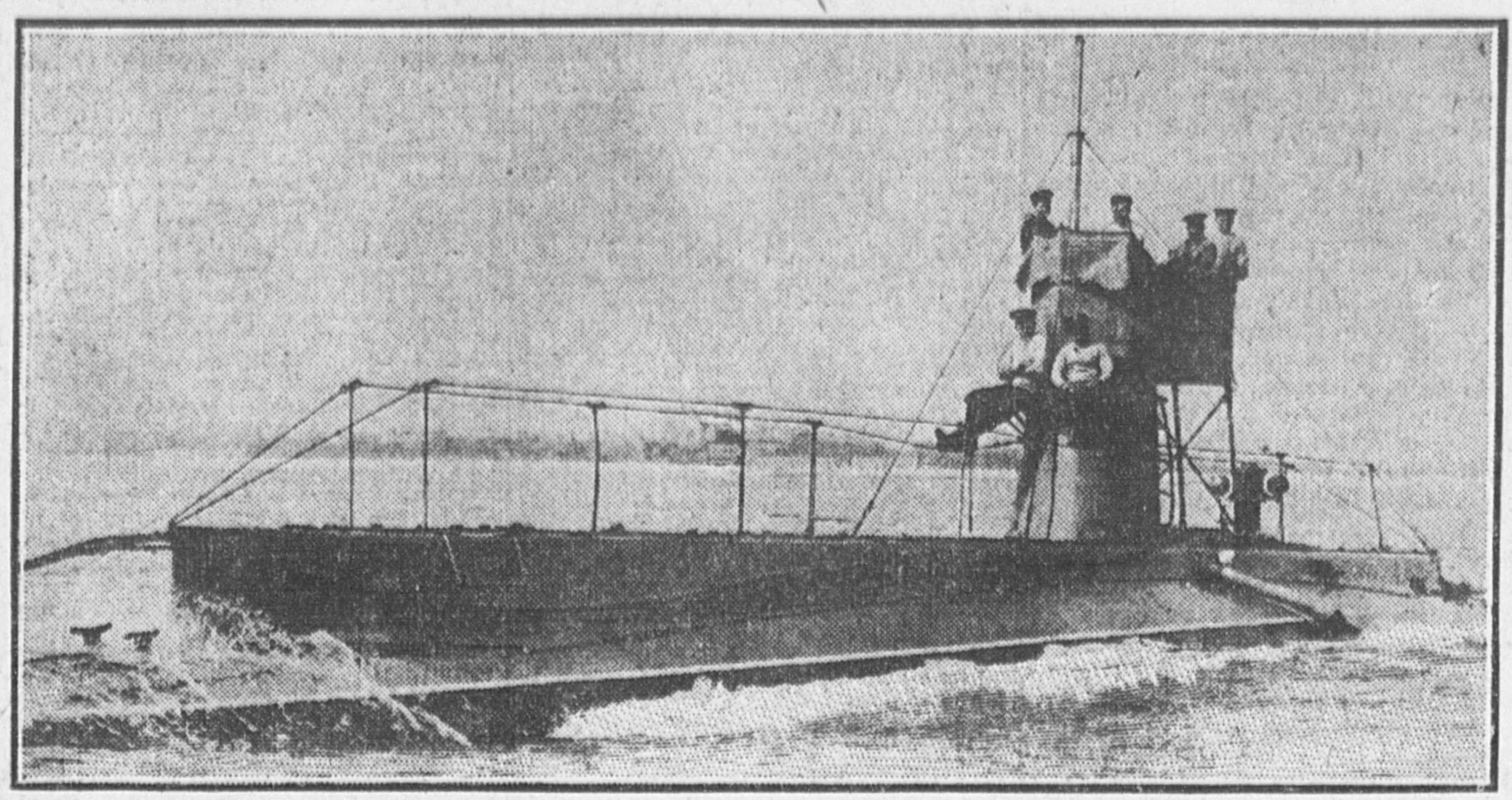
- B11 with crew in 1914

History

United Kingdom
- Name: B11
- Builder: Vickers
- Launched: 21 February 1906
- Completed: 11 July 1906
- Fate: Sold for scrap, 1919

General characteristics
- Class & type: B-class submarine
- Displacement: 287 long tons (292 t) surfaced; 316 long tons (321 t) submerged
- Length: 142 ft 3 in (43.4 m)
- Beam: 12 ft 7 in (3.8 m)
- Draught: 11 ft 2 in (3.4 m)
- Installed power: 600 bhp (447 kW) petrol; 180 hp (130 kW) electric
- Propulsion: 1 × petrol engine; 1 × electric motor
- Speed: 12 knots (22 km/h; 14 mph) (surfaced); 6.5 knots (12.0 km/h; 7.5 mph) (submerged)
- Range: 1,000 nmi (1,900 km; 1,200 mi) at 8.7 knots (16.1 km/h; 10.0 mph) on the surface
- Test depth: 100 feet (30.5 m)
- Complement: 2 officers and 13 ratings
- Armament: 2 × 18 in (450 mm) bow torpedo tubes

HMS B11 was the last of 11 B-class submarines built for the Royal Navy in the first decade of the 20th century. Completed in 1906, it is best known for carrying out a successful attack on the Ottoman ironclad Mesûdiye in the Dardanelles, an action for which her captain received the Victoria Cross. It spent the remainder of its active life serving in the Mediterranean, being converted into a surface patrol boat late in the war. B11 was sold for scrap in 1919.

== Design and description ==
The B class was an enlarged and improved version of the preceding A class. The submarines had a length of 142 feet 3 inches (43.4 m) overall, a beam of 12 feet 7 inches (3.8 m) and a mean draught of 11 feet 2 inches (3.4 m). They displaced 287 long tons (292 t) on the surface and 316 long tons (321 t) submerged. The B-class submarines had a crew of two officers and thirteen ratings.

For surface running, the boats were powered by a single 16-cylinder 600-brake-horsepower (447 kW) Vickers petrol engine that drove one propeller shaft. When submerged the propeller was driven by a 180-horsepower (134 kW) electric motor. They could reach 12 knots (22 km/h; 14 mph) on the surface and 6.5 knots (12.0 km/h; 7.5 mph) underwater. On the surface, the B class had a range of 1,000 nautical miles (1,900 km; 1,200 mi) at 8.7 knots (16.1 km/h; 10.0 mph).

The boats were armed with two 18-inch (450 mm) torpedo tubes in the bow. They could carry a pair of reload torpedoes, but generally did not as they would have to remove an equal weight of fuel in compensation.

== Pre-war career ==
The submarine was constructed by Vickers in Barrow and was launched on 21 February 1906. Fitting out was completed 11 July the same year. Along with HMS B9 and HMS B10 the submarine was deployed to Malta in 1912.

== World War I service ==
=== Patrolling off the Dardanelles ===
In September 1914 the submarine was redeployed to Tenedos join the fleet watching the entrance of the Dardanelles. Later in 1914 while on patrol off the Dardanelles, B11 chased a torpedo boat for 4 miles up the strait.

In April 1915 after HMS E15 ran aground off Kephez point, B11 was one of a number of boats that failed in their attempts to destroy the wreck. On 20 May the boat sighted SM UB-8 while on patrol off the Gulf of Smyrna. The submarine attempted to attack but was spotted and UB-8 then dived before escaping.

==== Attack on the Mesudiye ====
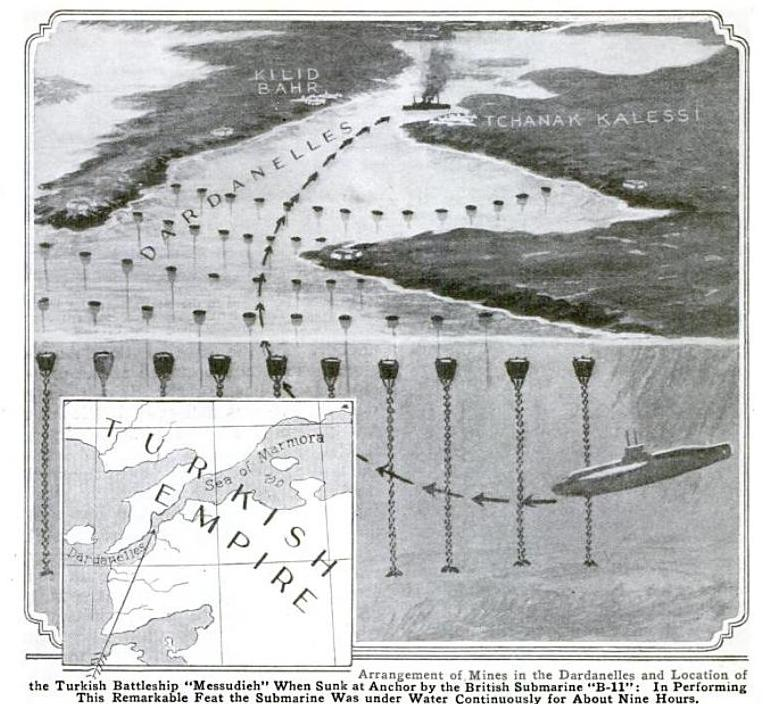
Overview of the Dardanelle raid leading to the sinking of the Mesûdiye

On 13 December 1914, B11, commanded by Lieutenant Norman Douglas Holbrook, entered the Dardanelles and torpedoed the Ottoman battleship Mesûdiye. The submarine had been selected for the mission over HMS B9 and HMS B10 due to having been fitted with a new battery. The French boats at the submarine base had been rejected as it was agreed that they were less suitable than the British submarines. Guards were constructed over the various projections on the submarine's hull to reduce the risk of snagging on mines.

B11 started its journey from Tenedos. Before the submarine reached the first row of mines it was discovered that one of the guards had become damaged making it worse than useless. The guard was removed and the attack continued. The boat then had to pass under five rows of mines through then uncharted currents. Passing through the minefield took about five hours. After B11 hit Mesûdiye it took eight hours for the submarine to escape initially with any attempt to use the periscope resulting in heavy fire.

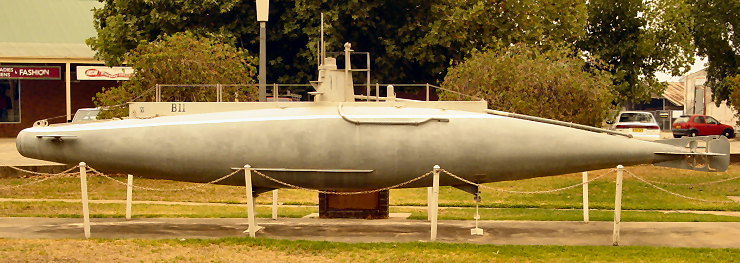
A scale model of B11 in Holbrook, NSW

Lt. Holbrook was awarded the Victoria Cross, the first for service in a submarine, his First Lieutenant, Sydney Winn, was awarded the Distinguished Service Order, and every member of the crew was awarded the Distinguished Service Medal. On 24 July 1916 the Prize court decided that the submarine's company was entitled to prize money for the sinking of Mesûdiye, and an award of £3,500 was made, of which Holbrook received £601 10s 2d, Winn £481 4s 2d, chief petty officers £240 12s 1d, and seamen £120 6s 1d. This represented three years' pay for a seaman. On 24 August 1915 the town of Germanton in New South Wales, Australia, was renamed "Holbrook" in his honour and a replica of B11 can be seen there.

=== Move to Venice ===
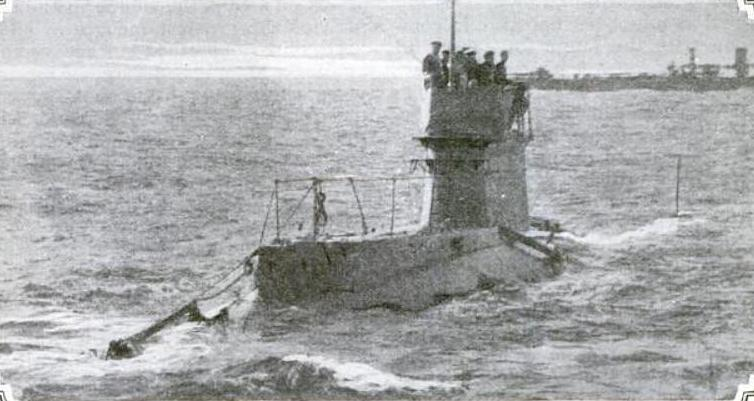
HMS B11 under way with decks awash

The submarine was relocated from Malta to Venice in October 1915 arriving on the 28th. On 11 December of the same year the submarine under the command of Lieutenant Samuel Gravener was engaged by an Austrian flying boat. The attack was unsuccessful and the plane suffered engine failure forcing it to land. Gravener attempted attack the plane with a Maxim gun but it jammed and the plane was able to take off again before the submarine could ram it.

On 17 January 1916 the submarine managed to capture the crew of an Austrian flying boat after the aircraft had suffered engine failure while returning from a bombing raid. On 17 March she was narrowly missed by a torpedo but was unable to locate the attacker. Later in the war B11 was converted to a surface patrol boat by raising the deck level and removing the electric motor. In addition the conning tower was replaced by a wheelhouse. B11 was sold for scrap in 1919 in Italy.
