= HMS B6 =

Submarine of the Royal Navy

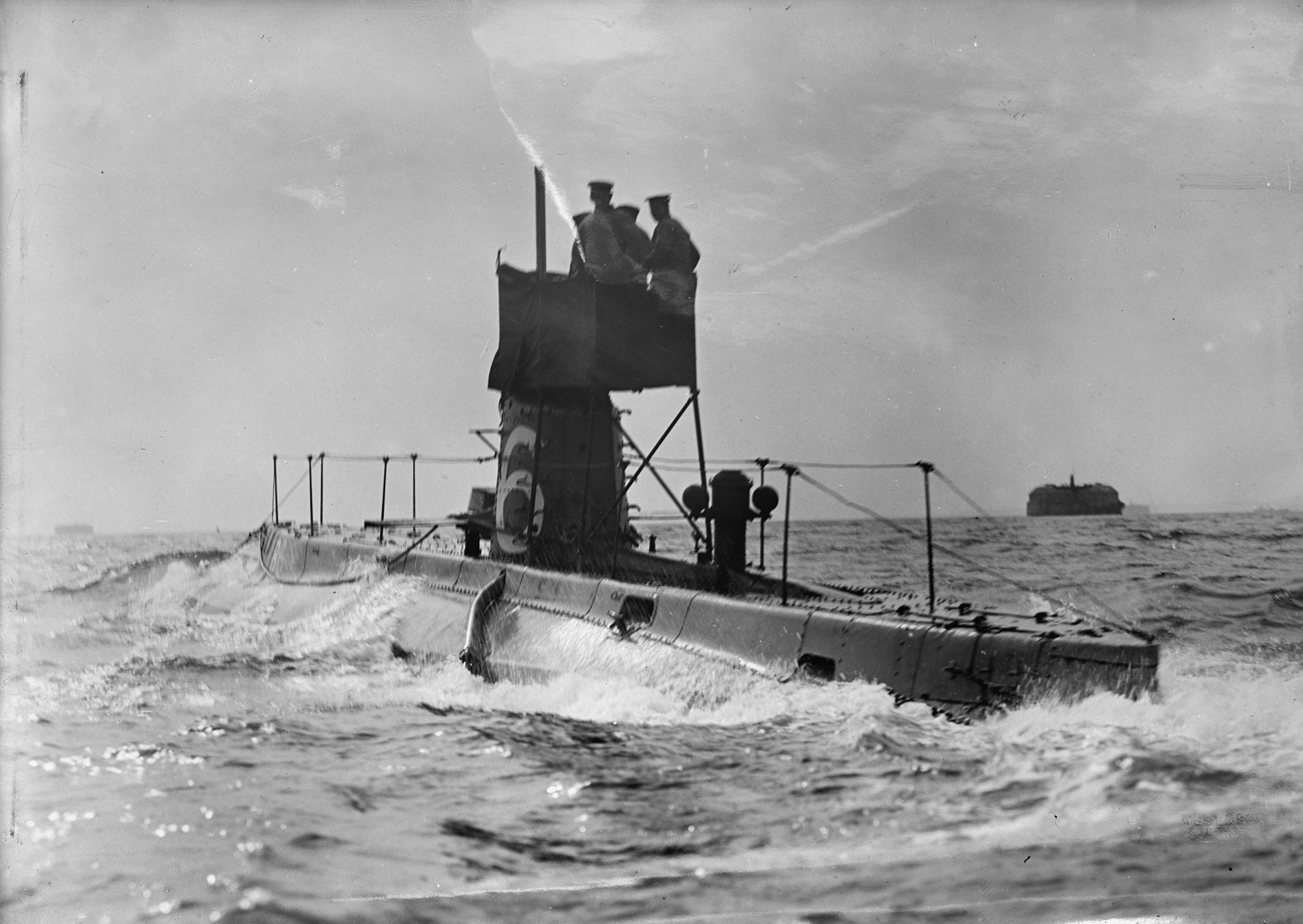
- HMS B6 in the Solent

History

United Kingdom
- Name: HMS B6
- Builder: Vickers
- Launched: 30 November 1905
- Completed: 3 March 1906
- Fate: Sold for scrap, 1921

General characteristics
- Class & type: B-class submarine
- Displacement: 287 long tons (292 t) surfaced; 316 long tons (321 t) submerged
- Length: 142 ft 3 in (43.4 m)
- Beam: 12 ft 7 in (3.8 m)
- Draught: 11 ft 2 in (3.4 m)
- Installed power: 600 bhp (450 kW) petrol; 180 hp (130 kW) electric
- Propulsion: 1 × 16-cylinder Vickers petrol engine; 1 × electric motor
- Speed: 12 kn (22 km/h; 14 mph) surfaced; 6.5 kn (12.0 km/h; 7.5 mph) submerged
- Range: 1,000 nmi (1,900 km; 1,200 mi) at 8.7 kn (16.1 km/h; 10.0 mph) on the surface
- Test depth: 100 feet (30.5 m)
- Complement: 2 officers and 13 ratings
- Armament: 2 × 18 in (450 mm) bow torpedo tubes

HMS B6 was one of 11 B-class submarines built for the Royal Navy in the first decade of the 20th century. The boat survived the First World War and was sold for scrap in 1921.

== Design and description ==
The B class was an enlarged and improved version of the preceding A class. The submarines had a length of 142 feet 3 inches (43.4 m) overall, a beam of 12 feet 7 inches (3.8 m) and a mean draught of 11 feet 2 inches (3.4 m). They displaced 287 long tons (292 t) on the surface and 316 long tons (321 t) submerged. The B-class submarines had a crew of two officers and thirteen ratings.

For surface running, the boats were powered by a single 16-cylinder 600-brake-horsepower (447 kW) Vickers petrol engine that drove one propeller shaft. When submerged the propeller was driven by a 180-horsepower (134 kW) electric motor. They could reach 12 knots (22 km/h; 14 mph) on the surface and 6.5 knots (12.0 km/h; 7.5 mph) underwater. On the surface, the B class had a range of 1,000 nautical miles (1,900 km; 1,200 mi) at 8.7 knots (16.1 km/h; 10.0 mph).

The boats were armed with two 18-inch (450 mm) torpedo tubes in the bow. They could carry a pair of reload torpedoes, but generally did not as they would have to remove an equal weight of fuel in compensation.

== Construction and career ==
B6 was built by Vickers at their Barrow-in-Furness shipyard, launched 30 November 1905 and completed 3 March 1906.

In July 1914, B6 was based at Gibraltar. Following the outbreak of the First World War she was employed in patrolling the Straits of Gibraltar. B6 was deployed to the Eastern Mediterranean for service during the Gallipoli Campaign. On 17 April 1915, the submarine HMS E15 attempted to break through the Dardanelles in order to attack shipping in the Sea of Marmara. E15 ran aground and her crew were forced to abandon ship, so later that day B6 unsuccessfully attempted to torpedo E15 to prevent Turkish attempts to salvage the stricken submarine. E15 was finally torpedoed and sunk by picket boats from the Battleships Majestic and Triumph on the night of 18 April.

In August 1915 B6 and sister ship B11 were sent to Alexandria in Egypt, arriving on 13 August, to deter Turkish attempts to smuggle supplies to Bedouin tribesmen. The two submarines had orders to patrol off Sollum, but were found to be unsuited to this duty, being too small and having too short a range and so were withdrawn from the operation.

In October 1915 B6 was one of six B-class submarines deployed to the Adriatic Sea to support the Italian Navy. It was hoped that the short range of these old submarines would be less of a problem in the confined waters of the Adriatic. In November, the flotilla commenced operations out of Venice. While the B-class submarines proved to be more seaworthy than Italian submarines, operations were hampered by extensive use of mines in the Northern Adriatic.

In 1917 the Italian Navy converted B6 into surface patrol boat S6 to serve in the Adriatic. The boat was sold in 1921 to Messrs. Francotosti, Malta.
