= HMS B5 =

Submarine of the Royal Navy

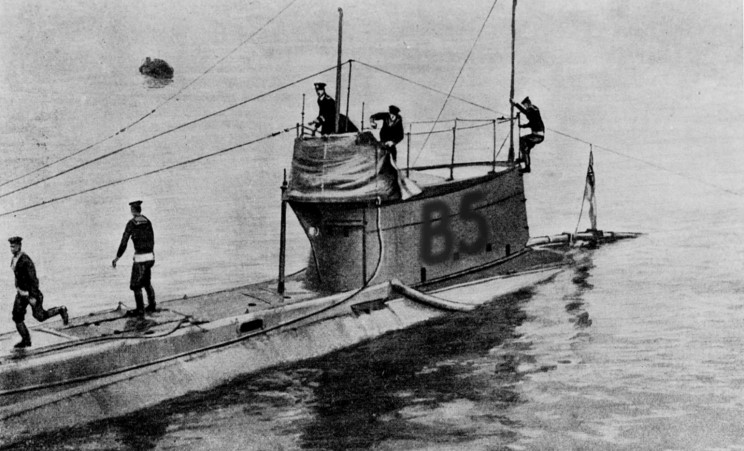

History

United Kingdom
- Name: HMS B5
- Builder: Vickers
- Launched: 14 November 1905
- Completed: 25 February 1906
- Fate: Sold for scrap, 25 August 1921

General characteristics
- Class & type: B-class submarine
- Displacement: 287 long tons (292 t) surfaced; 316 long tons (321 t) submerged
- Length: 142 ft 3 in (43.4 m)
- Beam: 12 ft 7 in (3.8 m)
- Draught: 11 ft 2 in (3.4 m)
- Installed power: 600 bhp (450 kW) petrol; 180 hp (130 kW) electric
- Propulsion: 1 × 16-cylinder Vickers petrol engine; 1 × electric motor
- Speed: 12 kn (22 km/h; 14 mph) surfaced; 6.5 kn (12.0 km/h; 7.5 mph) submerged
- Range: 1,000 nmi (1,900 km; 1,200 mi) at 8.7 kn (16.1 km/h; 10.0 mph) on the surface
- Test depth: 100 feet (30.5 m)
- Complement: 2 officers and 13 ratings
- Armament: 2 × 18 in (450 mm) bow torpedo tubes

HMS B5 was one of 11 B-class submarines built for the Royal Navy in the first decade of the 20th century. She survived World War I and was sold for scrap in 1921.

== Design and description ==
The B class was an enlarged and improved version of the preceding A class. The submarines had a length of 142 feet 3 inches (43.4 m) overall, a beam of 12 feet 7 inches (3.8 m) and a mean draught of 11 feet 2 inches (3.4 m). They displaced 287 long tons (292 t) on the surface and 316 long tons (321 t) submerged. The B-class submarines had a crew of two officers and thirteen ratings.

For surface running, the boats were powered by a single 16-cylinder 600-brake-horsepower (447 kW) Vickers petrol engine that drove one propeller shaft. When submerged the propeller was driven by a 180-horsepower (134 kW) electric motor. They could reach 12 knots (22 km/h; 14 mph) on the surface and 6.5 knots (12.0 km/h; 7.5 mph) underwater. On the surface, the B class had a range of 1,000 nautical miles (1,900 km; 1,200 mi) at 8.7 knots (16.1 km/h; 10.0 mph).

The boats were armed with two 18-inch (450 mm) torpedo tubes in the bow. They could carry a pair of reload torpedoes, but generally did not as they would have to remove an equal weight of fuel in compensation.

== Construction and career ==
B5 was built by Vickers at their Barrow-in-Furness shipyard, launched 14 November 1905 and completed 25 February 1906. When the war began in 1914, the boat was assigned to defend the Straits of Dover. B5 was sold on 25 August 1921 to AJ Anderson, then sold again on 1 March 1922 to J Smith, Poole.
