= Norman Douglas Holbrook =

British submariner; recipient of the Victoria Cross (1888–1976)

Commander Norman Douglas Holbrook VC
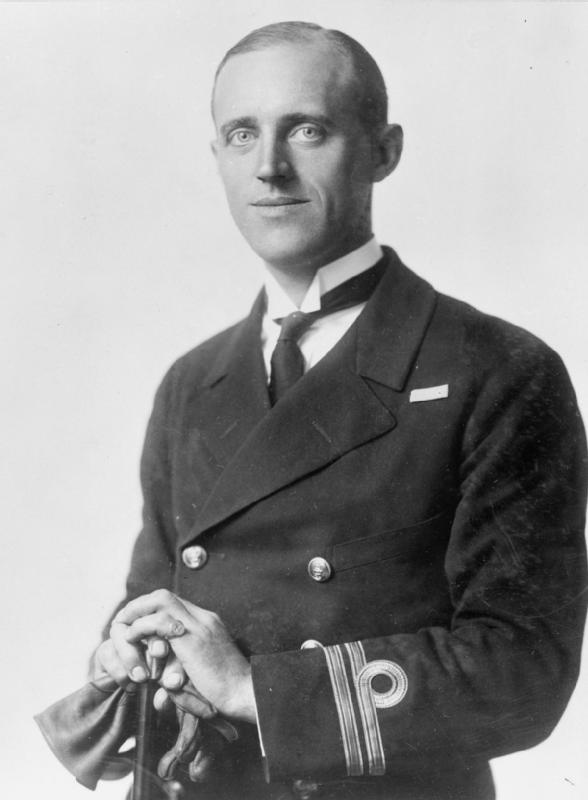
- Holbrook in World War I
- Born: 9 July 1888; Southsea, Hampshire, England
- Died: 3 July 1976 (aged 87); Midhurst, Sussex, England
- Burial place: St James Old Churchyard, Stedham, West Sussex
- Military career
- Allegiance: United Kingdom
- Branch: Royal Navy
- Rank: Commander
- Commands: HMS B11
- Conflicts: World War I World War II
- Awards: Victoria Cross; Légion d'honneur (France)

Commander Norman Douglas Holbrook VC (9 July 1888 – 3 July 1976) was a British naval recipient of the Victoria Cross (VC), the highest award of the British honours system. Holbrook was the first submariner to be awarded the VC and it was the first naval VC gazetted in the First World War.

== Early life ==
Holbrook was born on 9 July 1888 in Southsea, Hampshire, fourth son of Colonel Sir Arthur Holbrook and his wife Amelia (née Parks). Sir Arthur was the proprietor of the Portsmouth Times, founder of the Southern Daily Mail and the Hilsea-based Holbrook Printers, a deputy Lord Lieutenant and later Conservative MP for Basingstoke.

He was educated privately and at Portsmouth Grammar School. In 1903, he enrolled in the officer training establishment Britannia Royal Naval College and was appointed midshipman on 9 January 1905. He joined the submarine depot ship HMS Bonaventure on 4 April 1911, served in submarines HMS F3, HMS V4 and HMS E41 before taking command of HMS B11 on 30 December 1913.

== World War I ==
Holbrook was 26 years old, a lieutenant in the Royal Navy during the First World War when on 13 December 1914 at the Dardanelles, Turkey, he performed a deed for which he was awarded the Victoria Cross. He was in command of the submarine HMS B11, an old and obsolete craft built in 1905. Notwithstanding the difficulties of a treacherous current in the Dardanelles, he dived under five rows of mines and torpedoed and sank the Ottoman ironclad Mesûdiye, which was guarding the mine-field. In spite of being attacked by gunfire and torpedo boats, Holbrook succeeded in bringing the B11 back to the Mediterranean, When they got back to safety the B11 had been submerged for nine hours.

Holbrook later achieved the rank of Commander.

== Marriages ==
Holbrook married Viva Dixon, a widow, on 21 June 1919. They had a son who was killed in action in the Second World War. His wife died in 1952 and in the following year he married Austrian Gundula Bleichart (born 1914, died 2020).

== Death and legacy ==
Holbrook died on 3 July 1976 at Midhurst, Sussex. He was buried at St James Old Churchyard, Stedham, West Sussex. He is probably the only VC recipient to have a town and (until May 2004) a local government area named for him. On 24 August 1915, amid a wave of anti-German feeling related to the First World War, the name of the New South Wales Eastern Riverina town of Germanton was changed to Holbrook to honour the recent VC recipient. He subsequently visited the town on three occasions. His widow, Mrs. Gundula Holbrook, donated his medal to the Council of the Shire of Holbrook in 1982. In 1995 she made a substantial donation towards the establishment of a submariners' memorial in the town, and in 1997 visited the town to unveil it. A bronze statue of Holbrook stands in Germanton Park, Holbrook.

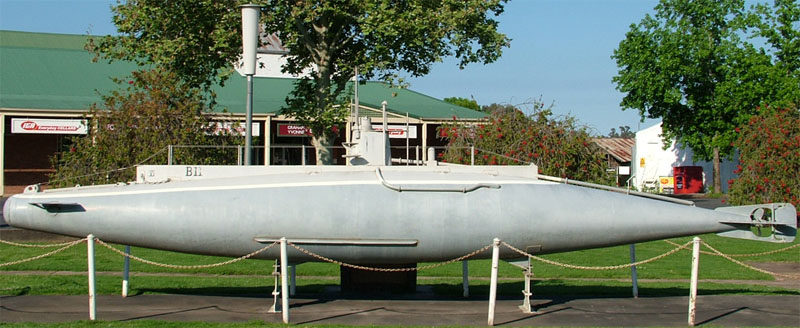
A scale model of the B11 in Holbrook

Holbrook's medal was donated to the Council of the Shire of Holbrook, New South Wales in 1982. It subsequently passed to Greater Hume Shire Council upon the amalgamation of several Riverina shires in May 2004. Holbrook's medal group, including his Victoria Cross, went on display at the Australian War Memorial on 11 December 2009. His medals are on loan from the Greater Hume Shire Council. A replica may be seen at the Submarine Museum, Holbrook.

Holbrook Road in Portsmouth is named after him.

A plaque was erected by the Submariners Association in 2014 on the exterior wall of the Portsmouth Grammar school Junior School facing Cambridge Junction, Portsmouth, UK.
