= HMS E15 =

Submarine of the Royal Navy

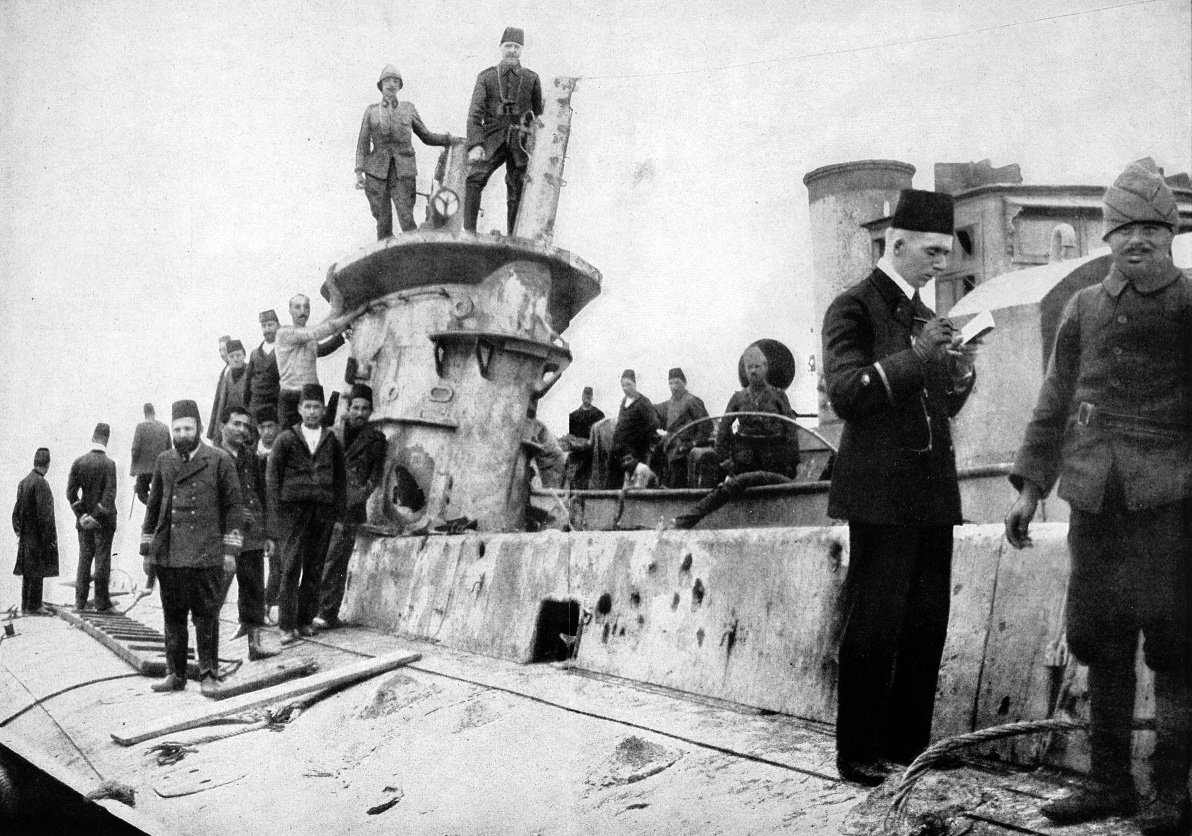
- Wreck of the E15 inspected by Turkish and German personnel.

History

United Kingdom
- Name: E15
- Laid down: 14 October 1912
- Launched: 23 April 1914
- Commissioned: 1914
- Fate: Run aground on 16 April, destroyed 18 April 1915

General characteristics
- Class & type: E-class submarine
- Displacement: 662 tons (surfaced); 807 tons (submerged)
- Length: 54.86 m (180 ft 0 in)
- Beam: 6.86 m (22 ft 6 in)
- Draught: 3.81 m (12 ft 6 in)
- Propulsion: Twin-shaft, 2 × 800 bhp Vickers diesel, 2 × 420 shp electric motors
- Speed: 15.25 knots (surfaced); 9.75 knots (submerged)
- Range: 325 nm surfaced
- Endurance: 24 days
- Complement: 3 officers, 28 ratings
- Armament: 2 × 18-inch (450 mm) bow tube; 2 × 18-inch beam tubes; 1 × 18-inch stern tube; (10 torpedoes); 1 × 12 pdr deck gun

HMS E15 was an E-class submarine of the Royal Navy, commissioned in 1914.

== Design ==
Like all post-E8 British E-class submarines, E15 had a displacement of 662 long tons (673 t) at the surface and 807 long tons (820 t) while submerged. She had a total length of 180 feet (55 m) and a beam of 22 feet 8.5 inches (6.922 m). She was powered by two 800 horsepower (600 kW) Vickers eight-cylinder two-stroke diesel engines and two 420 horsepower (310 kW) electric motors. The submarine had a maximum surface speed of 16 knots (30 km/h; 18 mph) and a submerged speed of 10 knots (19 km/h; 12 mph). British E-class submarines had fuel capacities of 50 long tons (51 t) of diesel and ranges of 3,255 miles (5,238 km; 2,829 nmi) when travelling at 10 knots (19 km/h; 12 mph). E15 was capable of operating submerged for five hours when travelling at 5 knots (9.3 km/h; 5.8 mph).

As with most of the early E-class boats, E15 was not fitted with a deck gun during construction but, as a vessel engaged in the Dardanelles campaign, later had a 12-pounder 76 mm (3.0 in) QF gun fitted, forward of the conning tower, at Malta Dockyard. She had five 18-inch (450 mm) torpedo tubes, two in the bow, one either side amidships, and one in the stern; a total of 10 torpedoes were carried.

E-class submarines had wireless systems with 1 kW power ratings; in some submarines, these were later upgraded to 3 kW systems by removing a midship torpedo tube. Their maximum design depth was 100 feet (30 m) although in service some reached depths of below 200 feet (61 m). Some submarines contained Fessenden oscillator systems. Her complement was three officers and 28 men.

== Service history ==
During World War I, E15 served in the Mediterranean, participating in the Gallipoli Campaign against the Ottoman Empire. On 16 April 1915, under the command of Lieutenant Commander Theodore S. Brodie, E15 sailed from her base at Mudros and attempted to break through the Dardanelles to the Sea of Marmara. Early in the morning of 17 April, the submarine, having dived too deep and become caught in the vicious current, ran aground some ten miles (16 km) in near Kepez Point directly under the guns of Fort Dardanos. E15 was soon hit and disabled; Brodie was killed in the conning tower by shrapnel and six of the crew were killed by chlorine gas released when the submarine's batteries were exposed to seawater after a second shell strike. Forced to evacuate the vessel, the remaining crew surrendered, to be incarcerated in a prisoner of war camp near Istanbul where six later died.

The stranding was soon noticed by aeroplanes of the Royal Naval Air Service (RNAS), and reported to the SS Hindu Kush, the Allied submarines' HQ and depot ship. It was considered imperative that the E15 be destroyed to prevent the Turks from salvaging her. Several attempts were made; first, the British submarine B6, with Brodie's brother on board, tried to sink her by torpedo but missed. Later, during the night, the destroyers HMS Grampus and Scorpion (commanded by the future Admiral A. B. Cunningham of World War II British Mediterranean Fleet fame), attempted to find her, but failed. The following morning, B11 also failed to locate the beached E15 owing to dense fog. Then the battleships Triumph and Majestic were ordered in but, prevented by intense fire from the Turkish shore batteries from getting within 11,000 metres of the submarine, were obliged to withdraw. Meanwhile, seaplanes attempted to bomb the stricken E15 but also failed.

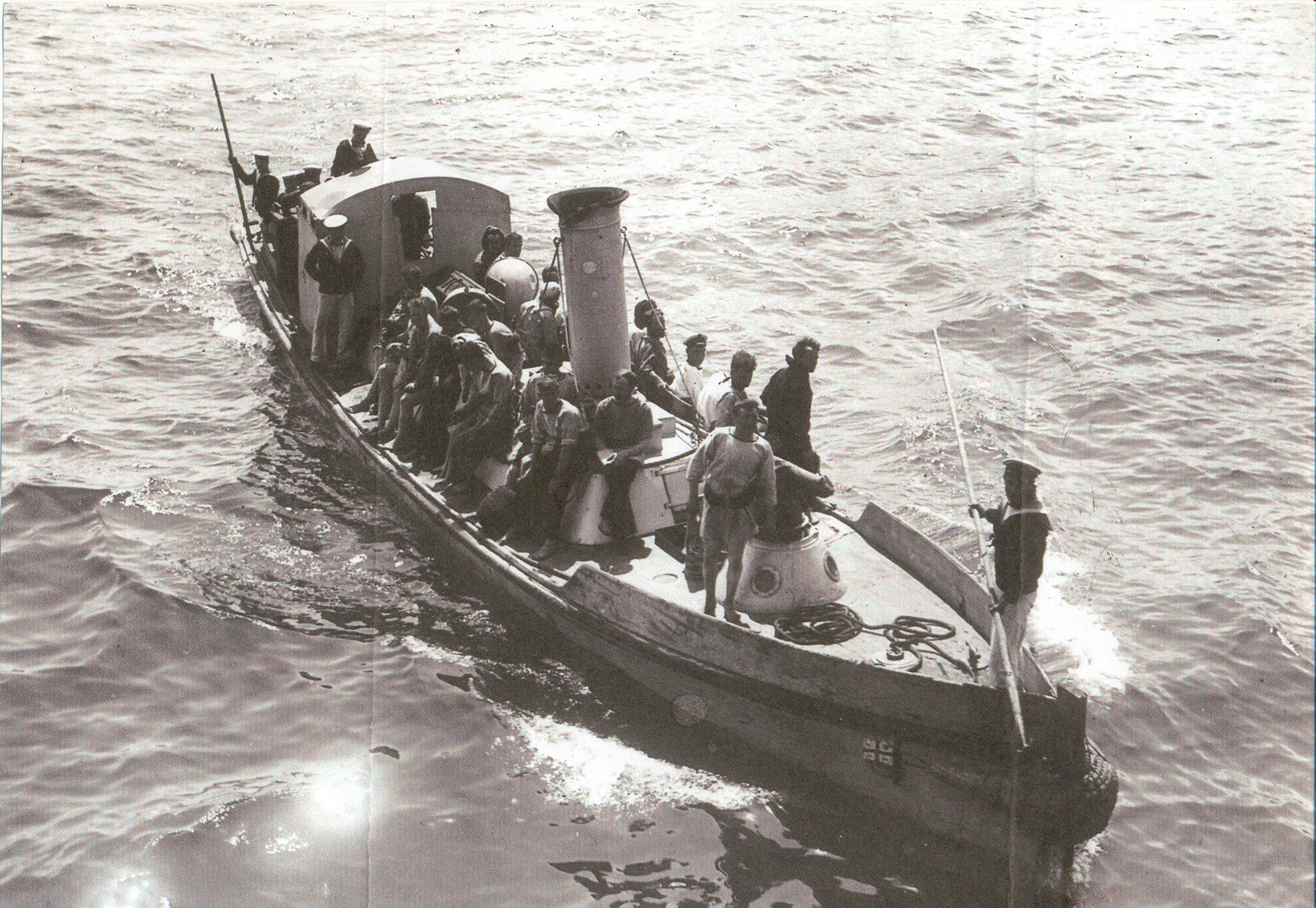
HMS Triumph's picket boat returning to the battleship after the E15 expedition.

Finally, on the night of 18 April, two 17-metre (56 ft) picket boats, one from Triumph, the other from Majestic, both armed with two 14-inch (356 mm) diameter torpedoes mounted in dropping gear, went in. Lieutenant Commander Eric Robinson, a volunteer from Vengeance, commanded the expedition from Triumph's boat; Lieutenant Claud Herbert Godwin skippered the boat from Majestic. Departing at 2200 hrs, the two vessels managed to navigate the narrow channel for seven miles (11 km) before being detected and illuminated by searchlights, attracting a hail of fire from both shores. Miraculously both boats remained unscathed, and when one carelessly directed searchlight briefly illuminated the stricken submarine, Godwin seized his chance. Blinded by the lights, his first shot missed, and seconds afterwards the Turkish gunners scored their only hit, blowing away part of the stern and mortally wounding one seaman. Undeterred, Godwin went in again and fired his second torpedo, which struck E15 just forward of the conning tower, but well below the waterline. Robinson, observing his comrades' plight, unhesitatingly brought his boat alongside and rescued them. Now doubly laden, Triumph's boat fled downstream unobserved, the Turkish gunners concentrating their fire on the drifting and abandoned wreck of her sister ship.

The E15 action would no doubt have earned Robinson the Victoria Cross had he not already been recommended for the award following earlier exploits on the Gallipoli peninsula. Instead, he was promoted to commander by special decree. Lieutenant Godwin was awarded the DSO, Lt. Brooke-Webb and Midshipman Woolley received the DSC, while the rest of the crews, all volunteers, received the DSM.

E15 remains off Kepez Point in 8 m of water. The bodies of Lieut. Commander Brodie and several crew, initially buried on a beach nearby, were reinterred at the Chanak Consular Cemetery.
