= A-class submarine (1903) =

1902 class of British submarines

- HMS A1

Class overview
- Name: A-class
- Builders: Vickers, Barrow-in-Furness
- Operators: Royal Navy
- Preceded by: Holland class
- Succeeded by: B-class
- Completed: 13

General characteristics (A8–A13)
- Type: Submarine
- Displacement: 190 tons surfaced; 207 tons submerged
- Length: 105 ft 0 1/2 in (32.02 m)
- Beam: 12 ft 8 3/4 in (3.88 m)
- Draught: 10 ft 8 in (3.25 m) surfaced
- Propulsion: 16 cylinder Wolseley 600 hp (450 kW) petrol engine; 150 hp (110 kW) electric motor
- Speed: 11 1/2 kn (21.3 km/h; 13.2 mph) surfaced; 6 kn (11 km/h; 6.9 mph) dived
- Complement: 11
- Armament: 2 × 18 in (460 mm) torpedo tubes (bow, four torpedoes)

The A-class was the Royal Navy's first class of British-designed submarines. Thirteen were built by Vickers at Barrow-in-Furness between 1902 and 1905 as an improvement on the US Plunger class.

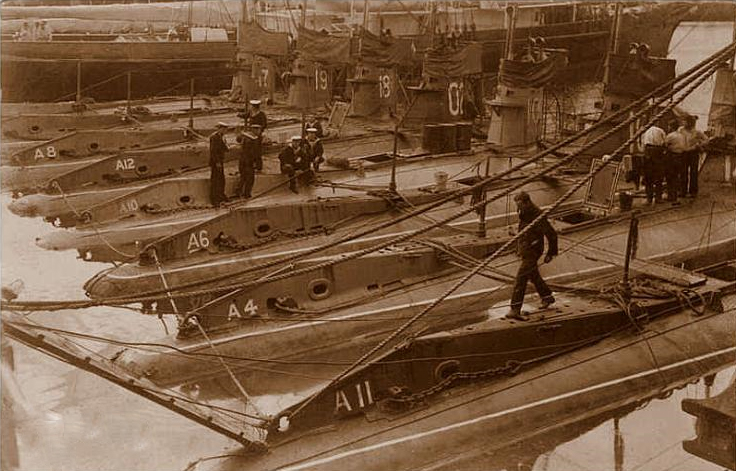
A-class submarines moored in port

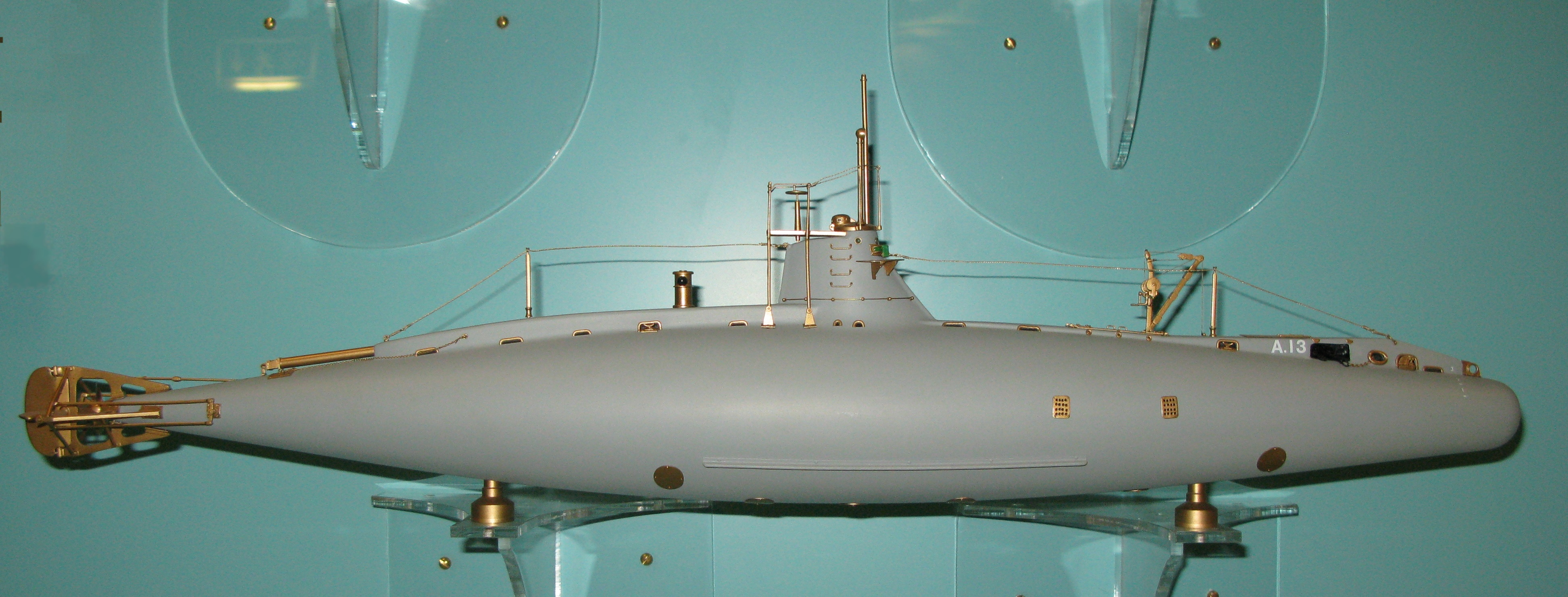
HMS A13 model

== Design and construction ==
While there was considerable variation amongst the boats of the class, they were around 100 feet (30 m) long and displaced around 200 tons when submerged. The first, A1 (ordered as Holland No. 6), was launched in July 1902, the last, A13, in April 1905.

=== Propulsion ===
All were propelled underwater by battery-powered electric motors and on the surface by shaft-drive Wolseley petrol engines of 400 bhp (300 kW) (A1), 450 bhp (340 kW) (A2-A4) or 600 bhp (450 kW) (A5-A12). A13 had an experimental 500 bhp (370 kW) Vickers diesel engine, which proved to be unreliable.

=== Armaments ===
Armament was two 18-inch (46 cm) torpedo tubes with four torpedoes except for A1, which had 1 tube and 3 torpedoes.

== Service history ==
This submarine class was plagued by numerous accidents and failures; almost every boat in the class (A1, A3, A4, A5, A7, and A8) was involved in some sort of accident over the course of their operational history. Many were fatal to the crew, and resulted in the decommissioning of the submarine. A1 was sunk off Portsmouth on 18 March 1904, in collision with the liner Berwick Castle, but raised and put back into service before finally being sunk as a naval gunnery target in 1911, followed in 1912 by A3. A7 was lost in Whitsand Bay in 1914 after diving into mud. A13 was laid up in 1914 due to engine unreliability.

The remainder were used during World War I for harbour defence, A2 and A4, A5 and A6 at Portsmouth, A8 and A9 at Devonport, and A10, A11 and A12 at Ardrossan. All survived the war and were converted to training in 1918 and sold in 1919–1920 except for A2, which was wrecked while awaiting disposal and finally sold in 1925.
