= Methods used by advocacy groups =

Methods used by advocacy groups aim to influence public opinion and shape public policy in support of the groups' objectives. The nature of an advocacy group's activities depends largely on the scope of the group's objectives. Motives for action by an advocacy group may be based on a shared political, religious, moral, medical, or commercial position. Groups use various methods to pursue their aims, including lobbying, media campaigns, publicity stunts, polls, research, and policy briefings. Some groups are supported by powerful business or political interests – and thereby exert considerable influence on the political process – while other groups have limited or no resources of this type.

== Letter-writing, petitions, and marches ==
Traditionally, the campaigns of advocacy groups have included letter-writing, petitions and marches. For example, in the mid-1980s, the UK organisation Life compiled a petition with more than two million names opposed to abortion; organised the "Mail MPs a Mountain" campaign in 1987; and employed postcard campaigns in 1989 and 1990 against the UK Human Fertilisation and Embryology Act 1990.

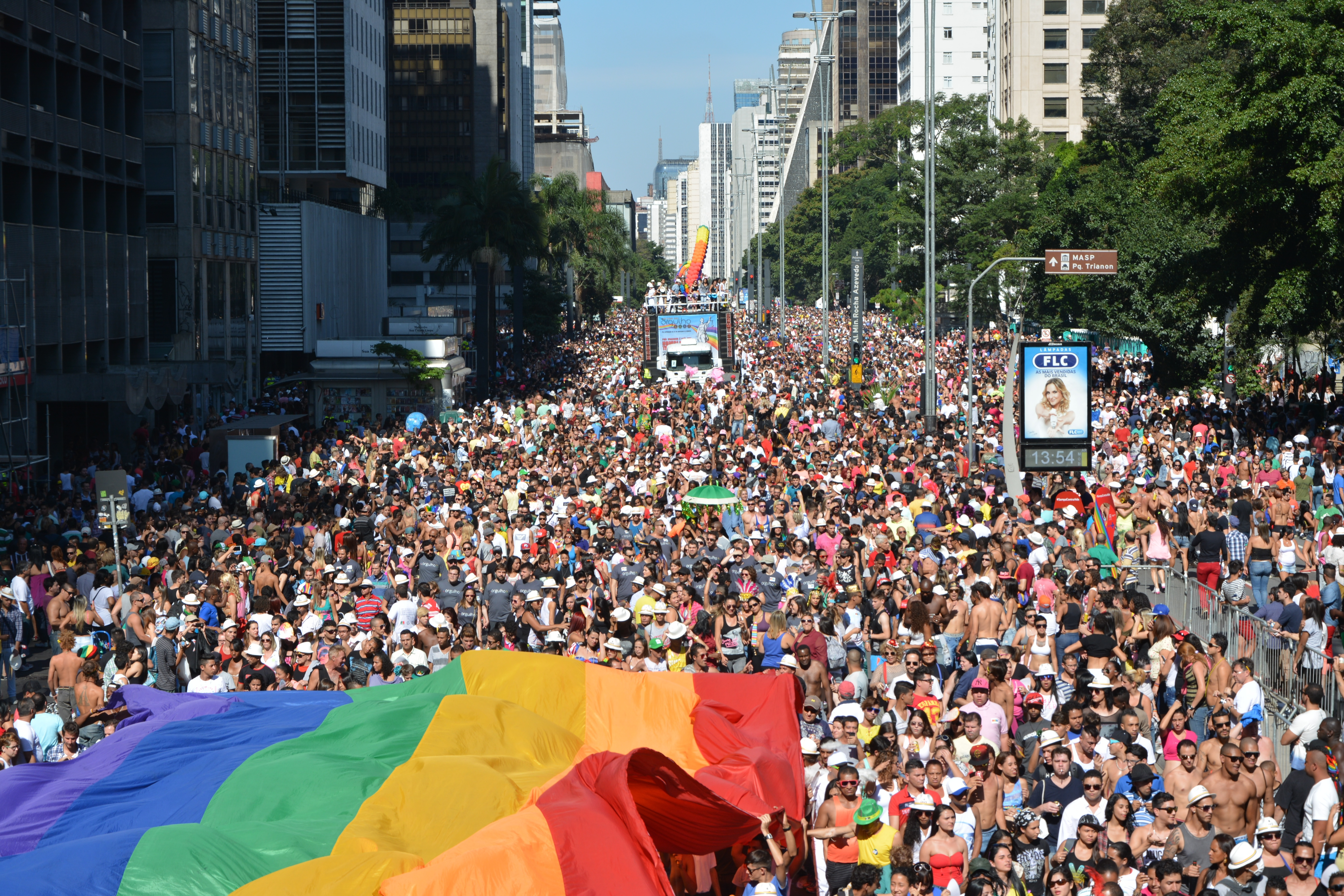
São Paulo's 18th annual LGBT Pride Parade, 2014

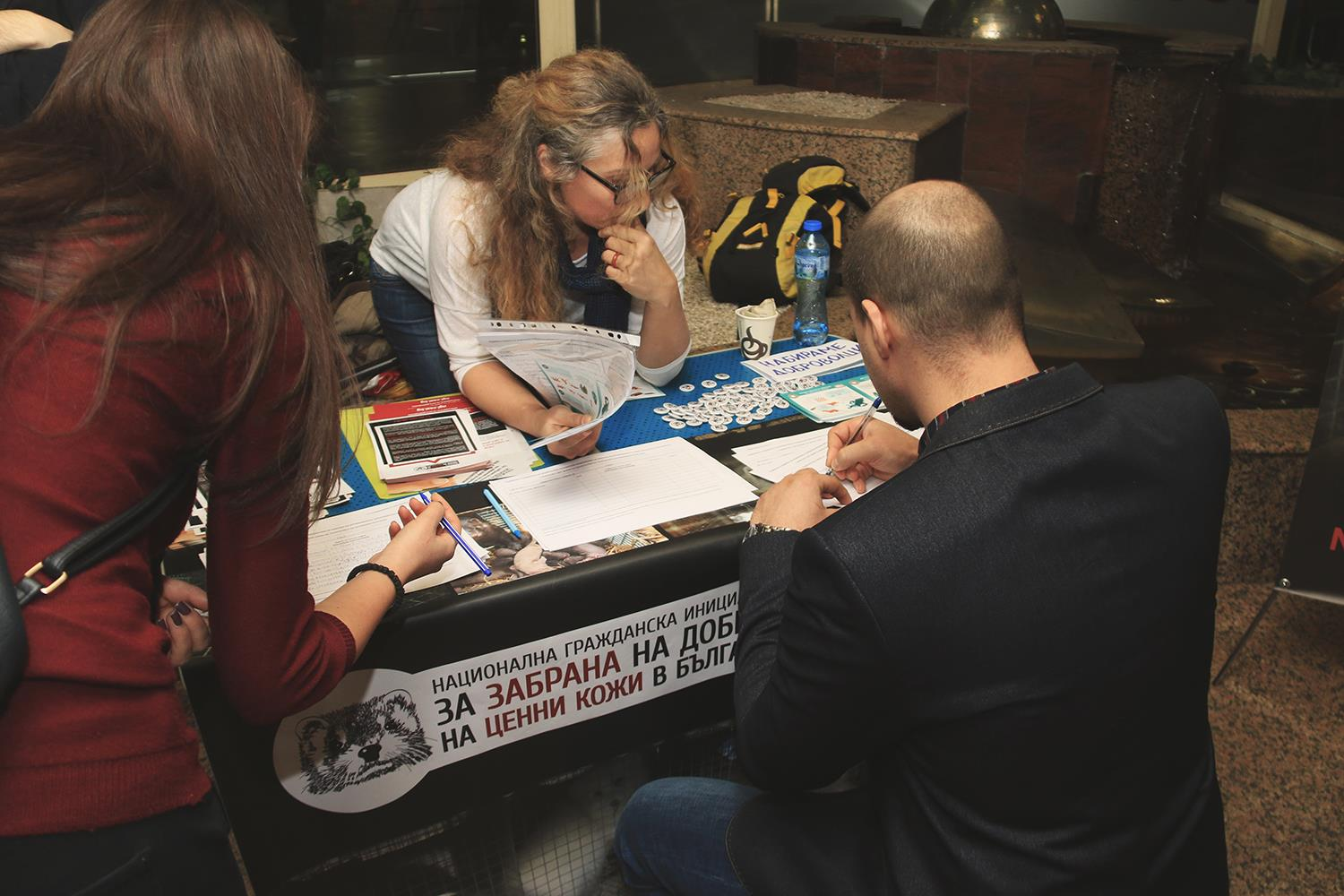
Collection of signatures for a petition in Sofia, Bulgaria, in 2018

Marches and demonstrations organised by the All Britain Anti-Poll Tax Federation in 1990 were said to have contributed to Margaret Thatcher's resignation as Prime Minister in November of that year; they also led to the subsequent replacement of the 1989 Community Charge (a.k.a. Poll Tax) with the local Council Tax system in 1993. In February 2003, millions of people gathered in public protest as part of the British Stop the War Coalition's efforts to persuade the US government not to deploy forces in Iraq.

In countries such as the United States, petition-signing and letter-writing have been used to good effect at LGBTQ pride marches. These campaigns have been influential in the repeal of sodomy laws; support for civil unions and same-sex marriage; and support for anti-discrimination legislation. For example, in the 1998 Asbury Park pride march, the New Jersey Lesbian and Gay Coalition distributed postcards to Governor Christine Todd Whitman and two members of the New Jersey General Assembly, asking them to oppose a state version of the Defense of Marriage Act. The Philadelphia Lesbian and Gay Task Force also distributed an "Update Call to Action" flyer, urging people to make telephone calls to state officials and write letters in support of several changes: education reform; revising state education policies; and adding sexual orientation and gender identity as protected rights under the Pennsylvania Civil Rights Initiative.

In the UK during 2002, following public concerns about two issues – a proposed ban on hunting with dogs and a general lack of attention to rural issues – the organisation Countryside Alliance organised "the march for Liberty and Livelihood". This march reportedly attracted more than 400,000 people (including the Conservative Party leader Iain Duncan Smith), including supporters from New Zealand, Australia, Canada, the United States, and Europe.

== Influencing the legislative process ==
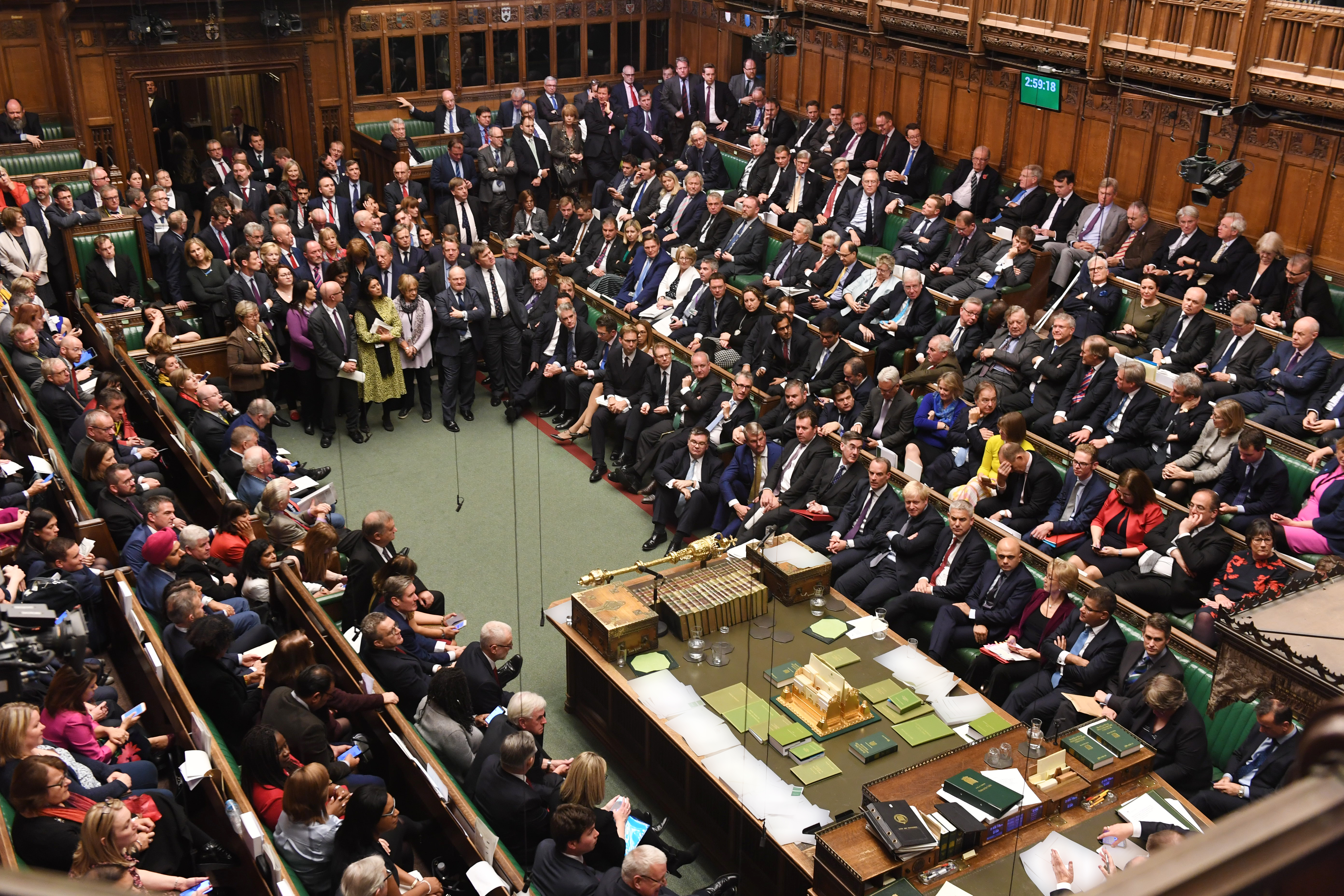
A debate in the House of Commons in the UK

In most liberal democracies, advocacy groups tend to use the bureaucracy as the main channel of influence – in liberal democracies, this is where the decision-making power lies. The aim of advocacy groups in this situation is to influence a member of the legislature to support their cause, by voting a certain way in the legislature. Access to this channel is generally restricted to groups with insider status, such as large corporations and trade unions; groups with outsider status are typically unable to meet with ministers or other members of the bureaucracy to discuss policy.

Regarding groups exerting influence in the bureaucracy, it is essential to understand that "the crucial relationship here [in the bureaucracy] is usually that between the senior bureaucrats and leading business or industrial interests". This statement supports the view that groups with greater financial resources at their disposal will generally be better able to influence the decision-making process of government. The advantages of large businesses arise mainly because they are key producers within their country's economy. Therefore, their interests are important to the government, since their contributions are significant to the economy. According to the writer and activist George Monbiot, the influence of big business has been strengthened by "the greater ease with which corporations can relocate production and investment in a global economy". This comment suggests that in an ever-modernising world, big business has an increasing role in influencing the bureaucracy and, in turn, the decision-making process of government.

Core insider groups can directly influence the formation of government policy at its primary stage through direct consultation with ministers, the civil service, and government-appointed bodies working on these legislative proposals. Beyond these core insiders, specialist insider groups may also be asked to provide specific information on a particular issue, when their perspectives or specialist interests must be represented in discussions with ministers, the civil service, or the government of the day.

This consultation may involve informal discussions with relevant departments, or it may be structured more around a Green Paper document. Many larger groups employ lobbyists to pursue their legislative goals; of those groups in the UK, the richest maintain permanent Westminster offices. In the modern era, it has become more common for groups to employ lobbyists, who will use their contacts on behalf of a pressure group in exchange for a fee; however, groups whose aims are local and limited in scale may be able to achieve their goals without lobbying, in contrast to broader-based groups.

In the UK, the cash-for-questions affair—a political scandal in the 1990s—began when The Guardian newspaper alleged that London's most successful parliamentary lobbyist, Ian Greer of Ian Greer Associates, had bribed two Conservative Members of Parliament in exchange for asking parliamentary questions (and handling other tasks); these bribes were allegedly on behalf of the Egyptian owner of Harrods department store, Mohamed Al-Fayed. The controversy prompted Prime Minister John Major to establish the Nolan Committee to review the issue of standards in public life.

Lobbying in the US and in the UK is regulated to prevent the worst abuses, which can develop into political corruption. In the US, the Internal Revenue Service makes a clear distinction between lobbying and advocacy.

== Influencing political parties ==
Advocacy groups can cultivate links with political parties in order to influence policy decisions. This influencing is better done when the target party is in opposition; if the party in government, it is typically hindered by time constraints, and policy formation is likely to be top-down (rather than bottom-up). However, when a party is in opposition, it is usually more open to a variety of ideas, in order to broaden electoral support and formulate new policies. For example, during the UK Labour Party's time in opposition between 1979 and 1997, groups such as Charter 88 and the Electoral Reform Society attempted to cultivate links with the party.

Groups can also cultivate links with political parties through campaign finance. In the UK, for instance, since the Conservative Party's campaigns are often funded by large corporations, it has been argued that many of the party's campaigns reflect business interests. A US study based on data from 48 states found that every $1 "invested" in corporate campaign contributions is worth $6.65 in lower state corporate taxes. The re-election campaign of President George W. Bush in 2004 was the most expensive in US history, and it was financed mainly by large corporations and industrial interests that the Bush administration represented in government. Conversely, left-wing parties are often funded by organised labour; for example, when the UK Labour Party was formed, it was largely funded by trade unions. Political parties are often formed as a result of group pressure; for example, the UK Labour Party was formed out of the new trade-union movement, which lobbied for the rights of workers.

== Legal action ==
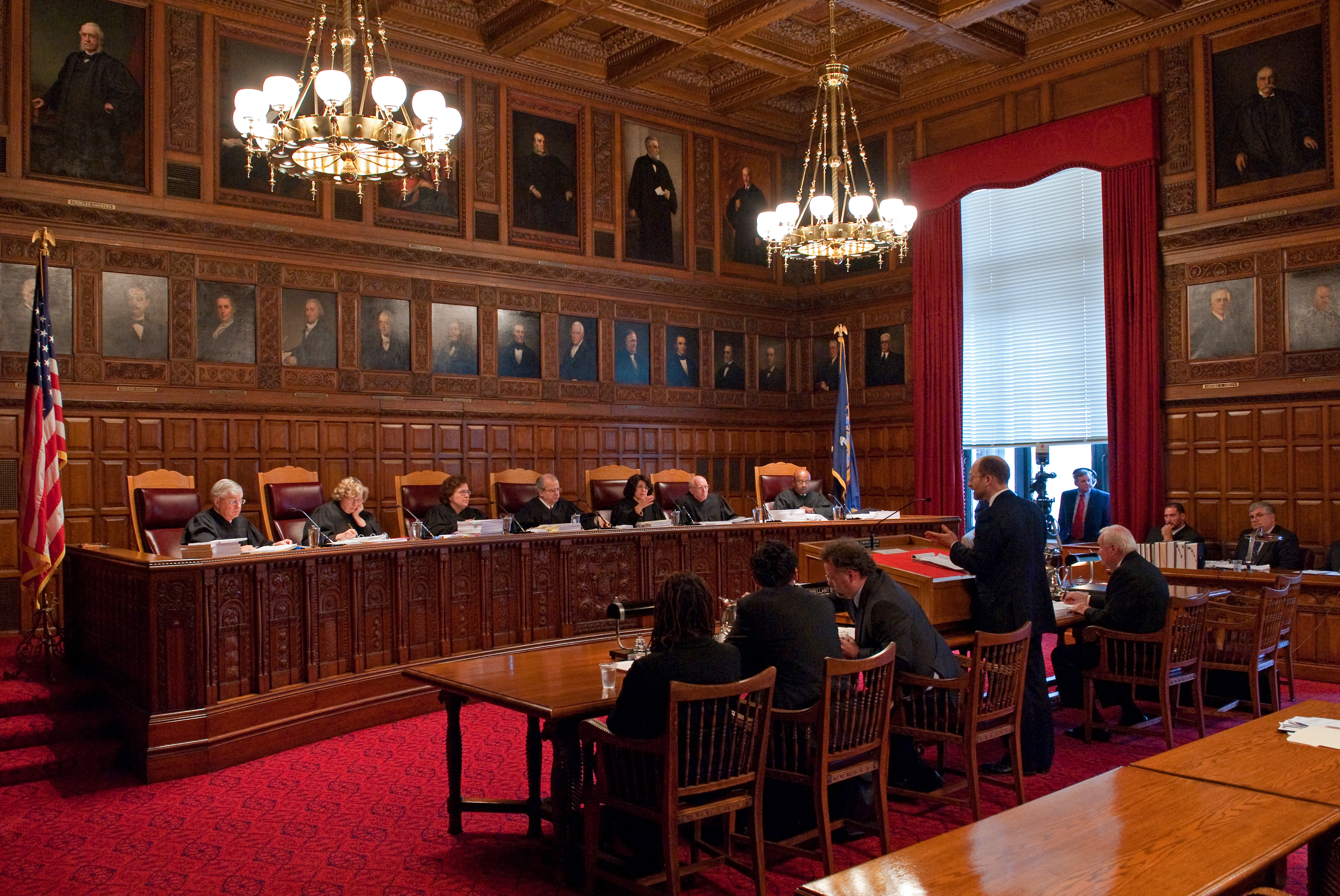
The New York Court of Appeals hearing oral arguments in 2009

The judicial branch of government can also be used by advocacy groups to exert influence, especially in states that have codified constitutions, such as the United States. For example, the National Association for the Advancement of Colored People (NAACP) lobbied against the Topeka Board of Education in 1954 (Brown v. Board of Education), arguing that segregation of education based on race was unconstitutional. As a result of group pressure from the NAACP, the Supreme Court of the United States unanimously ruled that racial segregation in education was indeed unconstitutional; as a result, such practices were banned. This is a novel example of how advocacy groups can exert influence in the judicial branch of government.

Although British courts do not have the same powers of judicial review as the US Supreme Court does, litigation has been deemed a successful tactic by British pressure groups. Such action generally works on four levels:

1. Where a court finds that a government has acted ultra vires;
2. Where the rules in place violate EU law or the European Convention on Human Rights;
3. Where an Act of Parliament or action of a public official violates the Human Rights Act 1998;
4. Where litigation raises public awareness of an issue, regardless of the outcome of the case. For example, the UK ProLife Alliance attempted to use the UK Human Rights Act 1998 to prevent the separation of conjoined twins Rosie and Gracie Attard, where it became clear that Rosie would die as a result of the procedure, in order to highlight loopholes in the UK Human Fertilisation and Embryology Act 1990.

== Direct action ==
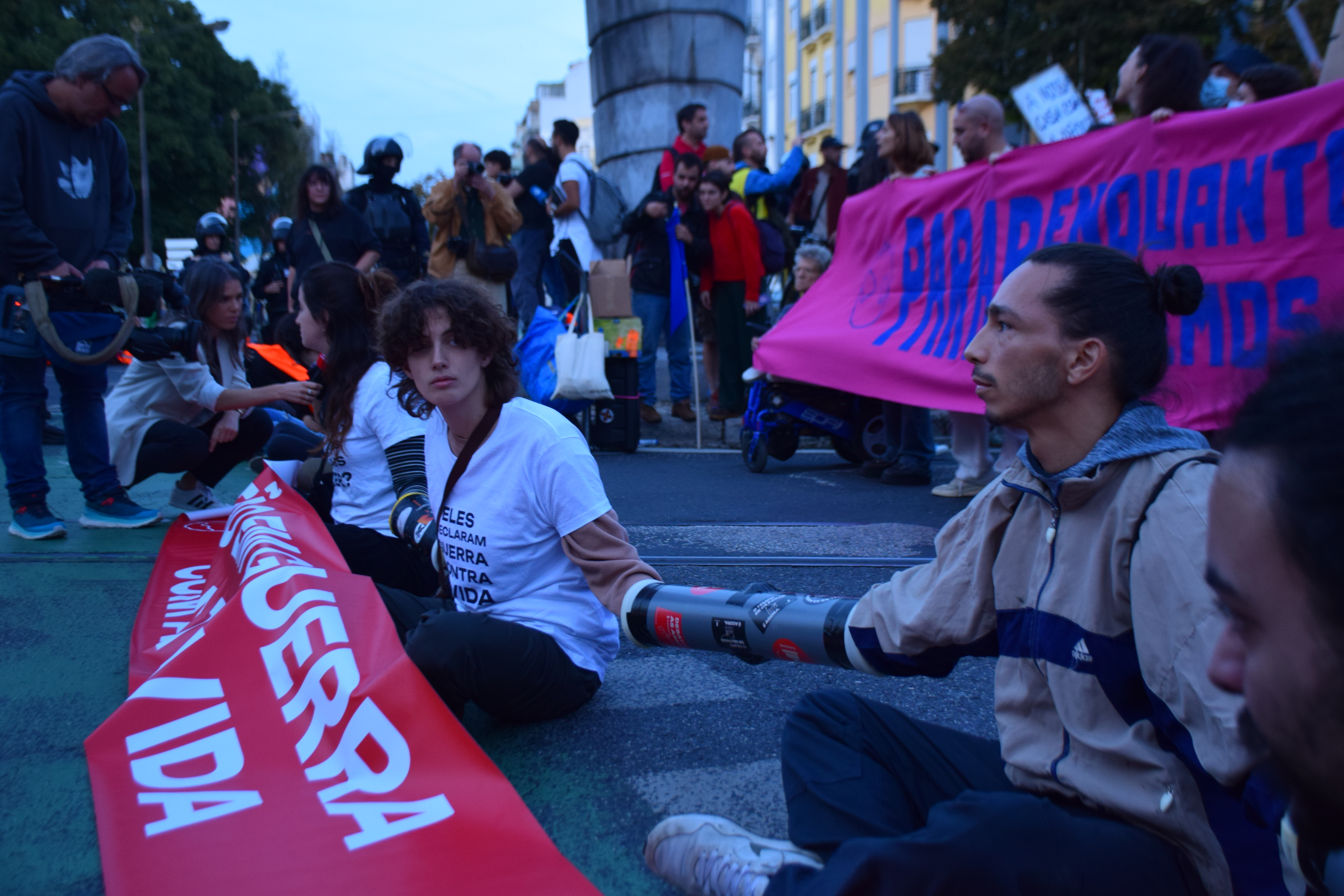
The Portuguese climate activist group Climaximo blocking a road

The use of direct action as a method of activism is increasingly popular among advocacy groups. There are two assumptions behind direct group action: first, traditional methods of influencing government policy are flawed; second, more direct protests, acts of civil disobedience, and illegal acts and violence (in more extreme cases) may offer the best opportunities for a group's success, since these actions attract media attention.

During the 1970s and 1980s, direct action was often used by gay liberation movements. For example, the Gay Activists Alliance in the United States often used so-called "zap" actions to achieve their objectives.
