= HMS M1 (1917) =

Submarine of the British Royal Navy launched in 1917

Coordinates: 49°59′N 3°56′W

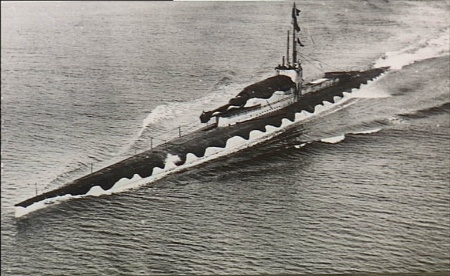
- HMS M1, painted in a camouflage pattern.

History

United Kingdom
- Name: HMS M1
- Launched: 9 July 1917
- Home port: Portsmouth
- Fate: Sunk in collision, 12 November 1925

General characteristics
- Class & type: M-class submarine
- Displacement: 1,594 long tons (1,620 t) surfaced; 1,946 long tons (1,977 t) submerged
- Length: 295 ft 9 in (90.14 m)
- Beam: 24 ft 8 in (7.52 m)
- Installed power: 2,400 hp (1,800 kW) (diesel engines); 3,200 hp (2,400 kW) (electric motors)
- Propulsion: 2 × 12-cylinder Vickers diesel engines; 4 × electric motors; 2 × 3-blade, 5 ft 10 in (1.78 m) diameter screws
- Speed: 15 kn (17 mph; 28 km/h) (surfaced); 8–9 kn (9.2–10.4 mph; 15–17 km/h) (submerged)
- Range: 2,000 nmi (2,300 mi; 3,700 km) at 15 kn (17 mph; 28 km/h); 4,500 nmi (5,200 mi; 8,300 km) at 10 kn (12 mph; 19 km/h)
- Endurance: 80 nmi (92 mi; 150 km) at 2 kn (2.3 mph; 3.7 km/h)
- Test depth: 200 ft (61 m)
- Complement: 62
- Armament: 1 × 12-inch (305mm)/40 cal Mark IX gun with 50 rounds; 1 × 3 in (76 mm) Mk II HA anti-aircraft gun; 4 × 18 inch (450 mm) bow torpedo tubes with 4 reload torpedoes

HMS M1 was a submarine of the British Royal Navy, one of four vessels of her class ordered towards the end of the First World War. She sank with the loss of her entire crew in 1925.

The vessels were originally intended as "submarine monitors", but their purpose had been changed before detailed design began. M1 was fitted with a 12-inch (305mm) gun which was intended for use against surface ships in preference to torpedoes, the argument being that, "No case is known of a ship-of-war being torpedoed when under way at a range outside of 1,000 yd (914 m; 3,000 ft)."

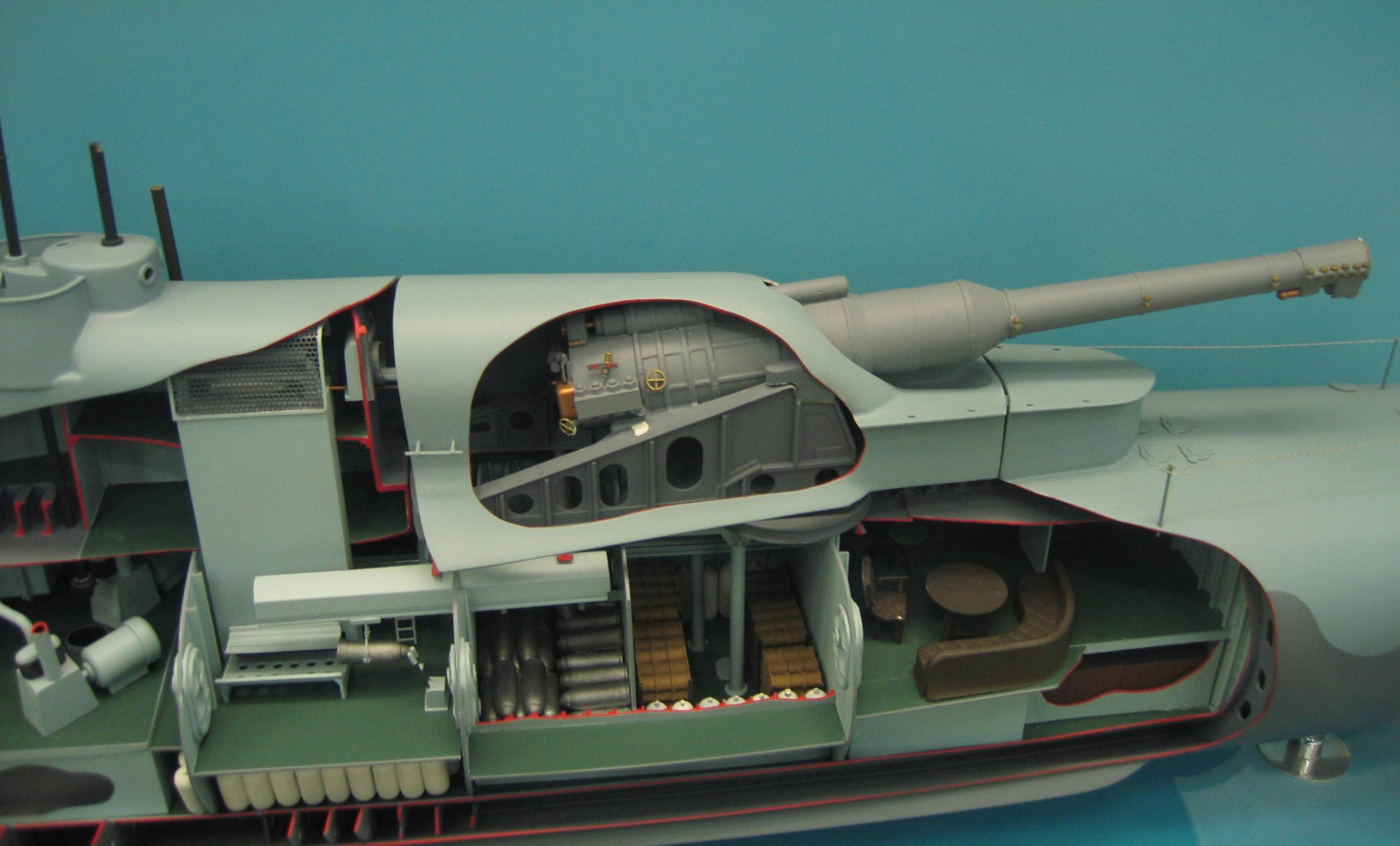
Sectioned model in the Science Museum, showing the 12 in (300 mm) turret

Although the gun had an effective range of 15,000 yards (13.7 km; 8.52 mi), it was normally fired using a simple bead sight at periscope depth with only the barrel above the water. It was important for the submarine's gun to sink or disable the target with the first shot, because the gun could only be loaded on the surface.

She was 295 feet 9 inches (90.14 m) long, displaced 1,950 long tons (1,980 t) submerged and operated out of Portsmouth. She was launched on 9 July 1917, but was not involved in active service in the First World War.

In 1923, water leaking into the barrel of the gun resulted in extensive damage to the muzzle when it was fired.

She sank with all 69 hands in 70 metres (230 ft) of water on 12 November 1925 while on an exercise in the English Channel when a Swedish ship, SS Vidar, struck her while she was submerged. The collision tore the gun from the hull and water flooded the interior through the gun mounting hole. The crew members appear to have tried to escape by flooding the interior and opening the escape hatch, but their bodies were never found.

A diving team led by Innes McCartney discovered her wreck in 1999 at a depth of 73 metres (240 ft). Later that year, Richard Larn and a BBC TV documentary crew visited the wreck, and the resulting film was broadcast in March 2000. The wreck is designated as a "protected place" under the Protection of Military Remains Act 1986.
