= HMS M4 =

HMS M4 may refer to the following ships of the Royal Navy:

- HMS Roberts (1915), a monitor originally named M4
- HMS M4 (1919), the fourth M-class submarine

== See also ==
- HSwMS M4 (1940) (Swedish: HMS M4), a Swedish Royal Navy M-type minesweeper; see List of mine warfare vessels of the Swedish Navy
- HSwMS Carlskrona (M04) (1980) (Swedish: HMS M4), a Swedish Royal Navy minelayer
