= Classification of advocacy groups =

An advocacy group is a group or an organization that tries to influence the government but does not hold power in the government. Advocacy groups are generally classified according to two broad typologies: their core aims (group–cause typology), and their relationship to government (insider–outsider typology).

== Classification by aims ==
Early attempts to classify advocacy groups, first developed in the United Kingdom by J. D. Stewart in the 1950s, generally focused on who or what causes they represented.

=== Sectional groups ===
Sometimes referred to as "protectionist groups", "private interest groups" or simply "interest groups". Such groups are normally exclusive, as their membership is usually restricted to the section of society whose interests they represent: for example the British Medical Association (as those seeking to join the BMA must be medical practitioners or students training to enter the profession), or organisations such as the Law Society.

However, the most common sectional groups worldwide are financial interest groups. This includes business groups (such as the Canadian Federation of Independent Business, the Confederation of British Industry, and the Nestlé Corporation (Switzerland)), labour groups (such as NASUWT, the National Union of Teachers (NUT) and the Trades Union Congress (United Kingdom); IG Metall (Germany); and the AFL–CIO (United States)), farm groups (such as the Irish Farmers' Association and the American Farm Bureau Federation), and professional groups (such as the American Bar Association).

=== Cause groups ===
Sometimes referred to as "promotional groups" or "public interest groups", these organisations campaign for a specific cause or objective, promoting approaches, issues or ideas that may not be of direct benefit to group members. They are invariably and explicitly non-partisan and represent a segment of society whose primary purpose is focused on promoting a particular cause or value. This therefore makes them more inclusive, as they generally try to establish wide popular support and do not implement as many restrictions on group membership. For example, the Royal Society for the Protection of Birds (RSPB) has become one of the largest and most visible UK cause groups, with over 1 million members (including 200,000 youth members), over 2,000 staff members and 13,000 volunteers nationwide.

This category is wide-ranging, including civil liberties groups such as Liberty, Amnesty International, the League Against Cruel Sports, Countryside Alliance, the Institute for Public Policy Research and Policy Exchange. Charities such as Save the Children may fall under this category, as well as churches and religious organizations (e.g., Catholic Action in Italy), veterans' groups (e.g., the Union Française des Associations d'Anciens Combattants et Victimes de Guerre), and groups supporting the rights of people with disabilities (e.g., the Organización Nacional de Ciegos Españoles (ONCE)), and some have even argued that organised religious groups such as the Roman Catholic Church would fall into this category.

Cause groups are generally subdivided into three further categories: sectional cause groups, attitude cause groups and political cause groups:

- Sectional cause groups – aims to protect a specific section of society that is distinct from its own membership. For example, although the National Society for the Prevention of Cruelty to Children (NSPCC) works on behalf of the rights of children, the majority of its members and supporters are adults;
- Attitude cause groups – aim to change people's attitude on a particular issue (often to the exclusion of others). Greenpeace, for example, seeks to change attitudes on the environment, although most cause groups have a broader remit;
- Political cause groups – aim to achieve certain political objectives, e.g. Charter 88, now Unlock Democracy, clearly has a political objective. The Chartists in the nineteenth century are also sometimes contemporarily classified as a political cause group.

Many public interest groups operate in a single country (e.g., the Federal Association of Citizen-Action Groups for Environmental Protection in Germany). Others, such as the Sierra Club, may operate in only a few countries; however, many public interest groups have a much broader international presence, with activities in many countries (e.g., Amnesty International and the International Campaign to Ban Landmines).

== Classification by group status ==
The issues surrounding the classification of advocacy groups according to their core aims has led writers such as Wyn Grant to divide groups according to the insider–outsider typology, i.e. how close a particular advocacy group is to the government of the day, and to what extent it can develop secure and positive relationships with politicians and officials.

=== Insider groups ===
Insider groups are groups that enjoy close access to government agencies and officials.

- Core insiders: Those with strong two-way relationships over a range of issues (e.g., CBI);
- Specialist insiders: Those granted insider status but limited to a narrower area of expertise (e.g., the WWF);
- Peripheral insiders: Those who are granted insider status but are barely ever consulted by the government due to the narrow nature of their cause (e.g. the Dogs Trust).

=== Outsider groups ===
Organisations outside the "political loop" are described as outsider groups. These fall under three subcategories: potential insiders, outsiders by necessity, and ideological outsiders.

- Potential insiders – groups that may achieve insider status in the future but are lacking in terms of support or experience. Charter 88 was considered a potential insider before 1997 (at which point the organisation became an insider group).
- Outsiders by necessity – groups forced to operate as outsiders and as a result are unlikely to have any realistic consultation with the government due to the nature of their cause or actions taken, e.g. Fathers4Justice.
- Ideological outsiders – groups that prefer to distance themselves from the government for ideological reasons. For example, Amnesty International avoids forging close relationships with governments in order to present itself as a neutral, objective organisation, and many alter-globalisation protests may not wish to become part of the government as they see it as part of the problem at hand.

== Issues with classifications ==
There are issues with both types of classification. In attempting to distinguish between those who campaign for their own interests (sectional groups) and those who campaign for a political cause that is not directly in their own interests (cause groups), the group–cause typology ignores the scale or status of groups, and also ignores the fact that many advocacy groups do both; for example, teaching unions such as the NUT and NASUWT serve not only in their interests, but also campaign to raise awareness and promote reform and developments in governmental education policy.

The insider–outsider typology partially addresses the issues inherent in categorising advocacy groups by their aims, but ignores the fact that some groups may differ in being insiders or outsiders dependent on the government of the day, and does not mention the fact that many outsider groups can quickly become insider groups and vice versa (see: Overton window). For example, Charter 88 was clearly an outsider group prior to the 1997 general election, but assumed more influence following Labour's victory that year.

Wyn Grant mentions that, in contrast, the National Farmers' Union insider status was threatened following control of Britain's agricultural policy by the European Union and a period of 13 years whereby the Labour Party was in opposition. Consequently, she says that it is more appropriate to divide insider groups into "high profile" insiders and "captive" or "prisoner" groups. "High profile" insider groups attract the attention of the media alongside working with government, "captive" or "insider" groups are reliant solely on the government for their survival because the government played a part in their creation – e.g. the Equality and Human Rights Commission was established under the Equality Act 2006.

Richard Heffernan argues that both organised and disorganised social movements, such as those campaigning for gender, racial and sexual equality or for the civil, political and social rights of those being discriminated against can be influential on sectional groups (such as trade unions, professional associations and trade organisations) as well as cause groups. Although social movements differ from pressure groups – as they are generally not centrally organised and reflect broader societal shifts – social movements can bring together elements of various pressure groups and political parties; for example, Green politics in the United Kingdom can bring together pressure groups such as Greenpeace and the Soil Association, alongside political parties such as the Green Party; the Green Party however denies that it is a single-issue political party, and has a manifesto including a wide range of non-ecologically related issues.

== See also ==
- List of pressure groups in the United Kingdom
- Lobbying
