= Fair Trading Tribunal of New South Wales =

The Fair Trading Tribunal of New South Wales was a tribunal that had jurisdiction to deal with consumer disputes in New South Wales. It was established on 1 March 1999 and it was abolished on 25 February 2002.

== History ==
The tribunal was created to take over the functions of the Commercial Tribunal of New South Wales, the Consumer Claims Tribunal of New South Wales, the Building Disputes Tribunal of New South Wales, and the Motor Vehicle Repairs Disputes Committee of New South Wales. A review in 1997 was prompted by the New South Wales Government's concern to ensure that all of those tribunals were operating both fairly and efficiently, and were providing a system of dispute resolution that was meeting those objectives [Second Reading speech Mr Whelan in the New South Wales Legislative Assembly on 20 October 1998].

The key reform to the former tribunals was to increase efficiency and effectiveness through a common membership structure of one tribunal, the elimination of duplicated registry services, and an improved capacity to co-ordinate proceedings and the potential to better utilise resources. In addition, it was hoped it would avoid overlap between jurisdictions and reduce artificial distinctions and confusion for the community where a number of tribunals had concurrent jurisdiction…

The volume, speciality and nature of disputes in the residential area were such that the maintenance of a separate Residential Tribunal of New South Wales was justified.

== Jurisdiction ==
The tribunal was established under Fair Trading Tribunal Act 1998 (NSW). The actual jurisdiction of the tribunal was conferred by other legislation, for example, the Fair Trading Act 1987 or the Home Building Act.

The tribunal's jurisdiction also included a number of stand-alone adjudicative functions, such as the jurisdiction of the Director-General of the Department of Fair Trading and the Motor Vehicle Repair Disputes Committee to deal with disputes between consumers and motor dealers; the jurisdiction conferred on the Director-General of the Department of Fair Trading by the Property, Stock and Business Agents Act 1941 to review commissions and fees rendered by licensees; and consumer claims for compensation rejected by the travel compensation fund trustees which are currently reviewed by a specially convened committee appointed by the Minister.

== Organisation ==
The Fair Trading Tribunal was organised into 4 divisions, namely a Commercial Division, a Home Building Division, a Motor Vehicles Division, and a Consumer Claims Division. As mentioned previously, residential matters were kept separately in the Residential Tribunal.

The tribunal was to conduct proceedings with as little formality and technicality and with as much expedition as the requirements of the case permitted. The tribunal was not bound by the rules of evidence and it had the discretion to inform itself as it thought fit.

A party to a dispute had the carriage of his or her own case. However, the tribunal had the discretion to allow representation where it was appropriate. Factors such as the value of the matters, the complexity or capacity of parties to present their own case were considered when deciding whether representation should be allowed.

== Appeals ==
Parties to a dispute could seek the leave of the tribunal for an internal rehearing. Specific grounds had to be satisfied to exercise this option. This was intended to prevent the tribunal from being inundated with unmeritorious applications for rehearings.

Appeals on questions of law continued to be available to the Supreme Court of New South Wales.

== Abolition ==
The legislation for the tribunal required a review to be conducted two years after commencement. Following that review, it was recommended that the tribunal and the Residential Tribunal be merged. The New South Wales government decided to establish the new tribunal in 2000. The tribunal was replaced by the Consumer Tenancy and Trader Tribunal of New South Wales.

== Caseload ==
According to its Annual Review, In the 2000-2001 financial year, the Fair Trading Tribunal received about 13,500 applications.
