= Consumer, Trader and Tenancy Tribunal of New South Wales =

Former administrative tribunal in New South Wales, Australia

The Consumer, Trader and Tenancy Tribunal of New South Wales was a tribunal that specialised in resolving consumer disputes in New South Wales, a state of Australia. The tribunal had concurrent jurisdiction in respect of certain consumer claims with the normal civil courts of New South Wales. In other areas of consumer law, it had exclusive jurisdiction. It was created on 25 February 2002 and ceased to function on 31 December 2013, its function assumed by the New South Wales Civil and Administrative Tribunal (NCAT).

== Current jurisdictional error issues for NCAT ==
In February 2017, the New South Wales Court of Appeal issued a declaration that the NSW Administrative and Civil Tribunal (NCAT) (which handles a range of small civil disputes), has no jurisdiction if one party lives in another state. This issue is currently under discussion in the NSW Parliament and is likely to be subject to amending legislation shortly.

== History ==
The tribunal was created by the Consumer, Trader and Tenancy Tribunal Act 2001 (NSW). It replaced the former Fair Trading Tribunal of New South Wales and the Residential Tribunal of New South Wales. The former tribunals had been criticised in the New South Wales Parliament for being unresponsive and slow. The current tribunal is the latest attempt to improve consumer dispute resolution in New South Wales.

== Constitution ==
The tribunal consists of a Chairperson and Deputy Chairpersons. Senior Members and Members are also appointed to the tribunal. Senior members hear more complex cases. The tribunal may also use assessors to determine particular issues. Assessors are generally experts in the field that there is a dispute in.

== Structure ==
The Tribunal has eight Divisions, i.e. General, Motor Vehicles, Tenancy, Home Building, Commercial, Strata and Community Schemes, Residential Parks, and Retirement Villages. Some of the Divisions limit the amount of money that may be claimed (e.g. $25,000 in the General Division and $500,000 in the Home Building Division), but others have no upper limit.

Registries of the tribunal are located in Sydney, Parramatta, Hurstville, Penrith, Liverpool, Newcastle, Wollongong and Tamworth. Applications may lodged at those registries.

The tribunal also sits at other country venues depending on the amount of work in those areas.

== Divisional structure ==
The General Division dealt with consumer claims in relation to goods and services, which may include faulty goods and work by traders not performed properly. The tribunal could award a maximum of $25,000.

The Motor Vehicles Division handled disputes about new and used motor vehicles (including motor boats) and repairs. There was no maximum claim in the vehicle is new and used for private use.

The Tenancy Division dealt with breaches of leases, excessive rent increases, termination of the rental agreement, and the return of rental bonds. An order could be made up to $20,000 with respect to a rental bond or $10,000 for other matters.

The Home Building Division dealt with matters under The Home Building Act 1989 (NSW). The tribunal had jurisdiction to $500,000.

The Commercial Division dealt with disputes over credit contracts under the Consumer Credit (New South Wales) Act 1995 (NSW)(which is also known nationally in Australia as the Consumer Credit Code of Australia) and the Credit Act 1984. The Division also dealt with disputes over the licensing and conduct of travel agents under the Travel Agents Act 1986 (NSW), and commission fees charged by real estate agents licensed under the Property, Stock and Business Agents Act 1941 (NSW).

The Strata and Community Schemes Division dealt with disputes under the Strata Schemes Management Act 1996 (NSW). These disputes related to strata by-laws, maintenance levies, reallocation of unit entitlements, and alterations to common property.

The Retirement Villages Division dealt with disputes under the Retirement Villages Act 1999 (NSW). It dealt with issues such the terms of a retirement village contract, the legality of a village rule, and the sale or lease of premises by a resident.

The Residential Parks Division dealt with disputes under the Residential Parks Act 1998 (NSW). Issues for dispute may involve the terms of the residential tenancy agreement, notices of termination, alterations and additions to dwellings, rent issues, rental bonds, and so on. The Residential Parks Division was rather unusual as it is one of the few divisions that had group hearings. Group hearings often have large numbers of applicants, and these applicants are usually represented by an advocate. These advocates normally work for organisations like the Tenants Advice Services, the Affiliated Residential Park Residents Association or the Northern Alliance of Park Residents Association.

== Procedure ==
Parties were normally expected to run their own cases and pay their own costs, although legal representatives are allowed and costs could be awarded in certain circumstances. These restrictions were intended to make the Tribunal process quick, informal and affordable. Parties usually appeared in person, but could also appear by telephone in certain circumstances.

== Review ==
A party who disagreed with the determination of the Tribunal could apply for a rehearing if specific criteria were met. An appeal could be lodged with the District Court of New South Wales on a question of law.

== Peer Review Panel ==
The Peer Review Panel consisted of the two Deputy Chairpersons and one other person appointed by the Minister for Fair Trading. The panel reviewed matters referred to it by the Chairperson, Director-General of the Department of Fair Trading or the Minister, and in due course, provided advice in response. Matters considered by the Panel could include the investigation of complaints against Members, taking disciplinary action against them, and the educational and training needs of Members.
