= Scilly Now & Then =

Isles of Scilly community magazine

Scilly Now & Then is a community magazine distributed throughout the Isles of Scilly. It was launched in the spring of 2006.

== Content ==
The magazine is aimed at both locals and visitors. Local interest contributions are submitted by numerous public bodies including the police, harbourmaster, Five Islands School, fire service, health centre, local AONB and Member of Parliament, Derek Thomas. There are also contributions from the local RSPB officer and Chairman of the Council of the Isles of Scilly. Historical content includes regular features on local shipwrecks from diver Todd Stevens, maritime history from Richard Larn OBE and Professor Wyn Grant from the University of Warwick provides information from The National Archives in Kew and wildlife expert Will Wagstaff provides information on the variety of birds on the islands. Editorial contributions from both the local community and visitors are encouraged and there are regular items including a recipe, details on the night sky, a quiz and poetry submissions. There is also a letters page. A key function of the publication is to support the islands as an outstanding visitor destination so when controversial subjects are raised the editorial policy is to seek both sides of the argument. Scilly Now & Then has featured several interviews with celebrities including Bill Bryson, Brian Cox, Susie Dent and Bill Oddie.

== Distribution ==
Distribution varies owing to the seasonal aspect of life on the islands with around 2000 copies in the winter months and up to 5,000 in peak season. Releases are titled Spring, April, May, June, July, August, Autumn and Winter and copies are supplied to a variety of outlets throughout the islands including the Tourist Information Centre, shops, library, museum and airport.

== Funding ==
Scilly Now & Then relies almost entirely on local advertising although some extra revenue is generated from visitors who pay a small fee to have the magazine sent to their home.
