= Will Wagstaff =

British ornithologist and naturalist

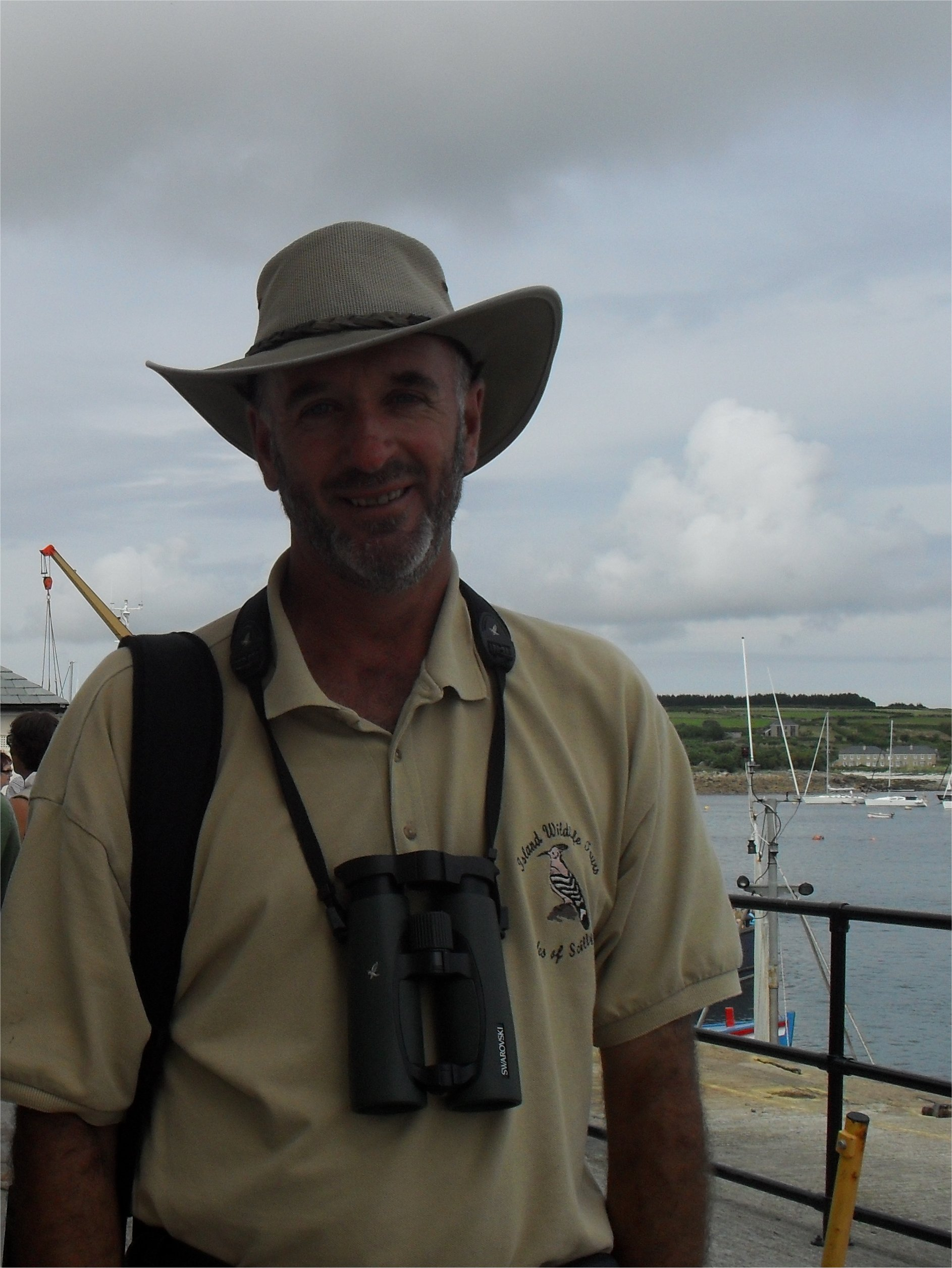
Wagstaff on the Hugh Town quay on St Mary's, Isles of Scilly, 2010

William Wagstaff, commonly known as Will Wagstaff, is a British ornithologist and naturalist in the Isles of Scilly, and also an author. His popular guided wildlife walks have made him both a well-known and popular figure in the islands. Originally from South Wales, Wagstaff has lived on the Isles of Scilly since 1981. He has had an active role in conservation work around the islands for more than 20 years, and has led guided wildlife walks there since 1985. He is currently Honorary President and Chairman of the Isles of Scilly Bird Group and regularly presents slideshows and leads other events on the islands. He also writes a regular column A Walk on the Wild Side for the local magazine Scilly Now & Then. He is a Tour Leader for Island Holidays and runs the Island Wildlife Tours group. He is part of the Travelling Naturalist group.

Wagstaff also works in other parts of the world, such as Florida in the US and the Falkland Islands.

== TV appearances and radio broadcasts ==
- Wagstaff has appeared as a local wildlife expert on several TV programmes, including This Morning, Three Men in a Boat and Wild Britain

He also makes regular appearances on Radio Scilly, presenting two weekly shows, Walk of the Week and Birdwatching Report

== Publications ==
- Falkland Islands: The Bradt Travel Guide (2003). ISBN 978-1841620374.
- Isles of Scilly Bird & Natural History Review 2007 (2008)
