= Wyn Grant =

British political scientist

Wyn Grant (born 1947) is a British political scientist and professor of politics at the University of Warwick. He was chair (2002–2005) and president (2005–2008) of the Political Studies Association (PSA). Wyn Grant is a graduate of the universities of Leicester, Strathclyde and Exeter. In 2010 he was presented with the Diamond Jubilee Lifetime Achievement award of the Political Studies Association of the UK at their Awards Ceremony. He was elected an Academician of the Academy of Social Sciences in 2011.

Grant has written extensively on pressure groups and conceived the distinction between insider and outsider pressure groups in Pressure Groups, Politics and Democracy in Britain (1989). He has also been involved in work on the EU on the Common Agricultural Policy.

Grant is also a regular visitor to the Isles of Scilly and writes a regular column From the Archive for the local magazine Scilly Now & Then based on research at the National Archive at Kew.

He is a noted Charlton Athletic fan who runs the popular Addicks Diary blog.
