= Advocacy group =

Groups using advocacy in order to influence public opinion and policy

Advocacy groups, also known as lobby groups, interest groups, special interest groups, pressure groups, public associations, government relations firms, or lobbying firms and in some cases public affirms firms, use various forms of advocacy or lobbying to influence public opinion and ultimately public policy. They play an important role in the development of political and social systems.

Motives for action may be based on political, economic, religious, moral, commercial or common good-based positions. Groups use varied methods to try to achieve their aims, including lobbying, media campaigns, awareness raising publicity stunts, polls, research, and policy briefings. Some groups are supported or backed by powerful business or political interests and exert considerable influence on the political process, while others have few or no such resources.

Some have developed into important social, and political institutions or social movements. Some powerful advocacy groups have been accused of manipulating the democratic system for narrow commercial gain, and in some instances have been found guilty of corruption, fraud, bribery, influence peddling and other serious crimes. Some groups, generally the ones with less financial resources, may use direct action and civil disobedience, and in some cases are accused of being a threat to the social order or "domestic extremists". Research is beginning to explore how advocacy groups use social media to facilitate civic engagement, and collective action.

== History in Great Britain ==
=== Beginnings ===
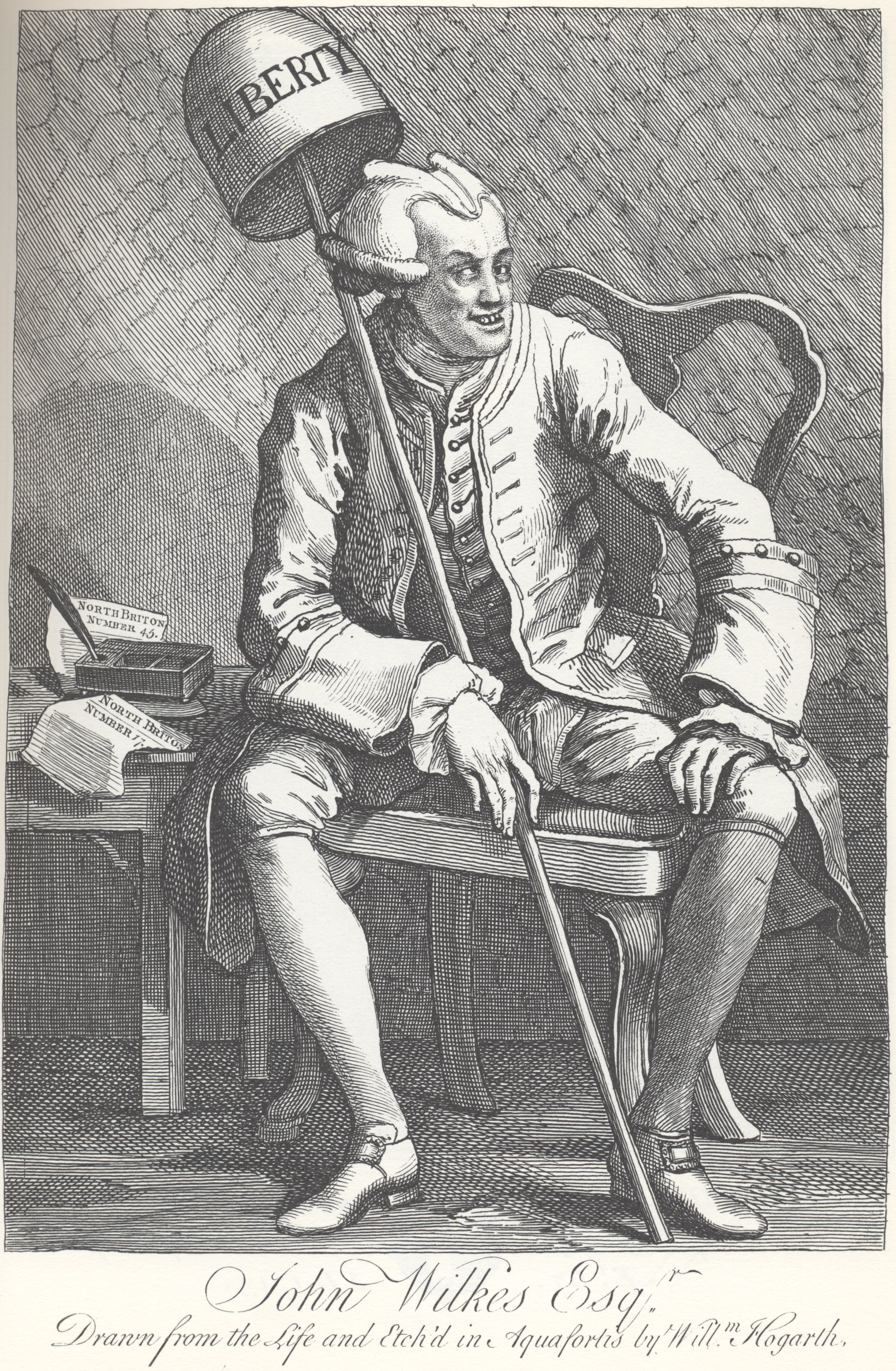
Satirical engraving of Wilkes by William Hogarth. On the table beside Wilkes lies two editions of The North Briton.

The early growth of pressure groups was connected to broad economic and political changes in England in the mid-18th century, including political representation, market capitalization, and proletarianization. The first mass social movement catalyzed around the controversial political figure, John Wilkes. As editor of the paper The North Briton, Wilkes vigorously attacked the new administration of Lord Bute and the peace terms that the new government accepted at the 1763 Treaty of Paris at the end of the Seven Years' War. Charged with seditious libel, Wilkes was arrested after the issue of a general warrant, a move that Wilkes denounced as unlawful – the Lord Chief Justice eventually ruled in Wilkes favour. As a result of this episode, Wilkes became a figurehead to the growing movement for popular sovereignty among the middle classes – people began chanting, "Wilkes and Liberty" in the streets.

After a later period of exile, brought about by further charges of libel and obscenity, Wilkes stood for the Parliamentary seat at Middlesex, where most of his support was located. When Wilkes was imprisoned in the King's Bench Prison on 10 May 1768, a mass movement of support emerged, with large demonstrations in the streets under the slogan "No liberty, no King." Stripped of the right to sit in Parliament, Wilkes became an Alderman of London in 1769, and an activist group called the Society for the Supporters of the Bill of Rights began aggressively promoting his policies. This was the first ever sustained social advocacy group – it involved public meetings, demonstrations, the distribution of pamphlets on an unprecedented scale and the mass petition march. However, the movement was careful not to cross the line into open rebellion – it tried to rectify the faults in governance through appeals to existing legal precedents and was conceived of as an extra-Parliamentary form of agitation to arrive at a consensual and constitutional arrangement. The force and influence of this social advocacy movement on the streets of London compelled the authorities to concede to the movement's demands. Wilkes was returned to Parliament, general warrants were declared as unconstitutional and press freedom was extended to the coverage of Parliamentary debates.

Another important advocacy group that emerged in the late 18th century was the British abolitionist movement against slavery. Starting with an organised sugar boycott in 1791, it led the second great petition drive of 1806, which brought about the banning of the slave trade in 1807. In the opinion of Eugene Black (1963), "...association made possible the extension of the politically effective public. Modern extra parliamentary political organization is a product of the late eighteenth century [and] the history of the age of reform cannot be written without it.

=== Growth and spread ===
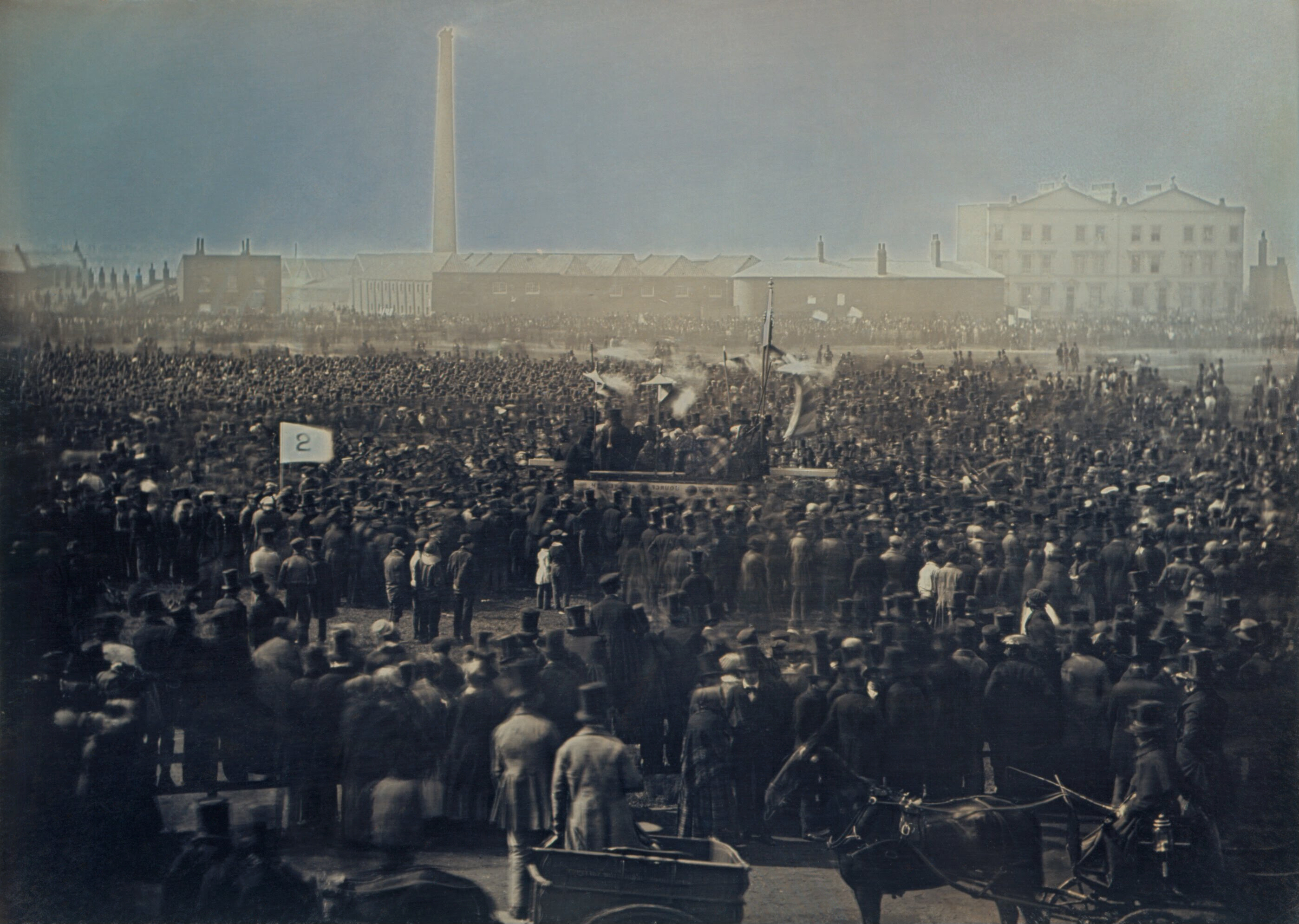
The Great Chartist Meeting on Kennington Common, London in 1848

From 1815, Britain after victory in the Napoleonic Wars entered a period of social upheaval characterised by the growing maturity of the use of social movements and special-interest associations. Chartism was the first mass movement of the growing working-class in the world. It campaigned for political reform between 1838 and 1848 with the People's Charter of 1838 as its manifesto – this called for universal suffrage and the implementation of the secret ballot, amongst other things. The term "social movements" was introduced in 1848 by the German Sociologist Lorenz von Stein in his book Socialist and Communist Movements since the Third French Revolution (1848) in which he introduced the term "social movement" into scholarly discussions – actually depicting in this way political movements fighting for the social rights understood as welfare rights.

The labor movement and socialist movement of the late 19th century are seen as the prototypical social movements, leading to the formation of communist and social democratic parties and organisations. These tendencies were seen in poorer countries as pressure for reform continued, for example in Russia with the Russian Revolution of 1905 and of 1917, resulting in the collapse of the Czarist regime around the end of the First World War.

In the post-war period, women's rights, gay rights, peace, civil rights, anti-nuclear and environmental movements emerged, often dubbed the New Social Movements, some of which may be considered "general interest groups" as opposed to special interest groups. They led, among other things, to the formation of green parties and organisations influenced by the new left. Some find in the end of the 1990s the emergence of a new global social movement, the anti-globalization movement. Some social movement scholars posit that with the rapid pace of globalization, the potential for the emergence of new type of social movement is latent—they make the analogy to national movements of the past to describe what has been termed a global citizens movement.

== United States ==
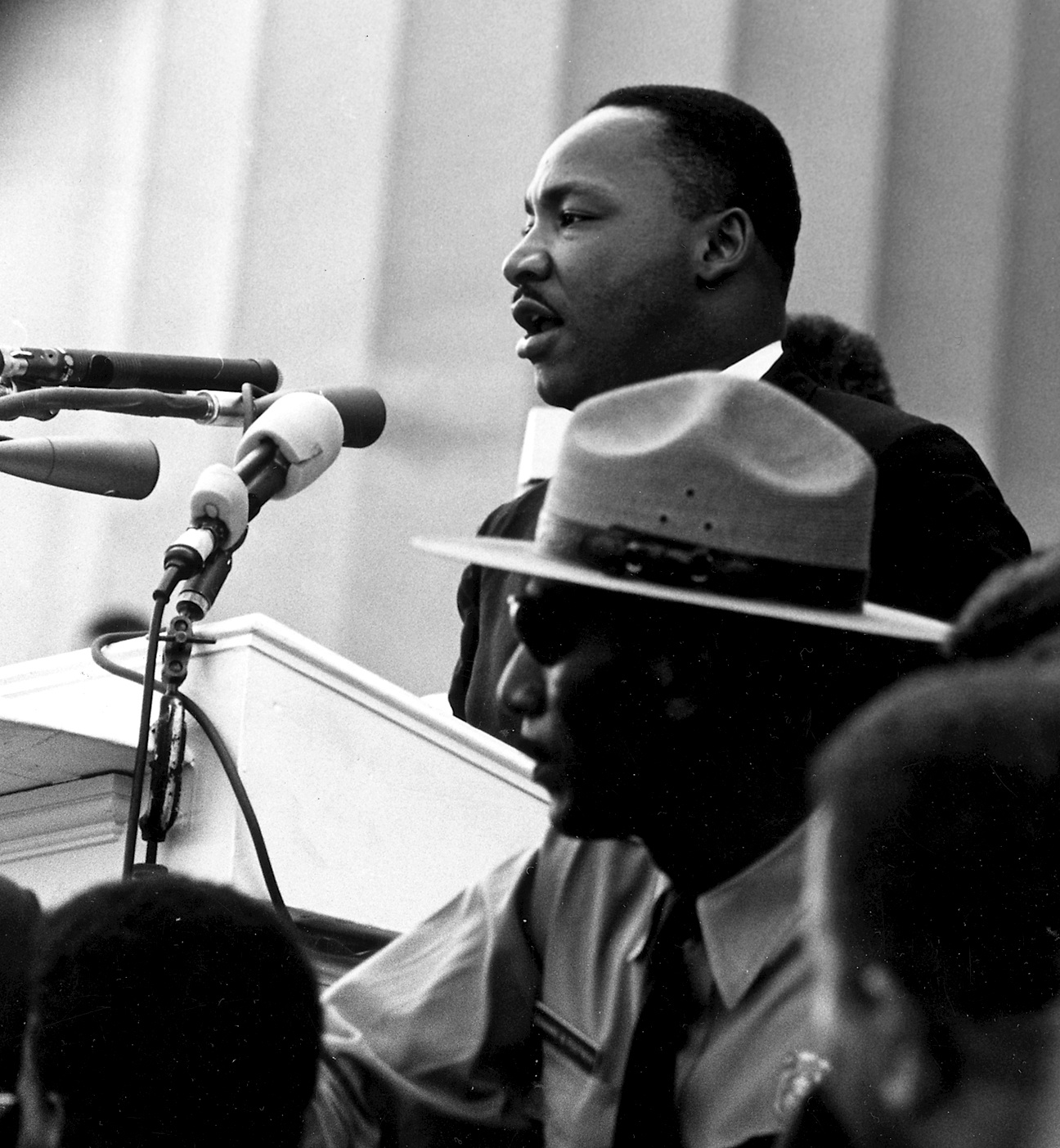
Martin Luther King Jr. led the civil rights movement, one of the most famous social movements of the 20th century.

According to Stuart McConnell:

The Grand Army of the Republic, the largest of all Union Army veterans' organizations, was the most powerful single-issue political lobby of the late nineteenth century, securing massive pensions for veterans and helping to elect five postwar presidents from its own membership. To its members, it was also a secret fraternal order, a source of local charity, a provider of entertainment in small municipalities, and a patriotic organization.

== Activities ==
Advocacy groups exist in a wide variety of genres based upon their most pronounced activities.

- Anti-defamation organizations issue responses or criticisms to real or supposed slights of any sort (including speech or violence) by an individual or group against a specific segment of the population which the organization exists to represent.
- Watchdog groups exist to provide oversight and rating of actions or media by various outlets, both government and corporate. They may also index personalities, organizations, products, and activities in databases to provide coverage and rating of the value or viability of such entities to target demographics.
- Lobby groups lobby for a change to the law or the maintenance of a particular law, while big businesses fund very significant lobbying efforts that influence legislators, as seen in the US and in the UK where lobbying first developed. Some Lobby groups have considerable financial resources at their disposal. Lobbying is regulated to stop the worst abuses which can develop into corruption. In the United States the Internal Revenue Service makes a clear distinction between lobbying and advocacy.
- Lobby groups spend considerable amounts of money on election advertising as well. For example, the 2011 documentary film Hot Coffee contains interviews of former Mississippi Supreme Court Justice Oliver E. Diaz Jr. and evidence the US Chamber of Commerce paid for advertising to unseat him.
- Legal defense funds provide financial support for the legal defense or legal actions taken on behalf of individuals or groups aligned with their specific interests or target demographic. This is often accompanied by one of the above types of advocacy groups filing an amicus curiae if the cause at stake serves the interests of both the legal defense fund and the other advocacy groups.
- Astroturfing groups mask the sponsors of a message or organization (e.g., political, advertising, religious or public relations) to make it appear as though it originates from and is supported by grassroots participants. It is a practice intended to give the statements or organizations credibility by withholding information about the source's financial connection.
- Media advocacy groups use mass media to advocate the incorporation of equitable public policies- particularly policies aimed at benefiting historically marginalized communities.

== Influence ==
In most liberal democracies, advocacy groups tend to use the bureaucracy as the main channel of influence – because, in liberal democracies, this is where the decision-making power lies. The aim of advocacy groups here is to attempt to influence a member of the legislature to support their cause by voting a certain way in the legislature. Access to this channel is generally restricted to groups with insider status such as large corporations and trade unions – groups with outsider status are unlikely to be able to meet with ministers or other members of the bureaucracy to discuss policy. What must be understood about groups exerting influence in the bureaucracy is; "the crucial relationship here [in the bureaucracy] is usually that between the senior bureaucrats and leading business or industrial interests". This supports the view that groups with greater financial resources at their disposal will generally be better able to influence the decision-making process of government. The advantages that large businesses have is mainly due to the fact that they are key producers within their countries economy and, therefore, their interests are important to the government as their contributions are important to the economy. According to George Monbiot, the influence of big business has been strengthened by "the greater ease with which corporations can relocate production and investment in a global economy". This suggests that in the ever modernising world, big business has an increasing role in influencing the bureaucracy and in turn, the decision-making process of government.

Advocacy groups can also exert influence through the assembly by lobbying. Groups with greater economic resources at their disposal can employ professional lobbyists to try and exert influence in the assembly. An example of such a group is the environmentalist group Greenpeace; Greenpeace (an organisation with income upward of $50,000,000) use lobbying to gain political support for their campaigns. They raise issues about the environment with the aim of having their issues translated into policy such as the government encouraging alternative energy and recycling.

The judicial branch of government can also be used by advocacy groups to exert influence. In states where legislation cannot be challenged by the courts, like the UK, advocacy groups are limited in the amount of influence they have. In states that have codified constitutions, like the US, however, advocacy group influence is much more significant. For example, in 1954 the NAACP (National Association for the Advancement of Colored People) lobbied against the Topeka Board of education, arguing that segregation of education based on race was unconstitutional. As a result of group pressure from the NAACP, the supreme court unanimously ruled that racial segregation in education was indeed unconstitutional and such practices were banned. This is a novel example of how advocacy groups can exert influence in the judicial branch of government.

Advocacy groups can also exert influence on political parties. The main way groups do this is through campaign finance. For instance; in the UK, the conservative parties campaigns are often funded by large corporations, as many of the conservative parties campaigns reflect the interests of businesses. For example, George W. Bush's re-election campaign in 2004 was the most expensive in American history and was financed mainly by large corporations and industrial interests that the Bush administration represented in government. Conversely, left-wing parties are often funded by organised labour – when the British Labour Party was formed, it was largely funded by trade unions. Often, political parties are actually formed as a result of group pressure, for example, the Labour Party in the UK was formed out of the new trade union movement which lobbied for the rights of workers.

Advocacy groups also exert influence through channels that are separate from the government or the political structure such as the mass media and through public opinion campaigning. Advocacy groups will use methods such as protesting, petitioning and civil disobedience to attempt to exert influence in Liberal Democracies. Groups will generally use two distinct styles when attempting to manipulate the media – they will either put across their outsider status and use their inability to access the other channels of influence to gain sympathy or they may put across a more ideological agenda. Traditionally, a prime example of such a group were the trade-unions who were the so-called "industrial" muscle. Trade-unions would campaign in the forms of industrial action and marches for workers rights, these gained much media attention and sympathy for their cause. In the United States, the Civil Rights Movement gained much of its publicity through civil disobedience; African Americans would simply disobey the racist segregation laws to get the violent, racist reaction from the police and white Americans. This violence and racism was then broadcast all over the world, showing the world just how one sided the race 'war' in America actually was.

Advocacy group influence has also manifested itself in supranational bodies that have arisen through globalisation. Groups that already had a global structure such as Greenpeace were better able to adapt to globalisation. Greenpeace, for example, has offices in over 30 countries and has an income of $50 million annually. Groups such as these have secured the nature of their influence by gaining status as nongovernmental organisations (NGOs), many of which oversee the work of the UN and the EU from their permanent offices in America and Europe. Group pressure by supranational industries can be exerted in a number of ways: "through direct lobbying by large corporations, national trade bodies and 'peak' associations such as the European Round Table of Industrialists".

Advocacy groups can influence policies away from the median voter.

== Influential advocacy groups ==
There have been many significant advocacy groups throughout history, some of which could operated with dynamics that could better categorize them as social movements. Here are some notable advocacy groups operating in different parts of the world:

- American Civil Liberties Union (ACLU), described as a legal nonprofit organization that, according to the organization's website, "works in the courts, legislatures, and communities to defend and preserve the individual rights and liberties guaranteed to all people in this country by the Constitution and laws of the United States." With its national headquarters in New York, the ACLU has autonomous affiliates in each of the 50 states, Washington, D.C., and Puerto Rico.
- American Israel Public Affairs Committee (AIPAC), the American Israel lobby, which is described by The New York Times as the "most influential Lobby impacting US relations with Israel."
- British Medical Association, which formed at a meeting of 50 doctors in 1832 for the sharing of knowledge; its lobbying led to the Medical Act 1858 and the formation of the General Medical Council which has registered and regulated doctors in the UK to this date.
- Campaign for Nuclear Disarmament, which has advocated the non-proliferation of nuclear weapons and unilateral nuclear disarmament in the UK since 1957, and whose logo is now an international peace symbol.
- Center for Auto Safety, an organization formed in 1970 which aims to give consumers a voice for auto safety and quality in the United States.
- Communion and Liberation (Italian: Comunione e Liberazione), it created a lot of conflicts of interest in many private and public companies in Italy since the 1970s and it has been investigated by Italian authorities for many legal issues regarding bribery, corruption and frauds.
- Drug Policy Alliance, whose principal goal is to end the American "war on drugs".
- Electronic Frontier Foundation, an international non-profit digital rights advocacy and legal organization based in the United States.
- Energy Lobby, an umbrella term for the representatives of large oil, gas, coal, and electric utilities corporations that attempt to influence governmental policy in the United States.
- Financial Services Roundtable, an organization representing the banking lobby.
- Greenpeace, an organization formed in 1970 as the Don't Make a Wave Committee to stop nuclear weapons testing in the United States.
- The Human Rights Campaign, an LGBT civil rights advocacy and lobbying organization seeking to advance the cause of LGBT rights in America.
- The Middle East Treaty Organization (METO), whose draft treaty process led to the UN General Assembly convening an annual meeting of Member States on establishing a zone free of weapons of mass destruction (WMDFZ) in the Middle East.
- National Rifle Association of America (NRA), an organization that formed in New York in 1871 to promote marksmanship.
- Oxfam, an organization formed in 1942 in the UK as the Oxford Committee for Famine Relief.
- Pennsylvania Abolition Society, which formed in Philadelphia in 1775 with a mission to abolish slavery in the United States.
- People for the Ethical Treatment of Animals (PETA), an animal rights organization that focuses primarily on the treatment of animals on factory farms, in the clothing trade, in laboratories, and in the entertainment industry.
- Royal Society for the Protection of Birds, founded in Manchester in 1889 to campaign against the "barbarous trade in plumes for women's hats".
- Sierra Club, which formed in 1892 to help protect the Sierra Nevada.
- Stop the War Coalition, an organization against the war on terrorism, which organized a march of between 750,000 and 2,000,000 people in London in 2003.
- Suffragettes, which sought to gain voting rights for women through direct action and hunger strikes from 1865 to 1928 in the United Kingdom.
- The Affiliated Residential Park Residents Association Incorporated (ARPRA), which was established in 1986 to represent residents of residential parks in New South Wales, Australia.
- Sunday School movement, which formed circa 1751 to promote universal schooling in the UK.
- Tory Party ("Tories"), which formed in 1678 to fight the British Exclusion Bill and developed into one of the first political parties; now known as the Conservative Party.
- US Chamber of Commerce, by far the biggest lobby group in the US by expenditures.

== Adversarial groupings ==
On some controversial issues there are a number of competing advocacy groups, sometimes with very different resources available to them:

- Abortion-rights vs anti-abortion movements (abortion policy in the United States)
- SPEAK campaign vs Pro-Test (animal testing in United Kingdom)
- The Automobile Association vs Pedestrians' Association (now 'Living Streets') (road safety in the United Kingdom since 1929)
- Tobacco Institute vs Action on Smoking and Health (tobacco legislation)
- Flying Matters vs Plane Stupid (aviation policy in the United Kingdom since 2007)
- Pit Bull Advocates vs Pitbull Attack Victim Advocates (members of the first group, such as Animal Farm Foundation and Best Friends Animal Society, are against breed-specific legislation (BSL) while members of the second group, such as National Pitbull Awareness, DogsBite.org, and PETA, are for BSL)

== Incentives ==
=== Free rider problem ===
A general theory is that individuals must be enticed with some type of benefit to join an interest group. However, the free rider problem addresses the difficulty of obtaining members of a particular interest group when the benefits are already reaped without membership. For instance, an interest group dedicated to improving farming standards will fight for the general goal of improving farming for every farmer, even those who are not members of that particular interest group. Thus, there is no real incentive to join an interest group and pay dues if the farmer will receive that benefit anyway. For another example, every individual in the world would benefit from a cleaner environment, but environmental protection interest groups do not receive monetary help from every individual in the world.

This poses a problem for interest groups, which require dues from their members and contributions in order to accomplish the groups' agendas.

=== Selective benefits ===
Selective benefits are material, rather than monetary benefits conferred on group members. For instance, an interest group could give members free or discounted travel, meals, or periodical subscriptions. Many trade and professional interest groups tend to give these types of benefits to their members.

=== Solidarity incentives ===
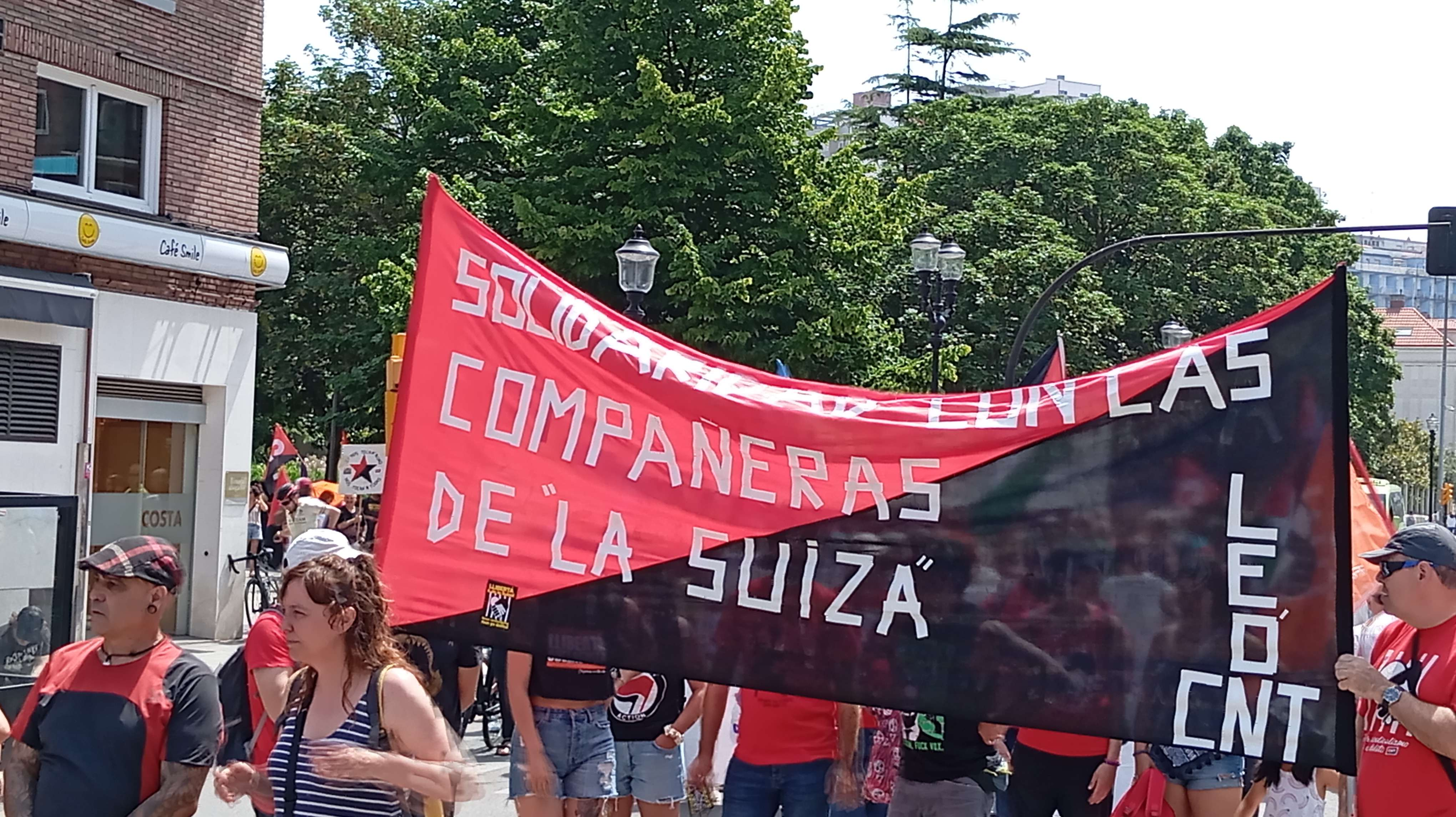
Anarchist protest for trade union action, 29 June 2025

A solidarity incentive is a reward for participation that is socially derived and created out of the act of association. Examples include "socializing congeniality, the sense of group membership and identification, the status resulting from membership, fun, conviviality, the maintenance of social distinctions, and so on.

=== Expressive incentives ===
People who join an interest group because of expressive benefits likely joined to express an ideological or moral value that they believe in, such as free speech, civil rights, economic justice, or political equality. To obtain these types of benefits, members would simply pay dues, and donate their time or money to get a feeling of satisfaction from expressing a political value. Also, it would not matter if the interest group achieved their goal; these members would merely be able to say they helped out in the process of trying to obtain their goals, which is the expressive incentive that they got in the first place. The types of interest groups that rely on expressive benefits or incentives are environmental groups and groups who claim to be lobbying for the public interest.

== Theoretical perspectives ==
Much work has been undertaken by academics attempting to categorize how advocacy groups operate, particularly in relation to governmental policy creation. The field is dominated by numerous and diverse schools of thought:

- Pluralism: This is based upon the understanding that advocacy groups operate in competition with one another and play a key role in the political system. They do this by acting as a counterweight to undue concentrations of power.

However, this pluralist theory (formed primarily by American academics) reflects a more open and fragmented political system similar to that in countries such as the United States.

- Neo-pluralism: Under neo-pluralism, a concept of political communities developed that is more similar to the British form of government. This is based on the concept of political communities in that advocacy groups and other such bodies are organised around a government department and its network of client groups. The members of this network co-operate together during the policy making process.
- Corporatism or elitism: Some advocacy groups are backed by private businesses which can have a considerable influence on legislature.

There are three broad perspectives on how special interest groups achieve influence: through quid pro quo exchange, information transmission, and subsidizing policymaking.

== Social media use ==
Apart from lobbying and other methods of asserting political presence, advocacy groups use social media to attract attention towards their particular cause. A study published in early 2012 suggests that advocacy groups of varying political and ideological orientations operating in the United States are using social media to interact with citizens every day. The study surveyed 53 groups, that were found to be using a variety of social media technologies to achieve organizational and political goals:

- Facebook was the social media site of choice with all but one group noting that they use the site to connect with citizens.
- Twitter was also popular with all but two groups saying that they use Twitter.
- Other social media being used included YouTube, LinkedIn, wikis, Flickr, Jumo, Diigo, Tumblr, Foursquare, Identi.ca, Picasa, and Vimeo.

As noted in the study, "while some groups raised doubts about social media's ability to overcome the limitations of weak ties and generational gaps, an overwhelming majority of groups see social media as essential to contemporary advocacy work and laud its democratizing function."

Another 2012 study argued that advocacy groups use social media to reach audiences unrelated to the communities they help and to mobilize diverse groups of people. Mobilization is achieved in four ways:

1. Social media help connect individuals to advocacy groups and thus can strengthen outreach efforts.
2. Social media help promote engagement as they enable engaging feedback loops.
3. Social media strengthen collective action efforts through an increased speed of communication.
4. Social media are cost-effective tools that enable advocacy organizations to do more for less."

While these studies show the acceptance of social media use by advocacy groups, populations not affiliated with media advocacy often question the benevolence of social media. Rather than exclusively fostering an atmosphere of camaraderie and universal understanding, social media can perpetuate power hierarchies. More specifically, social media can provide "a means of reproducing power and fulfilling group interest for those possessing excessive power... [having the potential to] indirectly reinforce elitist domination." By excluding those without access to the internet, social media inherently misrepresents populations- particularly the populations in low-income countries. Since media advocacy groups use social media as a way to boost the narratives of these populations, the effect of social media use can be counteractive to well-intentioned goals. Instead of directly amplifying the voices and narratives of historically marginalized populations, social media magnifies their concerns through the perspective of individuals with access to the internet.

Since advocacy groups have the agency to control a community's narrative through a social media post, they have the agency to control the deservedness of a community as well. That is, the amount of resources or attention a community receives largely depends on the kind of narrative an advocacy group curates for them on social media.

== See also ==
- Classification of advocacy groups
- Client politics
- Identity politics
- Lobbying
- Methods used by advocacy groups
- The New York Times Simulator
- Pressure groups in the United Kingdom
- Pressure politics
