= Richard Larn =

British shipwreck historian (1931–2026)

Richard James Vincent Larn, OBE (1 September 1931 – 14 January 2026) was a British Chief Petty Officer in the Royal Navy, businessman and maritime history writer who was widely regarded as one of Britain's leading historic shipwreck experts.

== Life and career ==
=== Early life and career at sea ===
Larn was born in Norfolk on 1 September 1931. He was raised in Great Yarmouth before being evacuated to Oxford during the Second World War, and went to a sea training school (TS. Mercury, Hamble) at the age of 14. Larn taught himself to dive in 1947, using a German-made Dräger U-boat escape set in the River Thames. He then joined the Merchant Navy where he served his apprenticeship as a deck-officer with the South American Saint Line and eventually became 2nd Mate. In 1950 he transferred to the Royal Navy where he stayed for 22 years. As a Chief Petty Officer Mechanician/diver he served in Korea and initiated diving from Dragonfly helicopters to recover ram-jet uncrewed gunnery target drone aircraft off Malta, being dropped into the sea wearing diving equipment with Petty Officer John Guppy, up to five miles offshore, to assist a rescue tug in recovering the targets intact. They were possibly the first divers in the Royal Navy to operate using diving apparatus from helicopters, long before SAR divers. He also participated in diving expeditions all over the world. Larn then specialised in air-launched weapons, Firestreak, Redtop, Sidewinder, Bullpup, Mk.43 and 44 homing torpedoes, and the 2000lb HEMC nuclear bomb, and was Chief Petty Officer i/c the Guided Weapons Section on board HMS Hermes for three years, which required Positive Security Vetting to Top Secret - Atomic.

In 1957 he became a BSAC member, and served as BSAC Deputy Diving Officer in 1961 and 1962. Larn was also among the instigating members of the Naval Air Command Sub Aqua Club (NATSAC), the Royal Navy Sub-Aqua Club, which was established in the early 1960s with Lieutenant Roy Graham as its first chairman, and Larn as its Diving Officer. One of the club's first major projects, initiated by Larn's extensive research into the Scilly naval disaster of 1707, was to send a team of Royal Navy divers, based on board the minesweeper HM/XSV Puttenham, to the Isles of Scilly off the coast of Cornwall to find an historic fleet of sunken Royal Navy ships, led by HMS Association, a 90-gun Second Rate Ship of the Line lost in the 1707 disaster. In 1964 about ten NACSAC members, including Larn, arrived on Scilly – thought at that time to be only the second group of divers ever to come there. Their initial dives sparked off a long chain of navy visits that continued for four years. The annual expedition in 1966 was announced as a search for the wreck of the Association. Plans to find it had existed before, but until then the dives in the Isles of Scilly had largely discovered modern wrecks. The divers could only get out to the Western Rocks, but hardly around the Gilstone Ledge, where a later expedition managed to locate the wreck of the Association in 1967; Larn was not present in 1967 having been given a "pier-head jump" at the last minute to HMS Bulwark in Singapore. However, on his return he led NACSAC for its 1969, 1970 and 1971 expeditions to the islands, before leaving the Royal Navy.

=== After the Navy ===
In 1972 Larn left the Royal Navy as a Chief Petty Officer/ Weapons Electrical Mechanician to pursue a career in private business. After two years as Works Director for Partech Electronics International Ltd, Charlestown, helping the Company to move to Cornwall from Wellyn Garden City, he then founded a commercial diving training centre Prodive Ltd. initially in the Long Store, Charlestown, then in Falmouth Docks, Cornwall, which aimed at improving the training standard of professional commercial deep sea divers in the oil and gas offshore industry. Prodive Ltd became one of only three diver training establishments in the UK approved to operate training to HSE Standards, and train Government sponsored students. In 1976 he established the Charlestown Shipwreck & Heritage Centre which grew out of his own collection of shipwreck artifacts which he ran until 1998 with his second wife, Bridget,. Living in Charlestown for 31 years, he was joint owner and curator of one of the largest collections of shipwreck artifacts on public display in Europe. Larn and his wife Bridget then moved to the Isles of Scilly in 1986, where they lived from 1986 to 1991 during which they set up and ran the Longstone Heritage Centre on the island of St. Mary's, retaining their interest in Charlestown. Lloyd's Register then offered Larn a ten-year writing contract to produce a multi-volume series recording known shipwrecks around Gt. Britain & Ireland, which necessitated he and his wife selling their business in the Scillies and move back to the mainland. In 1982 he sold his shares in Prodive Ltd to his partner, Roger Parker, and spent the next four years treasure hunting, leading successful expeditions to recover thousands of silver Lion Daalder coins from the Dutch East India Company ship Campen, sunk off the Needles, isle of Wight, and then copper ingots, artifacts and literally millions of copper coins from the English East Indiaman Admiral Gardner, on the Goodwin Sands, Kent. Other shipwreck projects concerned historic wrecks including the Coronation, Ramillies, Dartmouth, Schiedam, Dollar Cove, Santo Christo de Castello, and the St.Anthony. Larn was the Licensee for the Bartholomew Ledge wreck site, and the Tearing Ledge site (HMS Eagle) on the Isles of Scilly.

Together with his wife he has written over 65 books and countless articles on maritime history and archaeology, shipwrecks and the sea. Their 'Shipwreck Index of the British Isles'(Vol's 1-6) a monumental work with details of 45,000 ships, for Lloyd's Register of Shipping, was used by the Royal Commission for Historic Monuments (now English Heritage) to establish the NMR (National Maritime Record), followed by a similar record for both the Scottish and Welsh Governments.

In retirement, Larn was still active in diving, mostly in the Isles of Scilly where he contributed a regular column on maritime history in the local magazines Scilly Now & Then and the Scillonian Magazine. His other interests included figurehead and ship carving, and model making. When in 2007 the council of Scilly commemorated the 300th anniversary of the great naval disaster of 1707, Larn was among the principal organisers and also gave public lectures, as did Dava Sobel, author of Longitude, and Sir Arnold Wolfendale, the 14th Astronomer Royal.

Larn died after a short illness on 14 January 2026, at the age of 94.

== Honours ==
Besides receiving awards from diving and maritime history associations, Larn was made a Cornish Bard by the Gorsedd of Cornwall at Redruth in 2006, taking the Bardic name 'Gonyas an Mor' Servant of the Sea. He started a company Shipwrecks.UK.Ltd, and has a web site www.shipwreckphotographs.com, still being developed. In the Birthday Honours 2009 he was made an Officer of the Order of the British Empire (OBE) for "services to nautical archaeology and marine heritage". He was awarded the prestigious USA's 'Knight of Mark Twain' (1970). Larn, one of the original founders, has been the President and News Letter Editor of IMASS (International Marine Archaeological & Shipwreck Society) since 2010, an organisation which holds the prestige Shipwreck Conference annually at Plymouth University, now in its 35th year.

== Publications ==
Note: this list is not complete

- Admiral Shovell's Treasure and Shipwreck in the Isles of Scilly. Peter McBride & Richard Larn. Shipwreck & Marine, 1999
- Charlestown – the History of a Cornish Seaport. Villiers Publications, 1994
- Cornish Shipwrecks – the Isles of Scilly. David & Charles, 1971 & 1979 (2nd ed.)
- Cornish Shipwrecks – the South Coast. Richard Larn & Clive Carter. David & Charles, 1969 & 1971 Pan paperback editions, 1973 & 1976
- Devon Shipwrecks. David & Charles, 1974 & 1977. Pan paper-back editions, 1974 & 1977
- Goodwin Sands Shipwrecks. David & Charles, 1977 & 1979
- Ships, Shipwrecks and Maritime incidents in the Isles of Scilly. Museum Pub. No. 3 (for the Isles of Scilly Museum Council), 1999
- Shipwrecks at Land's End Richard Larn & Edwin Mills Clark. Doble & Brendon, 1970
- Shipwrecks of Devon. Countryside Books, 1996 (2nd ed.)
- Shipwrecks of Great Britain & Ireland. David & Charles, 1981
- Shipwrecks of the Goodwin Sands. Beresford Books, 1995 (2nd ed.)
- Shipwrecks of the Isles of Scilly. Shipwreck & Marine, 1999 (4th ed.)
- Shipwrecks of the Isles of Scilly. Thomas & Lochar, 1993 (3rd ed.)
- Sir Clowdisley Shovell's Disaster in the Isles of Scilly Richard Larn & Peter McBride. Western Litho Plymouth, 1985
- The Cita – Scilly's own 'Whisky Galore' wreck. Shipwreck & Marine, 1997 & 1998 (2nd ed.)
- The Commercial Diving Manual. Richard Larn & Rex Whistler. David & Charles, 1984, 1989 & 1993 (3rd ed.)
- The Diver Guide to South Cornwall. Underwater Publications, 1983, 1987 & 1996
- The Diver Guide to the Isles of Scilly & North Cornwall. Underwater Publications, 2002
- The Wrecks of Scilly, Shipwreck & Marine, 2010
- Shipwreck Index of the British Isles – Lloyd's Register of Shipping
  - Volume 1 'The West Country', 1995 ISBN 0-900528-88-5
  - Volume 2 'The South Coast', 1996 ISBN 0-900528-99-0
  - Volume 3 'The East Coast', 1997 ISBN 1-900839-10-5
  - Volume 4 'Scotland', 1998 ISBN 1-900839-01-6
  - Volume 5 'Wales & the West Coast', 2000 ISBN 1-900839-61-X
  - Volume 6 'Shipwreck Index of Ireland', 2002 ISBN 1-900839-97-0
- Tor Mark Press Series:
  - Shipwrecks around Land's End, 1989
  - Shipwrecks – St. Ives to Bude, 1990
  - Shipwrecks Around Mount's Bay, 1991
  - Shipwrecks Around the Lizard, 1992
  - Shipwrecks – Falmouth to Looe, 1993
  - Shipwrecks of North Devon, 1999
  - Shipwrecks of South Devon, 2000
  - Charlestown – a Visitors Guide, 1994
- Shipwreck & Marine Publishing
  - Poor England has lost so Many Men, 2007
  - Cornwall's Shipwrecks – the North Coast, 2009
  - Cornwall's Shipwrecks – the South Coast, 2009
  - Henry Trengrouse – a biography, 2006
  - Wreck & Rescue round the Cornish Coast, 2006
  - Augustus John Smith – a short biography, 2013
  - Built on Scilly – a history of ship building on the islands, 2013
  - The Wrecks of Scilly - 1971, 1979, 1985, 1992, 2010
  - The Isles of Scilly in the Great War 1914-1918
  - Sea of Storms - Shipwrecks of Cornwall and the Isles of Scilly ISBN 9780995502864 Mabecronbooks.co.uk/seaofstorms.html

== See also ==
- List of shipwrecks of the Isles of Scilly
