= HMS M4 (1919) =

Submarine of the Royal Navy

History

United Kingdom
- Name: HMS M4
- Builder: Armstrong Whitworth
- Laid down: 1917
- Launched: 2 July 1919
- Fate: Sold as an incomplete hulk, 30 November 1921

General characteristics (as designed)
- Class & type: M-class submarine
- Displacement: 1,594 long tons (1,620 t) surfaced; 1,946 long tons (1,977 t) submerged
- Length: 305 ft 9 in (93.19 m)
- Beam: 24 ft 8 in (7.52 m)
- Propulsion: 2 × 12-cylinder Vickers 1,200 hp (890 kW) diesel engines; 4 × 800 hp (600 kW) electric motors; 2 × 3-blade 5 ft 10 in (1.78 m) diameter propellers
- Speed: 15 knots (28 km/h) surfaced; 8–9 kn (15–17 km/h) submerged
- Range: Surfaced: 2,000 nmi (3,700 km) at 15 kn (28 km/h); 4,500 nmi (8,300 km) at 10 kn (19 km/h); Submerged: 9 nmi (17 km) at 17 kn (31 km/h); 80 nmi (150 km) at 2 kn (3.7 km/h)
- Test depth: 200 ft (61 m)
- Complement: 62
- Armament: 1 × 12-inch (305mm)/40 cal Mark IX gun with 50 rounds; 1 × 3 in (76 mm) Mk II HA anti-aircraft gun; 4 × 21 inch (533 mm) bow torpedo tubes with 4 reload torpedoes

HMS M4 was an M-class submarine of the Royal Navy built by Armstrong Whitworth, Newcastle Upon Tyne, and laid down in 1917. M4 was cancelled and sold as an incomplete hulk on 30 November 1921.
