= Banking lobby =

Financial organizations attempting to influence government

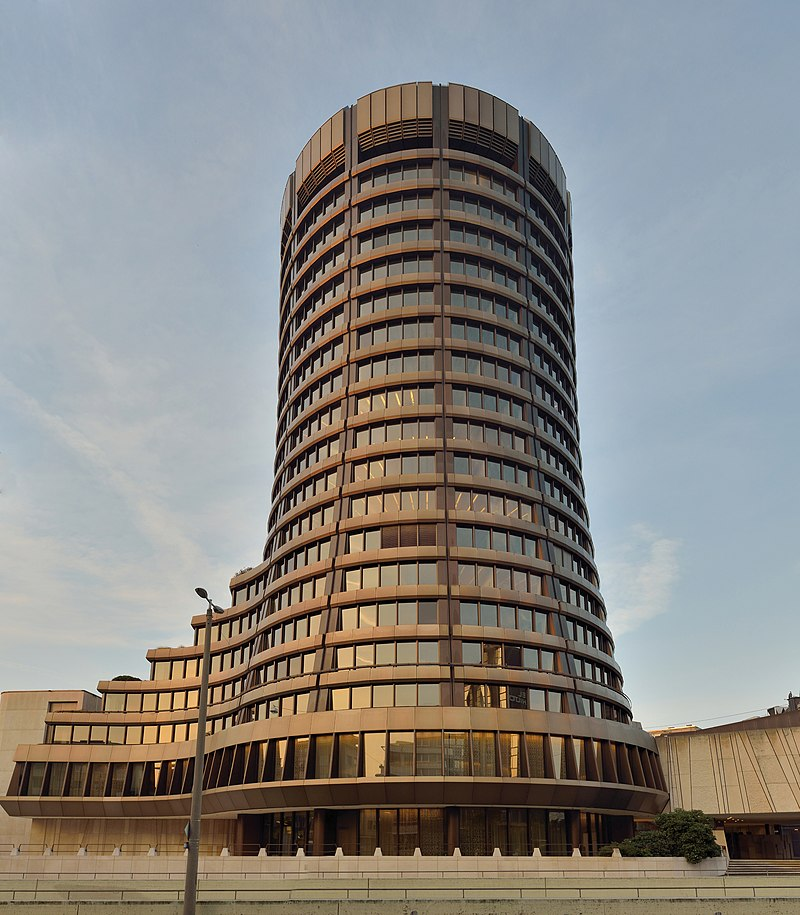
BCBS headquarters in Basel, Switzerland

The banking lobby refers to the representatives from various firms and organizations seeking favorable terms from governments for big banks and other financial service companies through lobbying and advocacy groups.

The banking lobby generally opposes stricter government regulation of financial markets while tending to stress the importance of banks in the economy. Some are concerned, however, that they may seek terms that do not necessarily increase performance of the economy as a whole, but only benefit the large banks. Excessive bank lobbying has been linked to weakened banking regulations, something that many believe contributed to the 2008 financial crisis. This led to a wave of banking reform, including, but not limited to, banking lobbies.

On an international level, banks lobby the Basel Committee on Banking Supervision (BCBS), the foremost global authority in establishing standards for the oversight of banks and a platform for collaboration on supervisory issues related to banking. The wealthier, internationally active banks and/or banks with more strict banking regulations in their home country tend to lobby the BCBS the most.

== United States ==
In the US, the Financial Services Roundtable, according to Investopedia, is the most noted organization involved in bank lobbying with members from the 100 largest banks and financial firms. The groups mission is to "protect and promote the economic vitality and integrity of its members and the United States financial system." The 2012 appointed CEO of the Financial Services Roundtable, Tim Pawlenty, is a well-connected politician who was a candidate in the 2012 United States presidential election. In the US the finance, real estate, and insurance industries reportedly spent a collective $6.8 Billion from 1998 through 2011, far more than any other lobbying sector. Since the banking industry holds large cash reserves, they have available funds to provide their lobbying representatives to influence policymakers in Washington. Some are concerned that this may lead to new policy being heavily favored in the banks' favor.

== Asia ==
After the 2008 financial crisis, European banks and financial organizations began to expand to Asia. This was part of a wave of western trading bodies shifting into foreign markets as a response to efforts for international regulation standards (also known as Basel III). This expansion also meant an increase of western lobbying practices in the Asian region, as many sought to influence the region's post-crisis reforms. They faced issues different from Western predicaments including: subpar corporate administration, unchecked insider trading, and having to implement G20 reforms (which meant overhauling derivatives markets and shutting down shadow banking). All of these transitions were happening simultaneously across many markets within the region, and many countries were struggling to implement reforms, with compliance costs far exceeding comparable European markets. The apparent lack of direction made Asia the new target for western lobbyists, as they began to attempt to influence policy in the east.

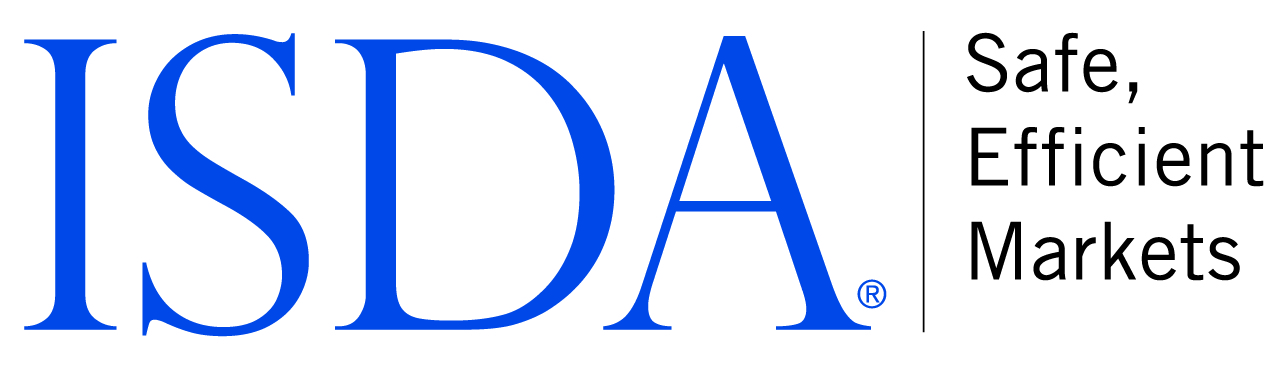
ISDA Logo

To meet this goal, they had to change their western persuasion tactics and adapt to existing Asian political traditions such as: writing text communications with a more appreciative tone, utilizing the national interests of the regulators, and avoiding publicizing the problems with leaks to the international media. For example, Asia Securities Industry & Financial Markets Association (ASIFMA) scheduled private, formal meetings with regulators and government officials in their government offices. During the post-crisis reform time period, financial lobbyists spent a lot of time educating officials on technical notions such as bond market development, as an effort to make themselves a useful resource for government regulators who may not have experience. ASIFMA was able to influence emerging markets such as Hong Kong about equity market trading controls, while the International Swaps and Derivatives Association (ISDA) led the way on the execution of cross-border derivatives trading regulations in India. ISDA officials met with Indian government officials from the Reserve Bank of India to persuade them to cooperate with the EU's demands.

=== China ===
The western tradition of lobbying has not been a historical aspect of Chinese government policymaking; in China, the party-state makes businesses serve its objectives and goals (sometimes even at a loss of corporate profits) versus the other way around. When financial institutions from the United States attempted to implement traditional lobbying techniques, government officials were reluctant to work with them.

=== Japan ===
Bank lobbying has a long history in Japan, reaching all the way back to the 1960s. During this period, Japan needed to make a decision about their central bank. A government committee held meetings where government officials and members of the Japanese Business Federation (Keidanren), one of the major financial and business interest groups in Japan, met and discussed whether the Bank of Japan should have the independence to control interest rates, how to open market operations, and the policies for reserve requirements. Despite the collaboration between the two more liberal parties, a high-growth economic approach was adopted, as leaders from the Japanese Ministry of Finance backed this conservative view. The Finance Minister of the time, Sato Eisaku, was one of the three conservative party leaders, and was thus far more dependent of business contributions, so he backed the high-growth inflationary policy.

In 2021, the Japanese Business Federation extended their efforts beyond Japan's borders to facilitate dialogues with both federal and state governments in the United States. Their goals were to influence American politicians to implement more policies with carbon-neutral goals.

== Europe ==
=== European Union ===
In the EU, the financial industry spends over €120 million a year on lobbying in Brussels, home to important EU departments like the European Commission and the European Economic and Social Committee, while employing over 1,700 lobbyists. A 2014 report found that 75% of sitting European Commission expert groups to advise legislation have direct links to the financial industry.

=== United Kingdom ===
After voters opted to leave the European Union in a 2016 referendum, an act that is often referred to as "Brexit," London bankers were worried how this would affect their businesses, so they grouped together into a lobby, led by Shriti Vadera, the chairwoman of the UK branch of Spain's Banco Santander and a former Business Minister. This lobby intended to influence Parliament to ensure that they could keep selling financial services across Europe, and as the UK's biggest exporter and accounting for 10% of tax revenues and thus a crucial element of the UK economy, they succeeded.

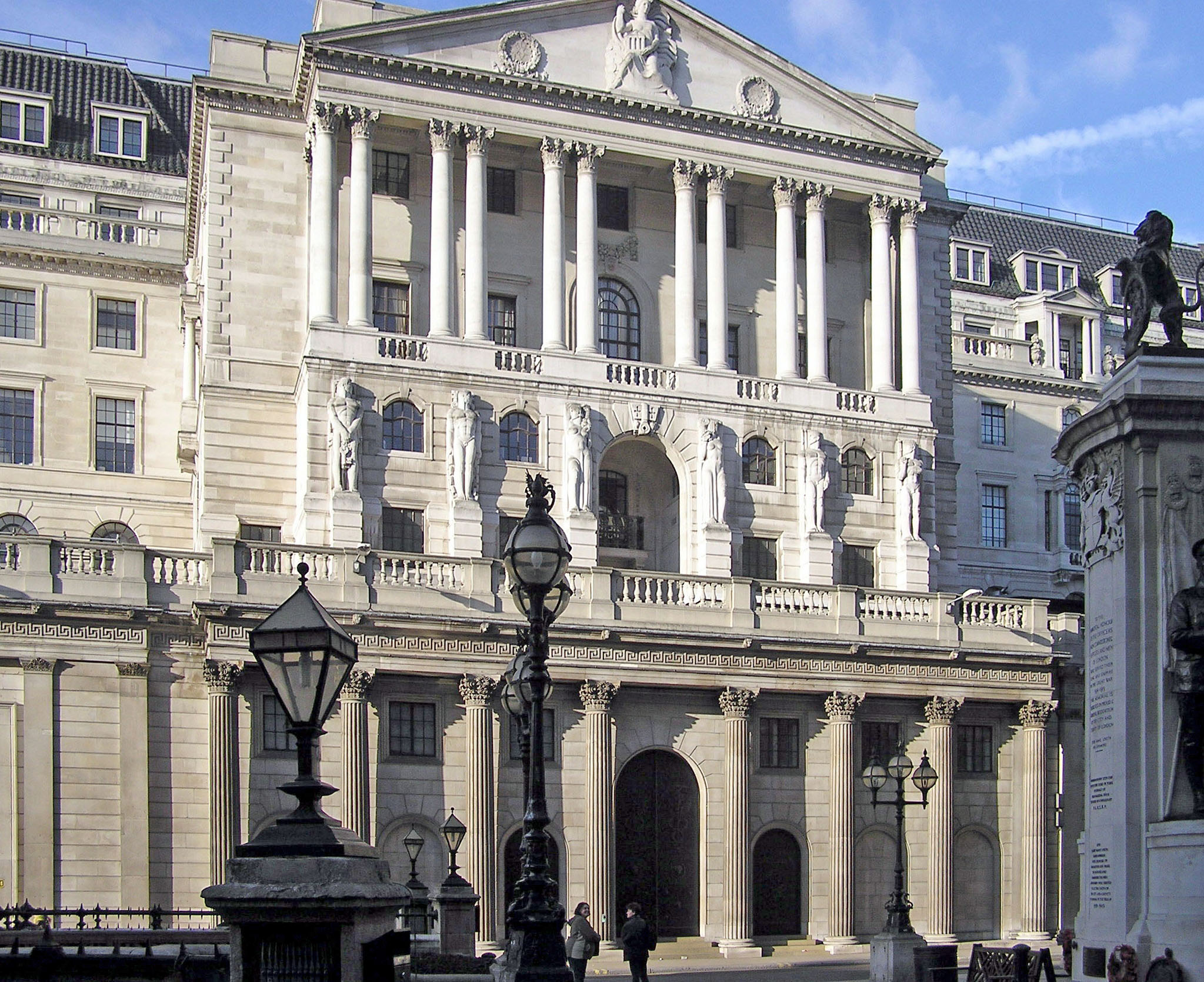
The Bank of England in London

Their power continued to be demonstrated years later in 2022, when the Edinburgh Reforms, a package of over 30 regulatory reforms, were set forth by the Chancellor of the Exchequer, Jeremy Hunt. These reforms have been described as a huge success for business and financial lobbying groups, with representatives from the Confederation of British Industry, one of the UK's largest business lobbying groups defending the reforms and arguing that they will allow for a "dynamic, competitive, and future-focused financial sector." and the CEO of Finance Innovation Labs, Jesse Griffiths stating that "the government just said yes to all of [our financial reports and policy recommendations], basically." These reforms center around revisions to a law that requires banks to keep their investment and consumer branches separate. It also includes substantial changes to the Financial Conduct Authority and Prudential Regulation Authority's operations, as they would now have to appraise how future supervisory and regulatory decisions impact growth and international competitiveness.

== Africa ==
=== South Africa ===
Post-apartheid South Africa relied heavily on the "Big Four" financial institutions of Absa, First National, Nedcor, and Standard Bank. At this point, South Africa's government took a "collaborative" approach. First, it increased its reliance on private sector communications and partnerships for policymaking and execution. Second, it escalated the sociopolitical expectations for businesses to partake in the creation/implementation of policy with an improved level of corporate social responsibility.

In 1998, the Big Four lobbied the Reserve Bank in a private meeting between top officials from both parties. The lobby demanded that interest rates be lowered, so the central bank agreed and reduced one-day repurchase and lending rates by half a percentage point (17.5% from 18% and 32.5% from 33%, respectively); they also gave commercial banks guaranteed "overnight funds" directly from the Reserve Bank if/when the money from the daily repurchase auctions were all gone. During this same time period, financial lobbyists influenced the government from public housing discourse away from public sector implementation into questioning whether the government should even be providing this, and if so, how who is in control, and who receives it. South African financial lobbyists worked in tandem with the World Bank to focus on user charges rather than participation, which limited any implementation of health, education, and any other welfare services, if they were even instituted at all.

== Latin America/Caribbean ==
Businesses and financial lobbying is widely perceived as a large part of Latin American countries' governance, as a study found that on average almost 75% of citizens believe that only a few powerful groups govern their countries for a profit. Due to a lack of enforcement and state capacity, lobbyists control a lot of policymaking in many Latin American countries, which is associated with corruption and state capture. They can influence governments with the swift production of information communications (such as policy proposals, reports, etc.). In Guatemala and Honduras, the Coordination Committee of Agriculture, Commerce, Industry, and Financial Associations (CACIF) and the Honduran Council of Private Business (COHEP) collaborate with multinational companies within the region to lobby their respective governments.

== Australia ==
The Business Council of Australia, which has board members from some of the biggest Australian banks, and the Australian Industrial Group created submission to the government review of an industrial emission reduction policy in favor of a border adjustment tax for carbon emissions (also known as a carbon tariff). As an AI Group representative put it: "trade-related climate measures are becoming tangible internationally and relevant to Australia... [A border adjustment tax would] level the international playing field for Australian producers of products with a risk of carbon leakage." The view of these lobbyists is that enacting carbon tariffs will penalize companies seeking to evade carbon emission reductions, thus, preserving domestic heavy industry competition.

== See also ==
- Fossil fuels lobby
