= Scillonian (magazine) =

Isles of Scilly magazine

Scillonian is a quarterly magazine of the Isles of Scilly, first published in 1925.

It has reported on historical maritime events such as the wreck of the SS Delaware in 1871, the grounding of the SS Minnehaha in 1910, and the grounding of the passenger ferry Scillonian in 1951.
