= Residential Tribunal of New South Wales =

The Residential Tribunal of New South Wales was a tribunal which had jurisdiction to deal with tenancy disputes in New South Wales. It replaced the Residential Tenancies Tribunal of New South Wales (the former tribunal) on 1 March 1999.

The tribunal was abolished and the Consumer, Trader and Tenancy Tribunal of New South Wales subsequently replaced the tribunal on 25 February 2002.

== History ==
The former Tribunal was established under the Residential Tenancies Act 1987 (NSW) as the primary dispute resolution body for residential tenancies in New South Wales. Following a review of other tribunals under the portfolio of the Department of Fair Trading of New South Wales (such as the Commercial Tribunal, Consumer Claims Tribunal, Building Disputes Tribunal and the Motor Vehicle Repair Disputes Committee), as well as an internal review by the former tribunal, the former tribunal was abolished and replaced with this tribunal.

The review concluded that there was a deficiency in the law as the former tribunal could not operate in specialist divisions. The new tribunal was also to have the flexibility to conduct hearings before a single member or to constitute multimember panels depending on the degree of complexity or the nature of the matter in dispute. The tribunal was also to have flexible procedures and would have the discretion to adapt its procedures to fit the dispute before it.

== Structure and Jurisdiction ==
The tribunal was established under the Residential Tribunal Act 1998 (NSW). It had jurisdiction under the Community Land Management Act 1989 (NSW), Residential Parks Act 1998 (NSW), Residential Tenancies Act 1987 (NSW), Retirement Villages Act 1999 (NSW) and the Strata Schemes Management Act 1996 (NSW).

The tribunal was to conduct proceedings with as little formality and technicality and with as much expedition as the requirements of the matter in question permitted. The tribunal was not bound by the rules of evidence. Alternative dispute resolution was to be an important focus in the tribunal's operations.

Parties could appear in person and legal representation was not permitted unless the tribunal permitted to do so. However, a landlord could have a real estate agent attend on their behalf.

There was a right of appeal on a question of law to the Supreme Court of New South Wales.

== Membership ==
The Tribunal consisted of a chairperson, a deputy chairperson or deputy chairpersons, senior members, and other members as required. The chairperson could also appoint assessors as necessary.

== Chairpersons ==
- Not known
