= Affiliated Residential Park Residents Association =

Non-profit association

The Affiliated Residential Park Residents Association Incorporated (ARPRA) is an incorporated non-profit association with a registered office in Port Macquarie, New South Wales, Australia.

Established in 1986 to represent residents of residential parks in Port Stephens and the city of Lake Macquarie, ARPRA has since expanded and today represents affiliates from the Great Lakes, Mid North Coast, Central Coast, South Coast, Tweed Heads, Illawarra, Hunter, Coffs Harbour, Nambucca Valley, Yamba, Iluka, Kingscliff, Grafton, Northern Beaches and Greater Western Sydney regions.

ARPRA has a member-elected state body composed of a State President, two Vice Presidents, a Treasurer, a Secretary and five Executive Committee members and a Membership Officer.

== Mission ==
On its website, ARPRA writes that it makes sure that each member's "voice is heard" and as such, it represents the interests and concerns of people who are using caravan or residential parks in New South Wales as their principal place of permanent residence.

With the assistance of volunteers, the Association lobbies the Government on legislation regarding the Residential Parks Act in order to ensure that the residents' rights are recognized and considered by residential park owners. The Association also represents members before the Consumer, Trader and Tenancy Tribunal of New South Wales (CTTT) in disputes between residents and park operators. While disputes usually revolve around rent increases, ARPRA volunteers frequently represent members on matters such as park rules, termination of agreements, and the right to live in "quiet enjoyment and reasonable peace, comfort or privacy". It also provides telephone, web and face-to-face advocacy and participates in a range of consultative areas with government and non-government offices.

== Advocating and lobbying ==
In 1995, following the lobbying done by ARPRA and other interested tenant organizations, the Government created new legislation to provide residential park residents with improved protection. The Residential Parks Act of 1996 became the operating tool for the conduct of residents and park owners alike. In 1998, following further lobbying for the legislative review and revision of the 1996 Act, the Residential Parks Act of 1998 became law.

In 1999, ARPRA’s state body and affiliates became involved in a campaign against the practice of charging Goods and Services Tax on site fees or rent. Park owners eventually agreed to stop applying GST to site fees.

In early 2011, ARPRA began lobbying for the amendment of the 1998 Act, particularly that caravan or residential parks should be required to register. In September 2011, Fair Trading Minister Anthony Roberts announced in a media release that the NSW Parliament had passed amendments to the Residential Parks Act of 1998, which would result in the creation of a residential park registry. ARPRA, which started the "registry campaign", was named in both the NSW Senate and Parliament because of its efforts.

== Media ==
ARPRA has used the media in its lobbying efforts to raise awareness of issues that affect older tenants. In September 2009, ARPRA started a "For Sale" campaign, wherein ARPRA members who lived in Crystal Waters Estate placed "For Sale" signs on their properties to protest what they claimed to be an unreasonable rent increase. The story was picked up by local media.

The mainstream media has since given statewide coverage to important issues relating to residential parks, and ARPRA is regularly consulted by the media to make comment on residential park matters.
