= List of shipwrecks in October 1914 =

The list of shipwrecks in October 1914 includes ships sunk, foundered, grounded, or otherwise lost during October 1914.

== 1 October ==
List of shipwrecks: 1 October 1914
Ship	State	Description
Westland	Norway	The cargo ship sank in the Kalmar Strait off Öland, Sweden, with the loss of a crew member.

== 2 October ==
List of shipwrecks: 2 October 1914
Ship	State	Description
Reinfeld	Germany	World War I: The Admiralty-requisitioned cargo ship was scuttled at Scapa Flow as a blockship. Later scrapped.

== 3 October ==
List of shipwrecks: 3 October 1914
Ship	State	Description
Dawdon	United Kingdom	World War I: The cargo ship (1,310 GRT) struck a mine and sank in the North Sea 10 nautical miles (19 km) north west by west of the Wandelaar Lightship (Belgium) with the loss of ten of her crew.
Elton	United Kingdom	World War I: The Admiralty-requisitioned cargo ship (2,461 GRT, 1888) was sunk in Skerry Sound, Scapa Flow as a blockship. Later extensively salvaged, except for her engines.
Kate B. Ogden	United States	The schooner was abandoned in the Atlantic Ocean off the coast of Newfoundland. Her crew were rescued by Margelisborg (Denmark).

== 4 October ==
List of shipwrecks: 4 October 1914
Ship	State	Description
Munin	Norway	The cargo ship caught fire at Lisbon, Portugal and was beached.

== 5 October ==
List of shipwrecks: 5 October 1914
Ship	State	Description
Ardmount	United Kingdom	World War I: The cargo ship (3,510 GRT) struck a mine and sank in the North Sea 3 nautical miles (5.6 km) east by south of the Wandelaar Lightship (Belgium).
HMT Drumoak	Royal Navy	World War I: The naval trawler (208 GRT, 1902) struck a mine and sank in the North Sea off the West Hinder Lightship (Netherlands).
HMT Princess Beatrice	Royal Navy	World War I: The naval trawler (214 GRT, 1912) struck a mine an sank in the North Sea off the West Hinder Lightship (Netherlands).

== 6 October ==
List of shipwrecks: 6 October 1914
Ship	State	Description
Niceto de Larrinaga	United Kingdom	World War I: The cargo ship (5,018 GRT, 1912) was scuttled in the Atlantic Ocean 100 nautical miles (190 km) south by west of the St Paul Rocks, Brazil by SMS Karlsruhe (Imperial German Navy).
SMS S13	Imperial German Navy	The S13-class destroyer suffered an onboard explosion (own torpedo) and sank in the North Sea.
SMS T116	Imperial German Navy	World War I: The S90-class torpedo boat was torpedoed and sunk in the North Sea by HMS E9 (Royal Navy) with the loss of eleven of her crew.

== 7 October ==
List of shipwrecks: 7 October 1914
Ship	State	Description
Doyle	United Kingdom	World War I: The cargo ship was sunk as a blockship in Burra Sound, Scapa Flow, Orkney Islands.
La Correntina	United Kingdom	World War I: The cargo ship (8,529 GRT) was scuttled in the Atlantic Ocean 320 nautical miles (590 km) east by north of Montevideo, Uruguay by SMS Kronprinz Wilhelm (Imperial German Navy).
Lynrowan	United Kingdom	World War I: The cargo ship (3,384 GRT, 1907) was scuttled in the Atlantic Ocean 90 nautical miles (170 km) south south west of the St Paul Rocks, Brazil by SMS Karlsruhe (Imperial German Navy).

== 8 October ==
List of shipwrecks: 8 October 1914
Ship	State	Description
Cervantes	United Kingdom	World War I: The cargo ship (4,635 GRT, 1907) was scuttled in the Atlantic Ocean 100 nautical miles (190 km) south by west of the St Paul Rocks, Brazil 0°40′S 29°40′W by SMS Karlsruhe (Imperial German Navy).

== 9 October ==
List of shipwrecks: 9 October 1914
Ship	State	Description
Pruth	United Kingdom	World War I: The cargo ship (4,408 GRT, 1905) was scuttled in the Atlantic Ocean 90 nautical miles (170 km) south by west of the St Paul Rocks, Brazil by SMS Karlsruhe (Imperial German Navy).

== 10 October ==
List of shipwrecks: 10 October 1914
Ship	State	Description
Akula	Imperial Russian Navy	The submarine ran aground in the Soeloesund. She was refloated with assistance from the gunboat Brave (Imperial Russian Navy).
Alligator	Imperial Russian Navy	The Kaiman-class submarine ran aground in the Soeloesund. She was refloated with assistance from the cruisers Admiral Makarov and Gromoboi (both Imperial Russian Navy).
Alma A. E. Holmes	United States	The 202-foot (62 m), 1,208-gross register ton four-masted schooner collided with the steamer Belfast (United Kingdom) in Massachusetts Bay and sank in 160 feet (49 m) of water off Bakers Island off Marblehead, Massachusetts, at 42°26′06″N 70°44′54″W. Belfast rescued her crew.

== 11 October ==
List of shipwrecks: 11 October 1914
Ship	State	Description
Condor	United Kingdom	World War I: The cargo ship (3,053 GRT, 1893) was scuttled in the Atlantic Ocean 215 nautical miles (398 km) north north east of Cabo São Roque, Brazil by SMS Karlsruhe (Imperial German Navy).
Pallada	Imperial Russian Navy	World War I: The Bayan-class cruiser was torpedoed and sunk in the Gulf of Finland off Osmussaar, Estonia (59°37′N 23°02′E) by U-26 (Imperial German Navy) with the loss of all 597 crew.

== 12 October ==
List of shipwrecks: 12 October 1914
Ship	State	Description
Gobernador Bories	Chile	World War I: The Admiralty-requisitioned cargo ship (2,332 GRT, 1882) was scuttled in Burra Sound, Scapa Flow as a block ship.
Markomannia	Imperial German Navy	World War I: The cargo ship was captured and scuttled off Simaur Island, Sumatra by HMS Yarmouth (Royal Navy).

== 14 October ==
List of shipwrecks: 14 October 1914
Ship	State	Description
Corundum	United Kingdom	The steamship collided with Kyleness (United Kingdom) in the Bristol Channel off the Helwick Lightship (United Kingdom) and foundered. Her crew were rescued by Kyleness.

== 15 October ==
List of shipwrecks: 15 October 1914
Ship	State	Description
Gold Hunter	United States	The 5-net register ton motor vessel was wrecked at Point Couverdon (58°11′25″N 135°03′10″W) in Southeast Alaska. Her crew of two survived.
HMS Hawke	Royal Navy	World War I: The Edgar-class cruiser was torpedoed and sunk in the North Sea by SM U-9 (Imperial German Navy) with the loss of 526 of her 594 crew. A wreck, probably her, was discovered on 12 August 2024 in 360 feet (110 m) of water.

== 16 October ==
List of shipwrecks: 16 October 1914
Ship	State	Description
Benmohr	United Kingdom	World War I: The cargo ship (4,806 GRT) was scuttled in the Indian Ocean 65 nautical miles (120 km) north west of Minicoy, India by SMS Emden (Imperial German Navy).
Clan Grant	United Kingdom	World War I: The cargo ship (3,948 GRT, 1902) was shelled and sunk in the Indian Ocean 150 nautical miles (280 km) west of Minicoy by SMS Emden (Imperial German Navy).
Ponrabbel	United Kingdom	World War I: The dredger (473 GRT) was shelled and sunk in the Indian Ocean 20 nautical miles (37 km) north west of Minicoy by SMS Emden (Imperial German Navy).

== 17 October ==
List of shipwrecks: 17 October 1914
Ship	State	Description
HMS Holland 4	Royal Navy	The decommissioned submarine, which had been salvaged after foundering in September 1912, was sunk as a gunnery target.
SMS S90	Imperial German Navy	World War I: The S90-class torpedo boat was scuttled at Qingdao, China.
SMS S115	Imperial German Navy	World War I: Battle off Texel: The torpedo boat was shelled and sunk in the North Sea off Texel, North Holland, Netherlands by HMS Lance, HMS Legion, HMS Lennox, HMS Loyal, and HMS Undaunted (all Royal Navy).
SMS S117	Imperial German Navy	World War I: Battle off Texel: The torpedo boat was shelled and sunk in the North Sea off Texel by HMS Lance, HMS Legion (1914), HMS Lennox, HMS Loyal, and HMS Undaunted (all Royal Navy).
SMS S118	Imperial German Navy	World War I: Battle off Texel: The torpedo boat was shelled and sunk in the North Sea off Texel by HMS Lance, HMS Legion, HMS Lennox, HMS Loyal, and HMS Undaunted (all Royal Navy).
SMS S119	Imperial German Navy	World War I: Battle off Texel: The torpedo boat was shelled and sunk in the North Sea off Texel by HMS Lance, HMS Legion, HMS Lennox, HMS Loyal, and HMS Undaunted (all Royal Navy).
Takachiho	Imperial Japanese Navy	World War I: Siege of Qingdao: The Naniwa-class cruiser was torpedoed and sunk 10 nautical miles (19 km) southeast of Jiaozhou Bay, China (35°55′N 120°24′E), by SMS S90 (Imperial German Navy) with the loss of 271 of her 274 crew.

== 18 October ==
List of shipwrecks: 18 October 1914
Ship	State	Description
HMS E3	Royal Navy	World War I: The E-class submarine was torpedoed and sunk in the North Sea off Borkum, Denmark by SM U-27 (Imperial German Navy) with the loss of all 28 crew.
Glanton	United Kingdom	World War I: The cargo ship (3,021 GRT, 1894) was scuttled in the Atlantic Ocean 195 nautical miles (361 km) south west of the St Paul Rocks, Brazil (approximately 1°S 4°W) by SMS Karlsruhe (Imperial German Navy). Her crew were taken as prisoners of war.
Troilus	United Kingdom	World War I: The cargo ship (7,562 GRT) was shelled and sunk in the Indian Ocean 170 nautical miles (310 km) east of Minicoy, India by SMS Emden (Imperial German Navy).

== 19 October ==
List of shipwrecks: 19 October 1914
Ship	State	Description
Chilkana	United Kingdom	World War I: The cargo ship (3,244 GRT) was shelled and sunk in the Indian Ocean 110 nautical miles (200 km) east north east of Minicoy, India by SMS Emden (Imperial German Navy).

== 20 October ==
List of shipwrecks: 20 October 1914
Ship	State	Description
Glitra	United Kingdom	World War I: The cargo ship (866 GRT, 1881) was stopped in the North Sea 14 nautical miles (26 km) west south west of Skudeneshavn, Rogaland, Norway by SM U-17 (Imperial German Navy). She was searched under prize rules and her crew were allowed to take to the lifeboats before she was scuttled at 59°01′N 4°50′E.

== 21 October ==
List of shipwrecks: 21 October 1914
Ship	State	Description
Cormorant	United Kingdom	World War I: The cargo ship (1,595 GRT) struck a mine and sank in the Thames Estuary 4 nautical miles (7.4 km) east of the West Gabbard Lightship (United Kingdom).
Hunter	United States	The six-ton motor vessel was forced onto the beach by a tidal eddy and wrecked at Salt Chuck (55°42′N 131°39′W) in Traitors Cove (55.7192°N 131.6417°W) in Southeast Alaska. The only person aboard survived.
Svithiod	Sweden	The passenger ship collided with Mimosa (United Kingdom) at Stockholm and sank with the loss of two lives.

== 22 October ==
List of shipwrecks: 22 October 1914
Ship	State	Description
Alice	Sweden	World War I: The steamer, en route from London to Gothenburg, sank in the North Sea after an explosion at approximately (52°32′N 02°03′E), with the loss of two crew members. The crew had prior to the explosion sighted a submarine but saw no trace of a torpedo, so it was presumed that the steamer struck a mine.
Ida	United Kingdom	The ketch foundered in the English Channel off the Yaverland Battery, Isle of Wight. Her crew were rescued by Magnet (United Kingdom).
Rochelle	United States	The cargo ship ran aground at the mouth of the Columbia River and was a total loss.

== 23 October ==
List of shipwrecks: 23 October 1914
Ship	State	Description
Hurstdale	United Kingdom	World War I: The refrigerated cargo liner (2,752 GRT, 1902) was scuttled in the Atlantic Ocean 205 nautical miles (380 km) south west of the St Paul Rocks, Brazil (approximately 1°S 4°W) by SMS Karlsruhe (Imperial German Navy). Her crew were taken as prisoners of war.

== 24 October ==
List of shipwrecks: 24 October 1914
Ship	State	Description
Harry A. Wheeler	United States	The barge sank at the dock of the East End Coal Company, Bridgeport, Connecticut.
New Jersey	United States	The 36-foot (11.0 m) motor cargo schooner disappeared with the loss of all five men on board in the Chukchi Sea off the Territory of Alaska somewhere between Sinuk and Point Hope. Wreckage from New Jersey later washed ashore on Cape Thompson south of Point Hope.
Scotty	United States	The launch ran ashore on Groton Long Point, Connecticut.

== 25 October ==
List of shipwrecks: 25 October 1914
Ship	State	Description
Warren	United States	The dredge sank at North Falmouth, Massachusetts.

== 26 October ==
List of shipwrecks: 26 October 1914
Ship	State	Description
Manchester Commerce	United Kingdom	World War I: The 5,363-ton steamer was sunk in the Atlantic Ocean 20 nautical miles (37 km) northeast of Malin Head, County Donegal, Ireland, U.K. with the loss of her Captain and thirteen of her 44 crew by a mine placed by the cruiser Berlin (Imperial German Navy). The trawler City of London (United Kingdom) rescued the survivors.
Vandyck	United Kingdom	World War I: The ocean liner (10,328 GRT, 1911) was sunk in the Atlantic Ocean 690 nautical miles (1,280 km) west by south of the St Paul Rocks, Brazil by SMS Karlsruhe (Imperial German Navy).

== 27 October ==
List of shipwrecks: 27 October 1914
Ship	State	Description
HMS Audacious	Royal Navy	HMS Audacious World War I: The King George V-class battleship struck a mine and sank in the Atlantic Ocean 25 nautical miles (46 km) off Tory Island, County Donegal. All 900 crew were rescued by HMS Liverpool (Royal Navy), Olympic (United Kingdom) and Thornhill (United Kingdom).
Örnen	Sweden	World War I: The steamer, en route from Gothenburg to Groningen, struck a mine off Nordeney and sank with the loss of six of her crew. Three survivors were brought to Nordeney by a fisherman, alerted by a German flying boat that witnessed the ship's foundering.

== 28 October ==
List of shipwrecks: 28 October 1914
Ship	State	Description
Maria Christiana	Netherlands	World War I: The lugger struck a mine and sank in the North Sea 40 nautical miles (74 km) north west of IJmuiden, North Holland with the loss of all ten crew.
Mary Stanley	United Kingdom	The 120-foot (37 m) 227-ton steam trawler was sunk in a collision with "Laura" (United Kingdom) in the Hebrides.
Mousquet	French Navy	World War I: Battle of Penang: The Arquebuse-class destroyer was shelled and sunk off the Straits Settlements by the light cruiser SMS Emden (Imperial German Navy), which rescued 33 survivors.
Zhemchug	Imperial Russian Navy	World War I: Battle of Penang: The Izumrud-class cruiser was torpedoed and sunk off the Straits Settlements by the light cruiser SMS Emden (Imperial German Navy) with the loss of 89 of her 354 crew.

== 29 October ==
List of shipwrecks: 29 October 1914
Ship	State	Description
Donetz	Imperial Russian Navy	World War I: Black Sea Raid: The gunboat was sunk in the harbor at Odesa by the destroyers Muavenet-i Milliye and Gayret-i Vataniye (both Ottoman Navy). She was refloated, repaired, and returned to service.
Irvington	United States	While towing coal barges, the 140-foot (43 m), 398-gross register ton Lehigh Valley Railroad tug struck Northeast Pond Ledge – a reef 5 nautical miles (9.3 km; 5.8 mi) south of Owls Head, Maine. a storm on 19 November pushed the wreck off the reef and sank off its north side, coming to rest in 50 feet (15 m) of water at the base of the reef at 44°00′50″N 069°02′10″W.
Kazbek	Russia	World War I: The cargo ship struck two mines and sank in the Black Sea off the Takil Lighthouse with some loss of life.
Kubanetz	Imperial Russian Navy	World War I: The gunboat was sunk at Odesa by Ottoman Navy gunboats.
Our Tom	United Kingdom	World War I: The trawler (40 GRT) struck a mine and sank in the North Sea 25 nautical miles (46 km) south east of the mouth of the River Tyne with the loss of two of her crew.
Rosella	United Kingdom	World War I: The trawler (243 GRT) struck a mine and sank in the North Sea 45 nautical miles (83 km) south east of Southwold, Suffolk with the loss of three of her crew.
SMS Tiger	Imperial German Navy	World War I: Siege of Qingdao: The Iltis-class gunboat was scuttled at Qingdao, China.
Yalta	Russia	World War I: The passenger ship struck a mine and sank in the Black Sea off the Takil Lighthouse.

== 30 October ==
List of shipwrecks: 30 October 1914
Ship	State	Description
HMHS Rohilla	United Kingdom	HMHS Rohilla ( Red Cross): The hospital ship (7,114 GRT, 1906) struck Whitby Rock, off Saltwick, Yorkshire and sank with the loss of 85 of the 229 people on board. Survivors were rescued by Bradford, Henry Vernon, John Fielden, Queensbury, Robert and Mary Ellis and William Riley of Birmingham and Leamington (all Royal National Lifeboat Institution).

== 31 October ==
List of shipwrecks: 31 October 1914
Ship	State	Description
HMS Hermes	Royal Navy	World War I: The Highflyer-class cruiser was torpedoed and sunk in the Strait of Dover (56°06′18″N 1°50′18″E) by SM U-27 (Imperial German Navy) with the loss of 22 of her 450 crew.
