= SMS S119 =

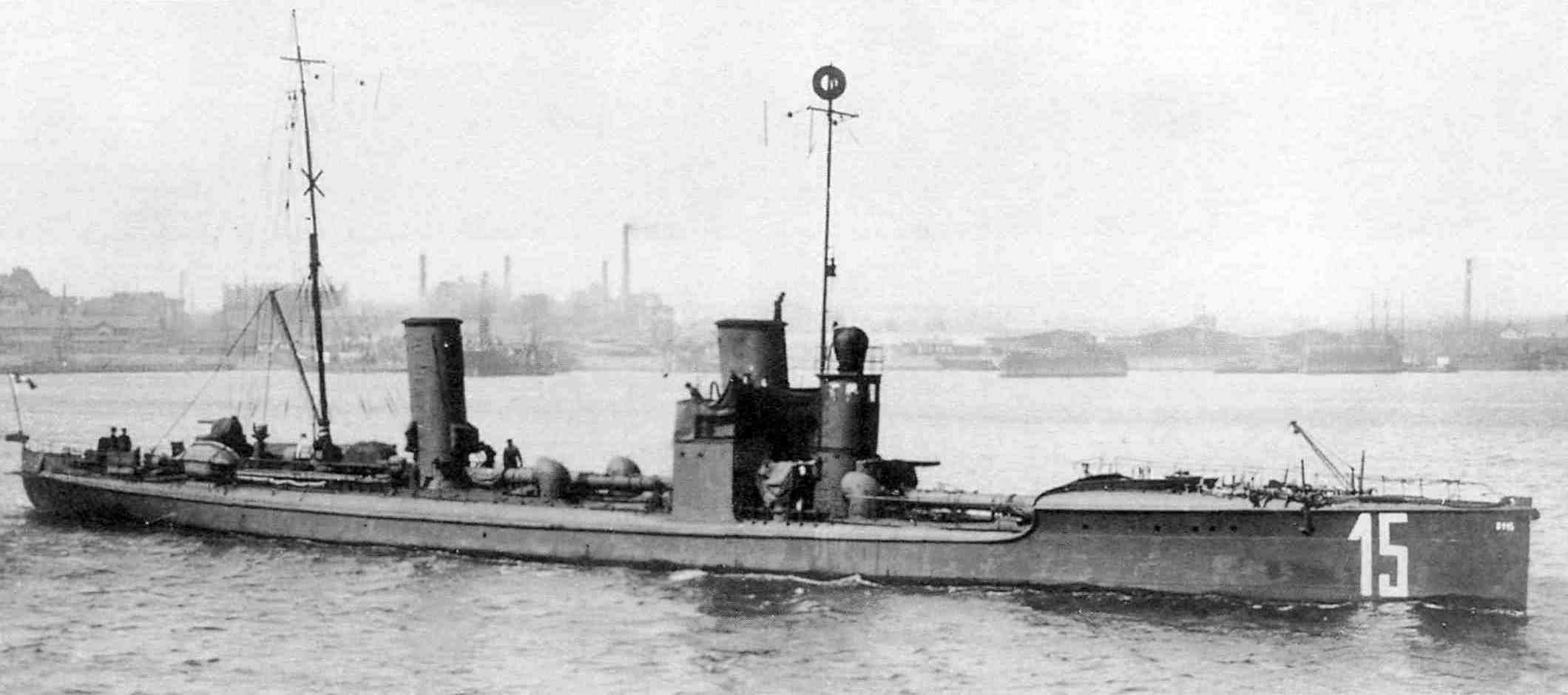
- SMS S115 a sister ship to S119

History

German Empire
- Name: SMS S119
- Builder: Schichau-Werke, Elbing
- Launched: 8 July 1903
- Commissioned: 6 September 1903
- Fate: Sunk in Battle off Texel, 17 October 1914

General characteristics
- Class & type: S90-class torpedo boat
- Displacement: 415 t (408 long tons)
- Length: 63.0 m (206 ft 8 in)
- Beam: 7.0 m (23 ft 0 in)
- Draft: 2.69 m (8 ft 10 in)
- Installed power: 5,900 PS (5,800 ihp; 4,300 kW)
- Propulsion: 3 × boilers; 2 × 3-cylinder triple expansion engines
- Speed: 27 kn (50 km/h; 31 mph)
- Range: 980 nmi (1,810 km; 1,130 mi) at 17 kn (31 km/h; 20 mph)
- Complement: 49 officers and sailors
- Armament: 3 × 5.0 cm (2.0 in) L/40 guns; 3 × 450 mm torpedo tubes

SMS S119 (Note: "SMS" stands for "Seiner Majestät Schiff" ('His Majesty's Ship')) (Note: The "S" in S119 denoted the shipbuilder who constructed her.) was a S90-class torpedo boat of the Imperial German Navy that served during the First World War. The ship was built by Schichau at Elbing in Prussia (now Elbląg in Poland), and was completed in September 1903. The ship was sunk during the Battle off Texel on 17 October 1914.

== Construction and design ==
The S90-class consisted of 48 torpedo-boats, built between 1898 and 1907 by Schichau and Germaniawerft for the Imperial German Navy. They were larger than previous German torpedo-boats, allowing them to work effectively with the High Seas Fleet in the North Sea, while also being large enough to act as flotilla leader when necessary, thus eliminating the need for separate larger division boats.

S119 was one of a group of six torpedo boats built by Schichau between 1902 and 1903. She was launched from Schichau's Elbing shipyard on 8 July 1903 and commissioned on 6 September 1903.

S119 was 63.2 metres (207 ft 4 in) long overall and 63.0 metres (206 ft 8 in) at the waterline, with a beam of 7.0 metres (23 ft 0 in) and a draft of 2.69 metres (8 ft 10 in). Displacement was 315 tonnes (310 long tons) normal and 415 tonnes (408 long tons) deep load. Three coal-fired Thornycroft three-drum water-tube boilers fed steam to 2 sets of 3-cylinder triple expansion steam engines rated at 5,900 PS (5,800 ihp; 4,300 kW), giving a design speed of 27 knots (50 km/h; 31 mph), with speeds of 28 knots (52 km/h; 32 mph) reached during sea trials. 102 tonnes (100 long tons) of coal was carried, giving a range of 980 nautical miles (1,810 km; 1,130 mi) at 17 knots (31 km/h; 20 mph).

While the S90-class were of similar size to contemporary foreign torpedo-boat destroyers, the German navy saw their role as primarily torpedo attack against opposing fleets, rather than defending their own fleet against attack, so the ships had a lighter gun armament than British destroyers, and a lower silhouette to avoid detection during night attacks. S119 had a gun armament of three 5 cm SK L/40 guns in single mounts, while torpedo armament consisted of three single 450 mm torpedo tubes (one in a well deck between the raised forecastle and the bridge, with the remaining two tubes aft of the bridge. Two reload torpedoes were carried. The ship had a complement of 49 officers and men.

== Service ==
In May 1904 S119 was the Division boat or leader of the 6th Torpedo-boat Division of the 1st Torpedo-boat Flotilla, while in 1907, she was division boat of the 8th Half-flotilla of the 2nd School Flotilla. In 1910, she was listed as leader of the 9th Half-Flotilla of the 5th Torpedoboat Flotilla, remaining there until 1912. In 1913 S119 was fitted with new boilers. In 1914, S119 was leader of the 7th Half-Flotilla of the 4th Torpedo-boat Flotilla.

S119 remained part of the 7th Half-Flotilla on the outbreak of the First World War in August 1914. In October 1914, in an attempt to take advantage of the Royal Navy's distraction by operations in the English Channel, the German Navy decided to lay a minefield off the mouth of the River Thames or in The Downs. Four torpedo-boats of the 7th Half-Flotilla, led by Korvettenkapitän Georg Thiele aboard S119, with the remaining ships S115, S117 and S118, set out from the Ems on 17 October 1914, with these elderly ships selected for this mission because they were unfit for other duties and considered disposable. Later that day, the four torpedo boats ran into a British patrol on the Broad Fourteens off Terschelling in the Netherlands. The British patrol, the light cruiser Undaunted and four destroyers Lance, Legion, Lennox and Loyal of the Harwich Force, engaged the four German torpedo boats in the Battle off Texel. The German ships were unable to escape (although originally capable of 28 knots (52 km/h; 32 mph), by 1914 they were only capable of 18 knots (33 km/h; 21 mph)) and were heavily outgunned, with all four German ships sunk with little damage being done to the British ships. S119 attempted a torpedo attack against Undaunted but was sunk by Loyal and Legion. The British rescued 34 officers and men from the four German ships, with two more picked up the next day by a neutral fishing vessel. 47 of S119's crew were lost, including Georg Thiele. On 30 November a British trawler fished up a lead-lined chest that had been jettisoned by S119 before she was sunk. The chest contained a codebook used by flag officers at sea. The destroyer Georg Thiele was named after S119's commanding officer in the 1930s.

== Bibliography ==
- "Action on October 17th, 1914, between the Undaunted, Legion, Loyal, Lance and Lennox and four German T. B. D's. of S. Class" (PDF). The Naval Review. V. London: The Naval Society. 1919. OCLC 9030883. Archived from the original (PDF) on 2014-09-05.
- Chesneau, Roger; Kolesnik, Eugene M., eds. (1979). Conway's All the World's Fighting Ships 1860–1905. London: Conway Maritime Press. ISBN 0-85177-133-5.
- Gardiner, Robert; Gray, Randal, eds. (1985). Conway's All The World's Fighting Ships 1906–1921. London: Conway Maritime Press. ISBN 0-85177-245-5.
- Gröner, Erich (1983). Die deutschen Kriegsschiffe 1815–1945: Band 2: Torpedoboote, Zerstörer, Schnelleboote, Minensuchboote, Minenräumboote. Koblenz, Germany: Bernard & Graefe Verlag. ISBN 3-7637-4801-6.
- Halpern, Paul G. (1994). A Naval History of World War I. London: UCL Press. ISBN 1-85728-498-4.
- Koop, Gerhard; Schmolke, Klaus-Peter (2014). German Destroyers of World War II. Barnsley, UK: Seaforth Publishing. ISBN 978-1-84832-193-9.
- Monograph No. 11: Heligoland Bight—The Action of August 28, 1914 (PDF). Naval Staff Monographs (Historical). Vol. III. The Naval Staff, Training and Staff Duties Division. 1921. pp. 110–166. OCLC 220734221.
- Monograph No. 24: Home Waters—Part II.: September and October 1914 (PDF). Naval Staff Monographs (Historical). Vol. XI. The Naval Staff, Training and Staff Duties Division. 1924.
- Scheer, Reinhard (1920). Germany's High Sea Fleet in the World War. London, New York, Toronto and Melbourne: Cassell. pp. 60–62. OCLC 2765294.
- Viscount Hythe (1912). The Naval Annual 1912. Portsmouth, UK: J. Griffin and Co.
- Jane, Fred T. (1970) [Originally published by Sampson Low, Marston & Co. Ltd. London: 1906]. Jane's Fighting Ships 1906–7. London: David & Charles (Publishers). ISBN 0-7153-4715-2.
