= Laforey-class destroyer (1913) =

Class of British Navy destroyers

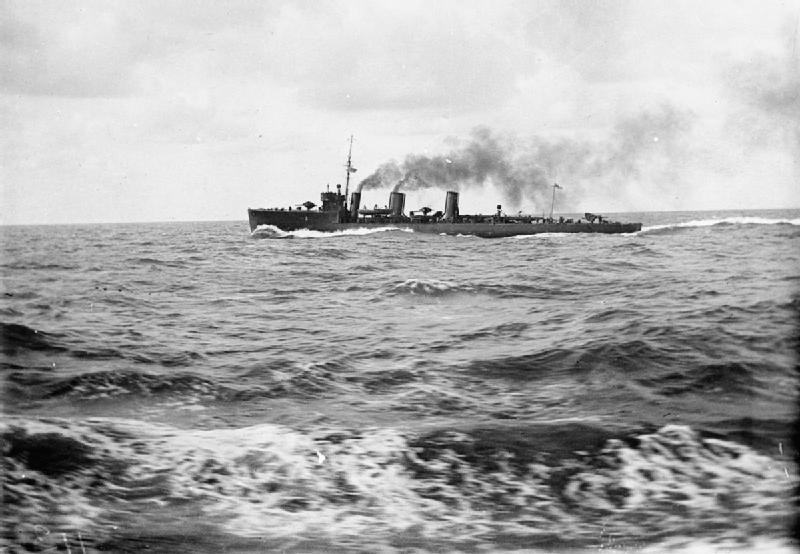
- HMS Loyal, October 1914

Class overview
- Name: Laforey- or L-class destroyer
- Operators: Royal Navy
- Preceded by: Acasta class
- Succeeded by: Admiralty M class
- Completed: 22
- Lost: 3

General characteristics
- Type: Destroyer
- Displacement: 965–1,010 long tons (980–1,026 t)
- Length: 268 ft 10 in (81.94 m) o/a
- Beam: 27 ft 8 in (8.43 m)
- Draught: 10 ft 6 in (3.20 m)
- Installed power: 24,500 shp (18,300 kW); 3–4 × water-tube boilers
- Propulsion: 2 shafts; 2 steam turbines
- Speed: 29 knots (54 km/h; 33 mph)
- Range: 1,720 nmi (3,190 km; 1,980 mi) at 15 knots (28 km/h; 17 mph)
- Complement: 74
- Armament: 3 × QF 4-inch (102 mm) Mark IV guns; 2 × QF 1.5-pounder (37 mm) or QF 2-pounder (40 mm) "pom-pom" anti-aircraft guns; 2 × twin 21-inch (533 mm) torpedo tubes

The Laforey class (redesignated in October 1913 as the L class) was a class of 22 torpedo boat destroyers of the Royal Navy, twenty of which were built under the Naval Programme of 1912–13 and a further two under the 2nd War Emergency Programme of 1914. As such they were the penultimate pre-war British destroyer design (the M class built under the Naval Programme of 1913–14 being the last design). All served during World War I during which three were lost; the survivors were all scrapped in 1921-23.

== Naming system ==
As was previous Royal Navy practice, the first 20 ships were originally allocated names with no particular systematic theme, although the majority were given names taken from Shakespearean or (Sir Walter) Scott characters. However, whilst still building in 1913 they were redesignated as the 'L' class and these original names were replaced on 30 September 1913 by new names beginning with the class letter 'L', the first ships to follow this new convention (see naming conventions for destroyers of the Royal Navy). The last pair - Lochinvar and Lassoo - were renamed in February 1915.

Novelist Alexander Fullerton included a fictional Laforey class destroyer, called the Lanyard, in his book "The blooding of the Guns", set during the battle of Jutland.

== Design ==
The Laforeys were based on the modified Acasta-class destroyer Fortune that trialled a new hull form that was slightly longer and narrower than that of the Acastas and incorporated a clipper bow. Except for the ships built by J. Samuel White (Laurel and Liberty) and by Yarrow (Lark, Landrail, Laverock and Linnet), which had two funnels, all the other ships had three funnels of equal height, the middle being thicker than the fore and aft.

Armament was increased over the Acastas, with the number of torpedo tubes doubled to two pairs - abaft the funnels - with a small searchlight platform in between. The gun armament remained as three QF 4-inch, but was more usefully distributed; with one gun each on the forecastle, between the funnels (the after pair in ships with three) and on the quarterdeck.

=== Propulsion ===
Lucifer and Leonidas were fitted with geared (as opposed to direct drive) steam turbines for increased efficiency. Llewellyn, Lennox, Lochinvar and Lassoo were the first destroyers built for the Royal Navy at William Beardmore's new naval construction yard at Dalmuir.

=== Minelayer ===
Legion was later fitted for minelaying, for which purposes her quarterdeck gun and torpedo tubes were removed and screens were erected aft of the after funnel to provide protection for mines. The screens were painted with dummy torpedo tubes and a gun so as not to identify her as a minelayer.

== Service ==
At the outbreak of World War I the Laforeys formed the 3rd Destroyer Flotilla. Lance is credited as having fired the first shot of the naval war when, in company with the flotilla leader Amphion, she sank the German auxiliary minelayer Königin Luise the day after war was declared, on 5 August 1914 in the North Sea. The particular gun concerned is preserved at the Imperial War Museum in London.

Two months later on 17 October 1914, off the Dutch island of Texel, Lance, Legion, Lennox and Loyal engaged German torpedo boats and sank S115, S117, S118 and S119 during the Battle off Texel. Lydiard (acting as flotilla leader), with Landrail, Laurel and Liberty were present at the Battle of Jutland on 31 May / 1 June 1916 as part of the 9th and 10th Destroyer Flotillas.

== Ships ==
Name	Ship Builder	Laid down	Launched	Completed	Fate
Llewellyn (ex-Picton)	William Beardmore and Company, Dalmuir	14 November 1912	30 October 1913	March 1914	Sold for scrapping on 10 March 1922
Lennox (ex-Portia)	Beardmore	14 October 1912	17 March 1914	July 1914	Sold for scrapping on 26 October 1921
Loyal (ex-Orlando)	William Denny & Brothers Limited, Dumbarton	16 September 1912	11 November 1913	May 1914	Sold for scrapping on 24 November 1921
Legion (ex-Viola)	Denny	19 September 1912	3 February 1914	July 1914	Sold for scrapping on 9 May 1921
Laforey (ex-Florizel)	Fairfield Shipbuilding and Engineering Company, Govan	9 September 1912	22 August 1913	February 1914	Mined and sunk in English Channel off Shoreham-by-Sea 23 March 1917
Lawford (ex-Ivanhoe)	Fairfield	28 September 1912	30 October 1913	March 1914	Sold for scrapping on 24 August 1922
Louis (ex-Talisman)	Fairfield	5 December 1912	30 December 1913	March 1914	Wrecked in Suvla Bay (Dardanelles) on 31 October 1915 and destroyed by Turkish coastal artillery
Lydiard (ex-Waverley)	Fairfield	14 December 1912	26 February 1914	June 1914	Sold for scrapping on 5 November 1921
Leonidas (ex-Rob Roy)	Parsons Marine Steam Turbine Company, Wallsend, (hull sub-contracted to Hawthorn Leslie & Company, Hebburn)	26 October 1912	30 October 1913	August 1914	Sold for scrapping on 9 May 1921
Lucifer (ex-Rocket)	Parsons (hull sub-contracted to Hawthorn Leslie)	26 October 1912	29 December 1913	August 1914	Sold for scrapping on 1 December 1921
Laertes (ex-Sarpedon)	Swan, Hunter & Wigham Richardson, Wallsend	6 July 1912	6 June 1913	October 1913	Sold for scrapping on 1 December 1921
Lysander (ex-Ulysses)	Swan Hunter	8 August 1912	18 August 1913	December 1913	Sold for scrapping on 9 June 1922
Lance (ex-Daring)	John I. Thornycroft & Company Limited, Woolston	1 August 1912	25 February 1914	August 1914	Sold for scrapping on 5 November 1921
Lookout (ex-Dragon)	Thornycroft	29 August 1912	27 April 1914	August 1914	Sold for scrapping on 24 August 1922
Laurel (ex-Redgauntlet)	J. Samuel White & Company, Cowes	17 August 1912	6 May 1913	March 1914	Sold for scrapping on 1 November 1921
Liberty (ex-Rosalind)	White	31 August 1912	15 September 1913	March 1914	Sold for scrapping on 5 November 1921
Lark (ex-Haughty)	Yarrow & Company, Scotstoun	28 June 1912	26 May 1913	October 1913	Sold for scrapping on 20 January 1923
Linnet (ex-Havock)	Yarrow	28 June 1912	16 August 1913	December 1913	Sold for scrapping on 4 November 1921
Laverock (ex-Hereward)	Yarrow	24 July 1912	19 November 1913	October 1914	Sold for scrapping on 9 May 1921
Landrail (ex-Hotspur)	Yarrow	24 July 1912	7 February 1914	June 1914	Sold for scrapping on 1 December 1921
Lochinvar (ex-Malice)	William Beardmore & Company, Dalmuir	9 January 1915	9 October 1915	December 1915	Sold for scrapping on 25 November 1921
Lassoo (ex-Magic)	Beardmore	24 January 1915	24 August 1915	11 October 1915	Torpedoed or mined and sunk off Maas (French: Meuse) light ship by German U-boat 13 August 1916

== Bibliography ==
- Colledge, J. J.; Warlow, Ben (2006) [1969]. Ships of the Royal Navy: The Complete Record of All Fighting Ships of the Royal Navy from the 15th Century to the Present (3rd Rev ed.). London: Chatham Publishing. ISBN 978-1-86176-281-8. OCLC 67375475.
- Dittmar, F. J. & Colledge, J. J. (1972). British Warships 1914–1919. Shepperton: Ian Allan. ISBN 0-7110-0380-7.
- Friedman, Norman (2009). British Destroyers: From Earliest Days to the Second World War. Barnsley: Seaforth. ISBN 978-1-84832-049-9.
- Gardiner, Robert & Gray, Randal (1985). Conway's All The World's Fighting Ships 1906–1921. London: Conway Maritime Press. ISBN 0-85177-245-5.
- March, Edgar J. (1966). British Destroyers: A History of Development, 1892–1953. London: Seeley Service & Co. OCLC 1894771.
