= SMS S115 =

Torpedo boat of the Imperial German Navy

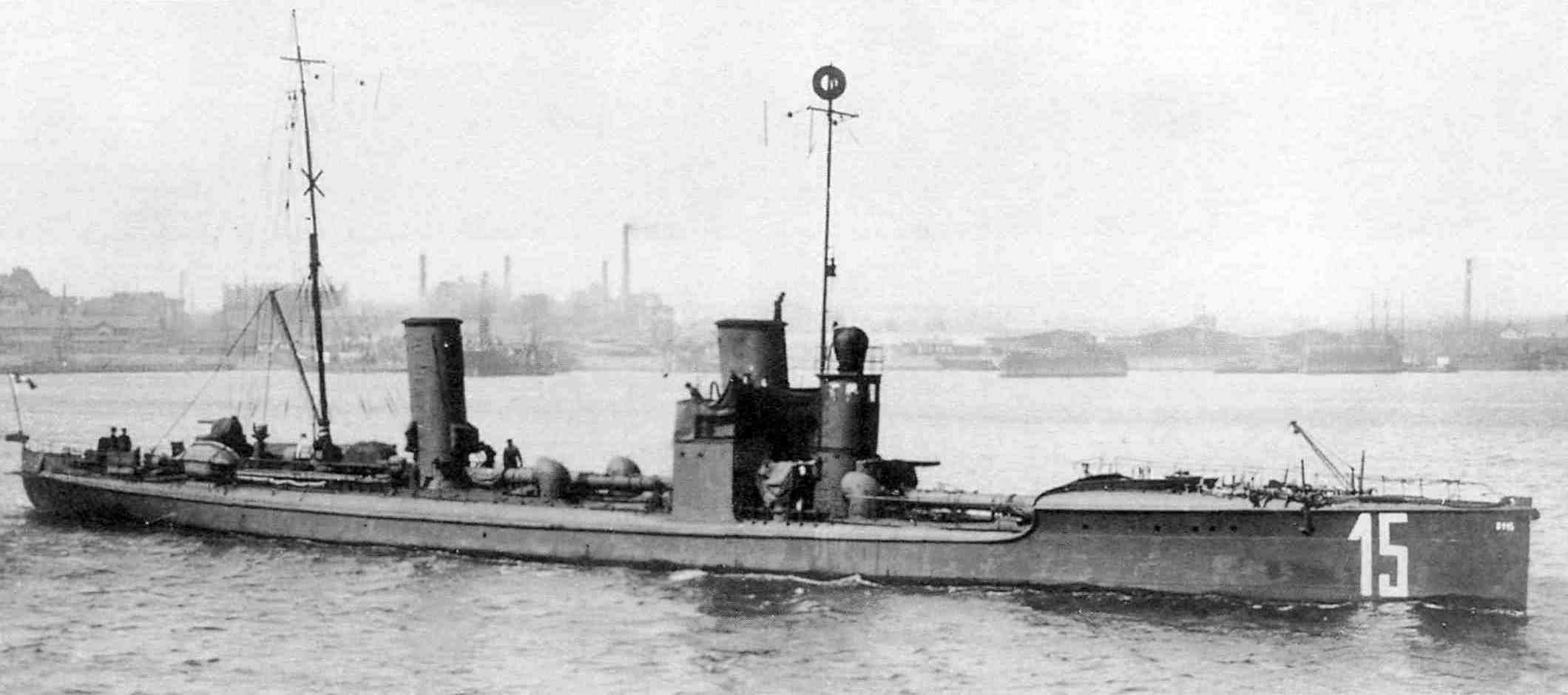

History

German Empire
- Name: SMS S115
- Builder: Schichau-Werke, Elbing
- Launched: 10 September 1902
- Commissioned: 22 February 1903
- Fate: Sunk in Battle off Texel, 17 October 1914

General characteristics
- Class & type: S90-class torpedo boat
- Displacement: 415 t (408 long tons)
- Length: 63.0 m (206 ft 8 in)
- Beam: 7.0 m (23 ft 0 in)
- Draft: 2.69 m (8 ft 10 in)
- Installed power: 5,900 PS (5,800 ihp; 4,300 kW)
- Propulsion: 3 × boilers; 2 × 3-cylinder triple expansion engines
- Speed: 27 kn (50 km/h; 31 mph)
- Range: 980 nmi (1,810 km; 1,130 mi) at 17 kn (31 km/h; 20 mph)
- Complement: 49 officers and sailors
- Armament: 3 × 5.0 cm (2.0 in) L/40 guns; 3 × 450 mm torpedo tubes

SMS S115 (Note: "SMS" stands for "Seiner Majestät Schiff" ('His Majesty's Ship')) (Note: The "S" in S115 denoted the shipbuilder who constructed her.) was a S90-class torpedo boat of the Imperial German Navy that served during the First World War. The ship was built by Schichau at Elbing in Prussia (now Elbląg in Poland), and was completed in February 1903. The ship was sunk during the Battle off Texel on 17 October 1914.

== Construction and design ==
The S90-class consisted of 48 torpedo-boats, built between 1898 and 1907 by Schichau and Germaniawerft for the Imperial German Navy. They were larger than previous German torpedo-boats, allowing them to work effectively with the High Seas Fleet in the North Sea, while also being large enough to act as flotilla leader when necessary, thus eliminating the need for separate larger division boats.

S115 was one of a group of six torpedo boats built by Schichau between 1902 and 1903. She was launched from Schichau's Elbing shipyard on 10 September 1902 and commissioned on 22 February 1903.

S115 was 63.2 metres (207 ft 4 in) long overall and 63.0 metres (206 ft 8 in) at the waterline, with a beam of 7.0 metres (23 ft 0 in) and a draft of 2.69 metres (8 ft 10 in). Displacement was 315 tonnes (310 long tons) normal and 415 tonnes (408 long tons) deep load. Three coal-fired Thornycroft three-drum water-tube boilers fed steam to 2 sets of 3-cylinder triple expansion steam engines rated at 5,900 PS (5,800 ihp; 4,300 kW), giving a design speed of 27 knots (50 km/h; 31 mph), with speeds of 28 knots (52 km/h; 32 mph) reached during sea trials. 102 tonnes (100 long tons) of coal was carried, giving a range of 980 nautical miles (1,810 km; 1,130 mi) at 17 knots (31 km/h; 20 mph).

While the S90-class were of similar size to contemporary foreign torpedo-boat destroyers, the German navy saw their role as primarily torpedo attack against opposing fleets, rather than defending their own fleet against attack, so the ships had a lighter gun armament than British destroyers, and a lower silhouette to avoid detection during night attacks. S115 had a gun armament of three 5 cm SK L/40 guns in single mounts, while torpedo armament consisted of three single 450 mm torpedo tubes (one in a well deck between the raised forecastle and the bridge, with the remaining two tubes aft of the bridge. Two reload torpedoes were carried. The ship had a complement of 49 officers and men.

== Service ==
In May 1904 S115 was part of the 6th Torpedo-boat Division of the 1st Torpedo-boat Flotilla, while in 1907, she was listed as part of the 8th Half-flotilla of the 2nd School Flotilla, remaining part of the 8th Half-Flotilla in 1908. In 1910, she was listed as part of the 9th Half-Flotilla of the 5th Torpedoboat Flotilla, remaining there until 1912. In 1913 S115 was fitted with new boilers. In 1914, S115 formed part of the 7th Half-Flotilla of the 4th Torpedo-boat Flotilla.

S115 remained part of the 7th Half-Flotilla on the outbreak of the First World War in August 1914. In October 1914, in an attempt to take advantage of the Royal Navy's distraction by operations in the English Channel, the German Navy decided to lay a minefield off the mouth of the River Thames or in The Downs. Four torpedo-boats of the 7th Half-Flotilla (S119 (leader), S115, S117 and S118) set out from the Ems on 17 October 1914, with these elderly ships selected for this mission because they were unfit for other duties and considered disposable. Later that day, the four torpedo boats ran into a British patrol on the Broad Fourteens off Terschelling in the Netherlands. The British patrol, the light cruiser Undaunted and four destroyers Lance, Legion, Lennox and Loyal of the Harwich Force, engaged the four German torpedo boats in the Battle off Texel. The German ships were unable to escape (although originally capable of 28 knots (52 km/h; 32 mph), by 1914 they were only capable of 18 knots (33 km/h; 21 mph)) and were heavily outgunned, with all four German ships sunk with little damage being done to the British ships. S115 was heavily damaged by Lance and Lennox, with survivors abandoning ship, before being finished off by Undaunted. The British rescued 34 officers and men from the four German ships, with two more picked up the next day by a neutral fishing vessel. 55 of S115's crew were lost.

== Bibliography ==
- "Action on October 17th, 1914, between the Undaunted, Legion, Loyal, Lance and Lennox and four German T. B. D's. of S. Class" (PDF). The Naval Review. V. London: The Naval Society. 1919. OCLC 9030883. Archived from the original (PDF) on 2014-09-05.
- Chesneau, Roger; Kolesnik, Eugene M., eds. (1979). Conway's All the World's Fighting Ships 1860–1905. London: Conway Maritime Press. ISBN 0-85177-133-5.
- Gardiner, Robert; Gray, Randal, eds. (1985). Conway's All The World's Fighting Ships 1906–1921. London: Conway Maritime Press. ISBN 0-85177-245-5.
- Gröner, Erich (1983). Die deutschen Kriegsschiffe 1815–1945: Band 2: Torpedoboote, Zerstörer, Schnelleboote, Minensuchboote, Minenräumboote. Koblenz, Germany: Bernard & Graefe Verlag. ISBN 3-7637-4801-6.
- Halpern, Paul G. (1994). A Naval History of World War I. London: UCL Press. ISBN 1-85728-498-4.
- Monograph No. 11: Heligoland Bight—The Action of August 28, 1914 (PDF). Naval Staff Monographs (Historical). Vol. III. The Naval Staff, Training and Staff Duties Division. 1921. pp. 110–166. OCLC 220734221.
- Monograph No. 24: Home Waters—Part II.: September and October 1914 (PDF). Naval Staff Monographs (Historical). Vol. XI. The Naval Staff, Training and Staff Duties Division. 1924.
- Scheer, Reinhard (1920). Germany's High Sea Fleet in the World War. London, New York, Toronto and Melbourne: Cassell. pp. 60–62. OCLC 2765294.
- Viscount Hythe (1912). The Naval Annual, 1912. Portsmouth, UK: J. Griffin and Co.
- Jane, Fred T. (1970) [Originally published by Sampson Low, Marston & Co. Ltd. London: 1906]. Jane's Fighting Ships 1906–7. London: David & Charles (Publishers). ISBN 0-7153-4715-2.
