= HMS Landrail (1914) =

Destroyer of the Royal Navy

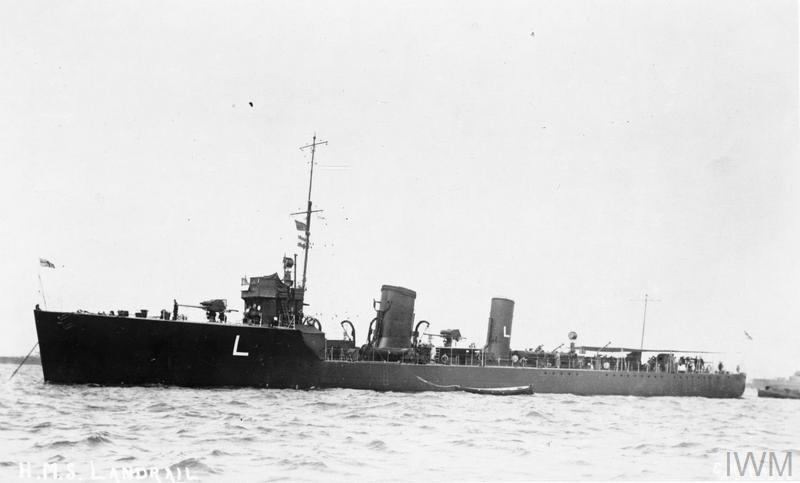
- HMS Landrail

History

United Kingdom
- Name: HMS Landrail
- Builder: Yarrow, Scotstoun
- Laid down: 24 July 1912
- Launched: 7 February 1914
- Completed: June 1914
- Fate: Sold December 1921

General characteristics
- Class & type: Laforey-class destroyer
- Displacement: 983 long tons (999 t) deep load
- Length: 268 ft 10 in (81.9 m) oa
- Beam: 27 ft 6 in (8.4 m)
- Draught: 10 ft 10 in (3.3 m)
- Installed power: 24,500 shp (18,300 kW)
- Propulsion: 3 × Yarrow boilers; Brown-Curtis steam turbines; 2 shafts
- Speed: 29 kn (54 km/h; 33 mph)
- Complement: 73
- Armament: 3 × 4-inch (102 mm) guns; 4 × 21-inch (533 mm) torpedo tubes

HMS Landrail was a Laforey-class destroyer of the British Royal Navy. The Laforey class (or L class) was the class of destroyers ordered under the Royal Navy's 1912–1913 construction programme, which were armed with three 4-inch (102 mm) guns and four torpedo tubes and were capable of 29 knots (54 km/h; 33 mph). The ship, which was originally to be named Hotspur but was renamed before launch, was built by the Scottish shipbuilder Yarrow between 1912 and 1914,

Landrail served during the First World War. She formed part of the Harwich Force in the early years of the war, taking part in the Battle of Heligoland Bight in 1914, the Battle of Dogger Bank in 1915 and the Battle of Jutland in 1916. Later in the war she joined the First Destroyer Flotilla based at Portsmouth where she served as a convoy escort. She survived the war, and was sold for scrap in 1921.

== Construction and design ==
For the 1912–1913 shipbuilding programme for the Royal Navy, the British Admiralty ordered twenty destroyers to a design based on a modified version of the previous year's Acasta-class destroyer, with the major difference being an increased torpedo armament of four torpedo tubes rather than two. Four of the destroyers were ordered from Yarrow, with four more from Fairfield, and two each from Denny, Parsons, Swan Hunter, Thonycroft, White and Beardmore.

The destroyers were 268 feet 10 inches (81.9 m) overall and 260 feet 0 inches (79.2 m) between perpendiculars, with a beam of 27 feet 6 inches (8.4 m) and a draught of 10 feet 10 inches (3.3 m). Displacement of the class ranged from 965 long tons (980 t) to 1,010 long tons (1,030 t) normal and 1,150 long tons (1,170 t) to 1,300 long tons (1,300 t) deep load, with Landrail having a normal displacement of 983 long tons (999 t). Three Yarrow boilers fed two sets of Brown-Curtis impulse steam turbines. The machinery was rated at 24,500 shaft horsepower (18,300 kW), giving a speed of 29 knots (54 km/h; 33 mph). The ship had two funnels.

The ships were armed with three 4-inch (102 mm) QF Mk IV guns, with a single .303-inch (8 mm) Maxim machine gun. Two twin 21-inch (533 mm) torpedo tubes were fitted. The ships were built with fittings to carry four mines, but these were never used. The ship's crew was 73 officers and ratings. Wartime modifications included the addition of a 2-pounder (40 mm) pom-pom anti-aircraft autocannon, the provision of depth charges, which may have resulted in one of the ship's guns and a pair of torpedo tubes being removed in 1918 to accommodate an outfit of 30–50 depth charges, while the ship was also modified to allow a kite balloon to be operated.

The second of the four Yarrow-built destroyers, Hotspur was laid down at Yarrow's Scotstoun yard on 24 July 1912. On 30 September 1913, the 1912–1913 destroyers, which were previously to be known as the Rob Roy class, were redesignated the L or Laforey class, with the ships given new names string with the letter L. Hotspur was renamed Landrail. Landrail was launched on 7 February 1914 and completed in June that year, being handed over to the Royal Navy on 10 June.

== Service ==
=== 1914–1915 ===
On the outbreak of the First World War, Landrail, like the rest of the Laforey class, joined the Harwich Force, which operated in the southern North Sea and could reinforce the Grand Fleet or forces in the English Channel as required. On 5 August 1914, the Third Destroyer Flotilla, led by the light cruiser Amphion carried out a sweep to prevent German minelayers or torpedo craft entering the English Channel. Later that morning, in response to a report from a trawler that a merchant vessel had been acting suspiciously and throwing objects overboard, Landrail and sister ship Lance were ordered ahead of the flotilla to investigate, and came across the German minelayer Königin Luise, laying mines off Southwold on the Sussex coast. The German ship attempted to escape to neutral waters, but was engaged and sunk by Lance, Landrail and Amphion. The flotilla was returning from the sweep on 6 August when it ran into the minefield laid by Königin Luise, with Amphion striking two mines and sinking, with the loss of 151 of Amphion's crew, together with 18 survivors from Königin Luise.

On 28 August 1914, the Harwich Force, supported by light cruisers and battlecruisers of the Grand Fleet, carried out a raid towards Heligoland with the intention of destroying patrolling German torpedo boats. Landrail formed part of the 2nd Division of the Third Flotilla during this operation. Landrail took part in torpedo attacks against the German light cruisers Strassburg and Mainz, with Landrail claiming one hit on Mainz. On 24 October 1914, Landrail set out from Harwich as part of the escort for the seaplane carriers Engadine and Empress on a raid against the German airship base at Cuxhaven. The force reached the launch-off point off Heligoland on the morning of 25 October, but poor weather meant that only two of the six seaplanes managed to take-off, both of which quickly abandoned the mission.

On 23 January 1915, the German battlecruisers under Admiral Franz von Hipper made a sortie to attack British fishing boats on the Dogger Bank. British Naval Intelligence was warned of the raid by radio messages decoded by Room 40, and sent out the Battlecruiser Force from Rosyth, commanded by Admiral Beatty aboard Lion and the Harwich Force, commanded by Commodore Reginald Tyrwhitt aboard the light cruiser Arethusa were sent out to intercept the German force. Landrail was part of the 1st Division of the Third Flotilla when it sailed as part of the Harwich Force. This resulted in the Battle of Dogger Bank, which took the form of a high speed chase of the German ships. The majority of the destroyers of the Harwich Force, including Landrail, were not fast enough to keep up with the battlecruisers. Only seven destroyers of the M class were fast enough to engage the German warships.

On 30 January 1915, Landrail, together with sister ships Laforey, Liberty and Lysander were detached from the Harwich Force to hunt submarines (in particular U-21) in the Irish Channel. On 13 February the four destroyers, their anti-submarine duties over, were returning to Harwich via the English Channel when poor weather forced them to take shelter in Portsmouth. They were retained at Portsmouth for escort duties until 15 February, when the ships were ordered to resume their journey to Harwich, less Landrail, which was due a refit in Glasgow. On 23 March 1915 ships of the Harwich Force escorted the seaplane carrier Empress on an attempted raid against a German radio station at Norddeich. The force ran into thick fog just as the seaplanes were due to be launched, causing the operation to be abandoned. Landrail collided with the light cruiser Undaunted in the fog and was badly damaged, with her bow smashed. While at first she managed to make her way slowly under how own power, but bulkheads at her bow began to leak and she had to be towed stern-first, first by the destroyer Mentor, then after the tow line parted, by the cruiser Aurora until the line failed again, when the cruiser Arethusa took over, finally reaching Harwich after three days.

In July 1915 three divisions of the Third Destroyer Flotilla were detached to Devonport on escort duties in the South West approaches, relieving the Tenth Flotilla, also part of the Harwich Force. On 8–9 August 1915 Landrail took part in a large scale hunt off southwest Ireland for the German submarines U-34 and U-35. The hunt, which involved one light cruiser, one destroyer leader, eight destroyers and four sloops, was unsuccessful. In September 1915 the 3rd Destroyer Flotilla was renumbered the 9th Destroyer Flotilla, still remaining part of the Harwich Force, with Landrail remaining part of the new formation.

=== 1916 ===
On 31 May–1 June 1916, Landrail was one of four Laforey-class destroyers of the Ninth Flotilla that were attached to Beatty's battlecruisers at the Battle of Jutland. (Note: The others were Lydiard, Liberty and Laurel.) Landrail formed part of the destroyer screen for the Second Battlecruiser Squadron. The destroyers were on the port, engaged, side of the battlecruisers during the "Run to the South", and reported spotting a periscope and that a torpedo track passed underneath her, although these supposed sightings were incorrect. During the night action, Landrail's division passed near the German battle line and although firing was seen, it was believed at the time that they were British ships, and no attack was made.

On 4 August 1916 Landrail was one of four destroyers of the Harwich Force that were despatched for anti-submarine operations off Le Havre. On 28 September 1916 Landrail sailed as part of the Harwich Force in support of a planned air reconnaissance of the Schillig Roads. A Curtiss 'America' flying boat was to carry out a reconnaissance flight, then alight and refuel from the Harwich Force, which would be waiting near Terschelling. Poor weather caused the operation to be abandoned while the flying boat was still on its out-bound leg, but when it landed near Landrail to refuel, the destroyer collided with the flying boat when attempting to refuel it, damaging the aircraft's wing and making it unflyable. Attempts, first by Landrail and then by the leader Lightfoot to tow the flying boat back to Britain almost succeeded, but it collapsed and sank close to the British coast. As the losses of shipping to attacks by German submarines grew heavier, the destroyers of the Harwich Force and the Grand Fleet were increasingly diverted to anti-submarine operations. On the night of 12/13 December 1916, Landrail was on patrol in the Dover Strait when a submerging submarine was spotted. Landrail dropped two depth charges in response, and the attack was credited as a 'Possible', but post war assessment indicated that the German submarine UB-29 was sunk.

=== 1917–1918 ===
On the night of 25 February 1917 the Germans launched a major raid by Flanders-based torpedo boats against Allied defences and shipping in the Channel. One group of five torpedo boats were to operate against shipping near the North Foreland lighthouse and The Downs, while a second group of six torpedo boats were to attack the patrol boats of the Dover Barrage, while three more torpedo boats were to attack shipping off the mouth of the River Maas. Landrail was one of five destroyers patrolling the Barrage. The attack on the Dover Barrage withdrew after a confrontation with the British destroyer Laverock, while the attack on the Downs carried out a brief bombardment of the North Foreland and Margate before withdrawing, hitting a house and killing three civilians but doing little other damage.

Landrail was still listed as a member of the Harwich Force at the start of March 1917, but joined the Dover Patrol on 15 March. On 22 May the Dover Patrol carried out a bombardment of the German held Belgian port of Zeebrugge, using the monitors Erebus, Terror and Marshal Soult, with the hope of destroying the locks on the canal that linked Zeebrugge to Bruges. Landrail formed part of the escort force for the operation. The operation failed to hit the locks.

Landrail's stay at Dover was short, leaving on 31 May and joining the Portsmouth escort flotilla. On 7 July 1917, Landrail, together with the destroyers Beaver, Forester and Ettrick and the patrol boats P22, P25, P32 and P54, was escorting convoy HH4 of five merchant ships up the Channel. The convoy was off Beachy Head when a torpedo, fired by the German submarine UC-61, hit Ettrick, blowing the destroyer in two, with the forward part sinking quickly. The aft part of Ettrick was towed into Portsmouth by P25. Landrail was part of the First Destroyer Flotilla at Portsmouth in July 1917.

Landrail remained part of the First Flotilla at the start of January 1918, but by February had moved to the Firth of Forth, joining the Methil Convoy Flotilla.

== Disposal ==
Landrail was sold for scrap to the shipbreakers Stanlee of Dover on 1 December 1921.

== Pennant numbers ==
Pennant number	Dates
H54	1914–January 1918
H47	January 1918–
