= Cecil H. Fox =

Irish Royal Navy officer (1873–1963)

Captain Cecil H. Fox CB
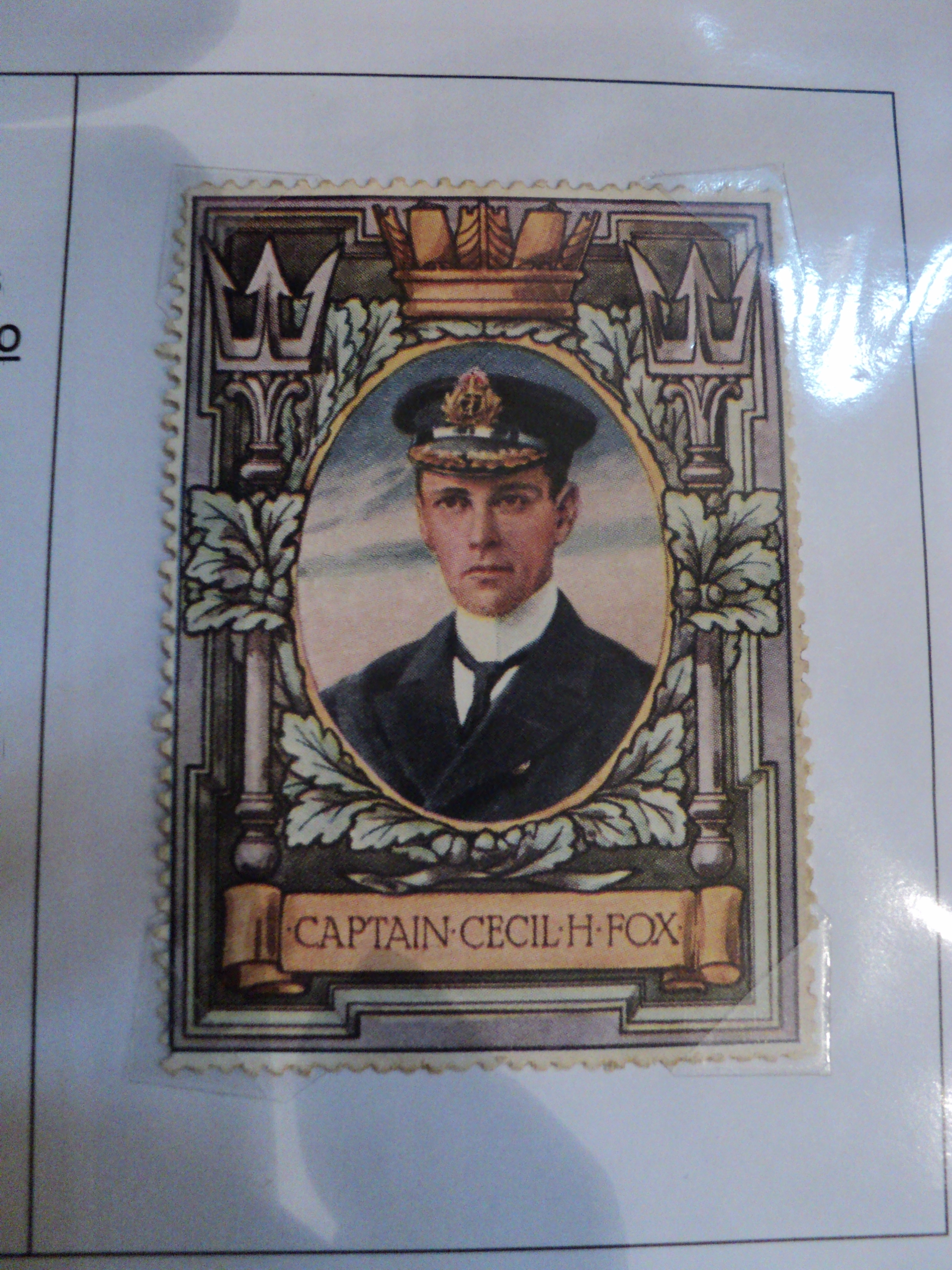
- Cinderella stamp of Fox
- Born: 27 May 1873; Dublin, Ireland
- Died: 2 April 1963; Dorset, England
- Allegiance: United Kingdom
- Branch: Royal Navy
- Rank: Captain
- Commands: HMS Boadicea; HMS Forward; HMS Amphion; HMS Undaunted
- Battles / wars: World War I; Battle off Texel; Raid on Cuxhaven

Captain Cecil Henry Fox CB (27 May 1873 – 2 Apr 1963) was an Irish officer in the Royal Navy.

== Biography ==
He was born 27 May 1873 in Dublin, Ireland, and joined the Royal Navy 15 January 1886. He was promoted to the rank of captain on 31 December 1911.

He was made Captain D of the 3rd Destroyer Flotilla on 3 April 1913 commanding the flotilla from HMS Boadicea and from August of that year from HMS Forward. He later commanded HMS Amphion, which on 5 August 1914 sank the German minelayer Königin Luise, the first German naval loss of the war. Amphion was sunk shortly afterwards after striking one of Königin Luise's mines. Fox transferred to command HMS Undaunted, and on 17 October 1914 took part in the defeat of four German torpedo boats at the Battle off Texel. He was also involved in the Raid on Cuxhaven on Christmas Day, 1914.

He was subject of one of the 240 Cinderella Stamps issued for the Lord Roberts Memorial Fund.

Fox died at this home in Sherborne, Dorset on 2 April 1963, aged 89. He was buried on 6 April 1963.
