= Alma A. E. Holmes =

Four-masted schooner

History

United States
- Name: Alma A. E. Holmes
- Owner: Joseph Holmes
- Launched: 1896
- Fate: Sunk after collision, October 10, 1914

General characteristics
- Type: Schooner
- Tonnage: 1,200 tons
- Length: 202 ft (62 m)
- Beam: 41 ft (12 m)
- Draft: 18 ft (5.5 m)
- Sail plan: Full-rigged ship

Alma A. E. Holmes was a four-masted schooner that was used to transport coal. She sank on October 10, 1914, following a collision with the steamer Belfast.

== The ship ==
The Alma A. E. Holmes was a 1,200-ton wooden-hulled ship built in 1896 in Camden, Maine, and named after the daughter of owner Joseph Holmes. She was 202 feet (62 m) long, with a 41-foot (12 m) beam and an 18-foot (5.5 m) draft.

== The wreck ==
On October 10, 1914, the Alma Holmes carried coal from Norfolk, Virginia, intended for Lehigh Coal Yards in Salem, Massachusetts. While off the coast of Marblehead, Massachusetts, in thick fog, she was hit on the starboard side by the steamer Belfast which smashed straight through the wooden hull of the Alma A. E. Holmes. The Belfast had dug so deep into the hull of the Alma A. E. Holmes that the captain decided not to reverse until the crew had disembarked. After all crew members had been rescued, the Belfast reversed and in one minute's time the Alma A. E. Holmes sank. No one was killed during the episode.

She lies in 160 feet (49 m) of water at approximately 42°26′6″N 70°44′54″W.
