= HMS Lance (1914) =

Destroyer of the Royal Navy

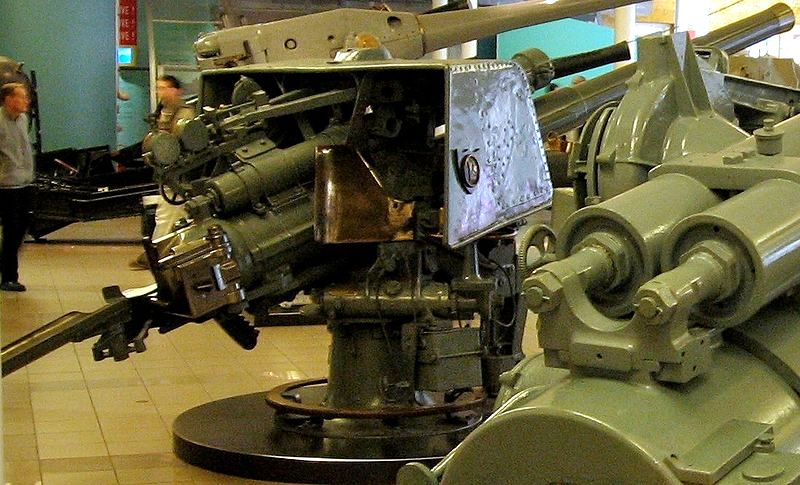
- QF 4 inch Mk IV gun from HMS Lance that fired the first British shot of World War I.

History

United Kingdom
- Name: HMS Lance
- Ordered: 29 March 1912
- Builder: John I. Thornycroft & Company
- Laid down: 1 August 1912
- Launched: 25 February 1914
- Completed: August 1914
- Fate: Sold and broken up November 1921

General characteristics
- Class & type: Laforey-class destroyer
- Displacement: 965-1,300 tons
- Length: 269 ft (82 m)
- Beam: 26 ft 9 in (8.15 m)
- Draught: 9 ft 6 in (2.90 m)
- Propulsion: Water-tube boilers, Parsons steam turbines, 2 shafts, 24,500 shp
- Speed: 29 knots (54 km/h)
- Complement: 73
- Armament: 3 × QF 4-inch (101.6 mm) Mk IV guns, mounting P Mk. IX; 1 × QF 2 pdr pom-pom Mk. II; 2 × twin tubes for 21 in torpedoes

HMS Lance was a Laforey-class destroyer of the Royal Navy. Launched a few months before the outbreak of the First World War and attached to the Harwich Force, Lance took part in several engagements during the war, including the sinking of the Königin Luise and the Battle off Texel. She was responsible for firing the first British shot of the war.

== Construction ==
HMS Lance was originally to be named Daring but the entire Laforey-class had their names changed to alphabetically homogeneous ones in 1913. Lance was ordered on 29 March 1912 from John I. Thornycroft & Company and was laid down on 1 August 1912. The ship was launched on 25 February 1914 and completed in August 1914.

Lance had an overall length of 268 feet 10 inches (81.94 m) with a beam of 27 feet 8 inches (8.43 m) and a draught of 10 feet 6 inches (3.20 m). She was fitted with three QF Mk IV (102 mm) guns, a single QF 2 pdr pom-pom Mk. II, and four torpedo tubes in two twin mounts.

== Service ==
Following the start of the First World War at 2300 GMT on 4 August 1914, Lance, assigned to the 3rd Destroyer Flotilla of the Harwich Force, took part in a sweep of the North Sea. The next day, Lance and her sister ship Landrail were sent to investigate a report from a trawler of a ship dropping mines. The two destroyers encountered the German minelayer and former excursion steamer Königin Luise deploying mines. Lance fired a shell from one of her 4-inch guns at Königin Luise which was the first British shot of the war. The minelayer at first attempted to flee, but when her captain realised that escape was impossible, he ordered her to be scuttled instead. Lance picked up 28 survivors from the German ship. Lance′s gun is on display at the National Museum of the Royal Navy, Portsmouth, on loan from the Imperial War Museum, London.

On 28 August 1914, along with the rest of the 3rd Destroyer Flotilla, Lance took part in the Battle of Heligoland Bight. On 17 October 1914 Lance was with her flotilla when it attacked the German Seventh Half Flotilla of torpedo boats off Texel, completely annihilating the German force. On 29 November 1915 Lance took part in a sweep by the Harwich Force into the Skagerrak. Poor weather and the absence of enemy shipping caused the mission to be aborted, and while the force was turning for home, a sailor was washed overboard from Lance, but was rescued by Legion.

In 1916, Lance transferred to the 9th Destroyer Flotilla, still part of the Harwich force. On 1 June 1916, the Harwich force sortied to reinforce the Grand Fleet following the Battle of Jutland. Lance was one of eight destroyers detached to screen the damaged battleship Marlborough, which had been torpedoed during the battle, helping to escort the battleship to the Humber for temporary repair. On 13 August Lance, together with sister ships Lassoo, Laverock and Lennox, was escorting a convoy of seven merchant ships between Britain and the Netherlands when Lasso was hit by a torpedo from the German submarine UB-10. Lance attempted to salvage the stricken destroyer but Lasso broke in two and sank, with all but four of Lasso's crew being rescued.

In March 1917, Lance transferred to the Sixth Flotilla as part of the Dover Patrol, leaving the Flotilla in July that year. By October 1917, Lance was part of the Fourth Destroyer Flotilla, based at Devonport, remaining part of this flotilla on 1 December 1918.

Lance was laid up under Care and Maintenance at the Nore in December 1919, and was sold for scrap on 5 November 1921.
