= HMS Loyal (1913) =

Destroyer of the Royal Navy

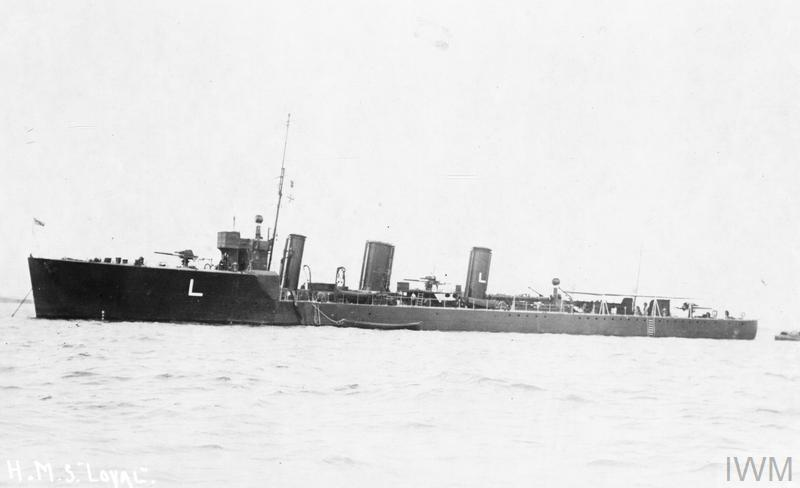
- Loyal

History

United Kingdom
- Name: HMS Loyal
- Builder: William Denny and Brothers
- Launched: 11 November 1913
- Fate: Sold and broken up November 1921

General characteristics
- Class & type: Laforey-class destroyer
- Displacement: 965–1,010 long tons (980–1,026 t)
- Length: 268 ft 10 in (81.94 m) o/a
- Beam: 27 ft 8 in (8.43 m)
- Draught: 10 ft 6 in (3.20 m)
- Installed power: 24,500 shp (18,300 kW); 4 × Yarrow boilers
- Propulsion: 2 Shafts; 2 steam turbines
- Speed: 29 knots (54 km/h; 33 mph)
- Range: 1,720 nmi (3,190 km; 1,980 mi) at 15 knots (28 km/h; 17 mph)
- Complement: 74
- Armament: 3 × QF 4-inch (102 mm) Mark IV guns; 2 × twin 21-inch (533 mm) torpedo tubes

HMS Loyal was a Laforey-class destroyer built for the Royal Navy during the 1910s.

== Description ==
The Laforey class was the improved and faster versions of the preceding Acasta class. They displaced 965–1,010 long tons (980–1,026 t). The ships had an overall length of 268 feet 10 inches (81.9 m), a beam of 27 feet 8 inches (8.4 m) and a draught of 10 feet 6 inches (3.2 m). Loyal was powered by two Parsons direct-drive steam turbines, each driving one propeller shaft, using steam provided by four Yarrow boilers. The turbines developed a total of 24,500 shaft horsepower (18,300 kW) and gave a maximum speed of 29 knots (54 km/h; 33 mph). The ships carried a maximum of 280 long tons (280 t) of fuel oil that gave them a range of 1,750 nautical miles (3,240 km; 2,010 mi) at 15 knots (28 km/h; 17 mph). The ships' complement was 74 officers and ratings.

The ships were armed with three single QF 4-inch (102 mm) Mark IV guns. The ships were also fitted with two above-water twin mounts for 21-inch (533 mm) torpedoes. They were equipped with rails to carry four Vickers Elia Mk IV mines, although these rails were never used.

== Construction and service ==
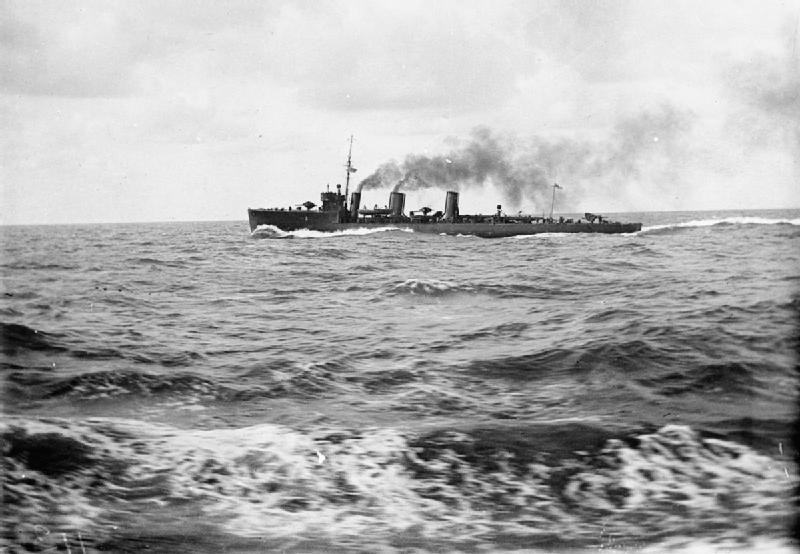
HMS Loyal in 1914

The ship was laid down as Orlando at William Denny and Brothers' Dumbarton shipyard on 16 September 1912. The whole class was then renamed with names beginning with the letter "L" on 30 September 1913, with Orlando being renamed Loyal. Loyal was launched on 11 November 1913 and completed in May 1914.

Loyal joined the 3rd Destroyer Flotilla after commissioning. On the outbreak of the First World War this Flotilla became part of the Harwich Force, under the overall command of Commodore Reginald Tyrwhitt, which operated in the southern North Sea and could reinforce the Grand Fleet or forces in the English Channel as required. Loyal saw action in several engagements, including the Battle off Texel.

== Bibliography ==
- Colledge, J. J.; Warlow, Ben (2006) [1969]. Ships of the Royal Navy: The Complete Record of All Fighting Ships of the Royal Navy from the 15th Century to the Present (3rd Rev ed.). London: Chatham Publishing. ISBN 978-1-86176-281-8. OCLC 67375475.
- Dittmar, F.J. & Colledge, J.J. (1972). British Warships 1914–1919. Shepperton, UK: Ian Allan. ISBN 0-7110-0380-7.
- Friedman, Norman (2009). British Destroyers: From Earliest Days to the Second World War. Barnsley, UK: Seaforth Publishing. ISBN 978-1-84832-049-9.
- Gardiner, Robert & Gray, Randal (1985). Conway's All The World's Fighting Ships 1906–1921. London: Conway Maritime Press. ISBN 0-85177-245-5.
- Manning, T. D. (1961). The British Destroyer. London: Putnam.
- Monograph No. 11: The Battle of the Heligoland Bight, August 28th, 1914 (PDF). Naval Staff Monographs (Historical). Vol. III. Naval Staff, Training and Staff Duties Division. 1921. pp. 108–166.
