= HMS Lennox (1914) =

Destroyer of the Royal Navy

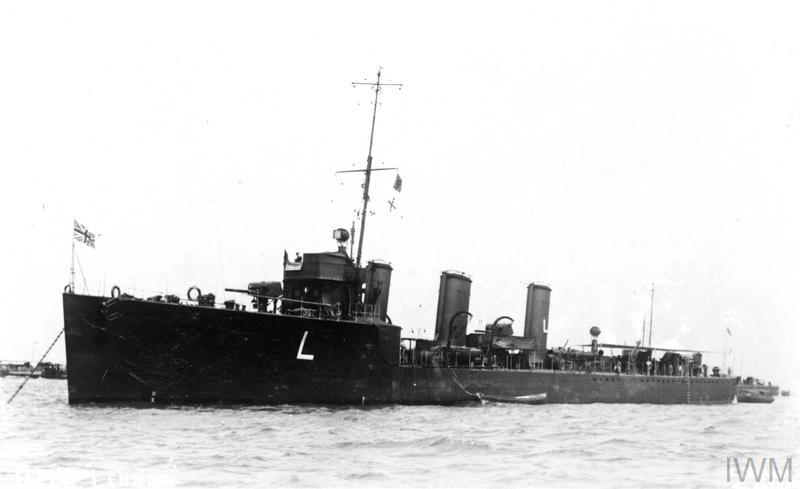
- Lennox

History

United Kingdom
- Name: HMS Lennox
- Builder: William Beardmore and Company
- Launched: 2 March 1914
- Fate: Sold and broken up October 1921

General characteristics
- Class & type: Laforey-class destroyer
- Displacement: 965–1,010 long tons (980–1,026 t)
- Length: 268 ft 10 in (81.94 m) o/a
- Beam: 27 ft 8 in (8.43 m)
- Draught: 10 ft 6 in (3.20 m)
- Installed power: 24,500 shp (18,300 kW); 4 × Yarrow boilers
- Propulsion: 2 Shafts; 2 steam turbines
- Speed: 29 knots (54 km/h; 33 mph)
- Range: 1,720 nmi (3,190 km; 1,980 mi) at 15 knots (28 km/h; 17 mph)
- Complement: 74
- Armament: 3 × QF 4-inch (102 mm) Mark IV guns; 2 × QF 1.5-pounder (37 mm) or QF 2-pounder (40 mm) "pom-pom" anti-aircraft guns; 2 × twin 21-inch (533 mm) torpedo tubes

HMS Lennox was a Laforey-class destroyer built for the Royal Navy during the 1910s.

== Description ==
The Laforey class were improved and faster versions of the preceding Acasta class. They displaced 965–1,010 long tons (980–1,026 t). The ships had an overall length of 268 feet 10 inches (81.9 m), a beam of 27 feet 8 inches (8.4 m) and a draught of 10 feet 6 inches (3.2 m). Lennox was powered by two Parsons direct-drive steam turbines, each driving one propeller shaft, using steam provided by four Yarrow boilers. The turbines developed a total of 24,500 shaft horsepower (18,300 kW) and gave a maximum speed of 29 knots (54 km/h; 33 mph). The ships carried a maximum of 280 long tons (280 t) of fuel oil that gave them a range of 1,750 nautical miles (3,240 km; 2,010 mi) at 15 knots (28 km/h; 17 mph). The ships' complement was 74 officers and ratings.

The ships were armed with three single QF 4-inch (102 mm) Mark IV guns and two QF 1.5-pounder (37 mm) anti-aircraft guns. These latter guns were later replaced by a pair of QF 2-pounder (40 mm) "pom-pom" anti-aircraft guns. The ships were also fitted with two above-water twin mounts for 21-inch (533 mm) torpedoes. They were equipped with rails to carry four Vickers Elia Mk IV mines, although these rails were never used.

== Construction and service ==
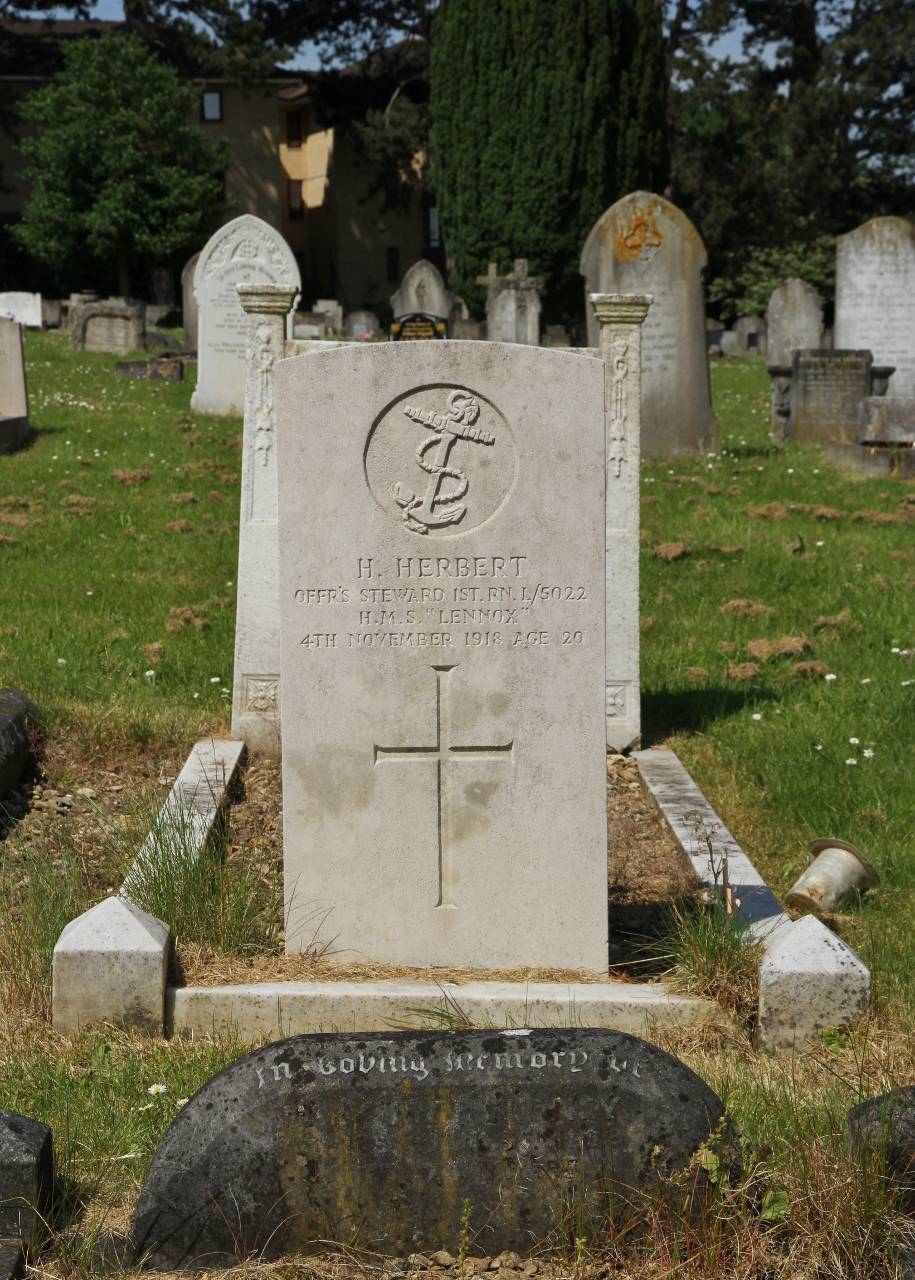
Headstone in Cowley, Oxfordshire of H Herbert, Officer's Steward First Class, who served on Lennox and died a week before the Armistice of 11 November 1918

Lennox was laid down at William Beardmore and Company's Clydebank shipyard as Portia on 14 November 1912. On 30 September 1913, the Admiralty ordered that the L-class be renamed with names beginning with the letter "L", and Portia was renamed Lennox. She was launched on 17 March 1914 on completed in July that year.

On commissioning, Lennox joined the 3rd Destroyer Flotilla, based at The Nore. On the outbreak of the First World War this Flotilla became part of the Harwich Force, under the overall command of Commodore Reginald Tyrwhitt, serving in the North Sea, but capable of reinforcing either the Grand Fleet or forces in the English Channel as required. Lennox saw action in several engagements, including the Battle off Texel. On 6 May 1916, Lennox accidentally collided with HMS Ben-my-Chree, a seaplane carrier. Damage was insignificant for both ships, however.

== Bibliography ==
- Caruana, J.; Field, Andy; Head, Michael; et al. (December 2012). "Question 33/48: British Seaplane Tender Sunk by Turkish Artillery". Warship International. Vol. 49, no. 4. Toledo, Ohio: International Naval Research Organization. pp. 297–99. ISSN 0043-0374.
- Colledge, J. J.; Warlow, Ben (2006) [1969]. Ships of the Royal Navy: The Complete Record of All Fighting Ships of the Royal Navy from the 15th Century to the Present (3rd Rev ed.). London: Chatham Publishing. ISBN 978-1-86176-281-8. OCLC 67375475.
- Dittmar, F.J. & Colledge, J.J. (1972). British Warships 1914–1919. Shepperton, UK: Ian Allan. ISBN 0-7110-0380-7.
- Friedman, Norman (2009). British Destroyers: From Earliest Days to the Second World War. Barnsley, UK: Seaforth Publishing. ISBN 978-1-84832-049-9.
- Gardiner, Robert & Gray, Randal (1985). Conway's All The World's Fighting Ships 1906–1921. London: Conway Maritime Press. ISBN 0-85177-245-5.
- Manning, T. D. (1961). The British Destroyer. London: Putnam.
- Massie, Robert K. (2007). Castles of Steel: Britain, Germany and the Winning of the War at Sea. London: Vintage Books. ISBN 978-0-099-52378-9.
- Monograph No. 6: The Passage of the British Expeditionary Force, August, 1914 (PDF). Naval Staff Monographs (Historical). Vol. III. Naval Staff, Training and Staff Duties Division. 1921. pp. 1–70.
- Monograph No. 11: The Battle of the Heligoland Bight, August 28th, 1914 (PDF). Naval Staff Monographs (Historical). Vol. III. Naval Staff, Training and Staff Duties Division. 1921. pp. 108–166.
