= HMS Legion (1914) =

Destroyer of the Royal Navy

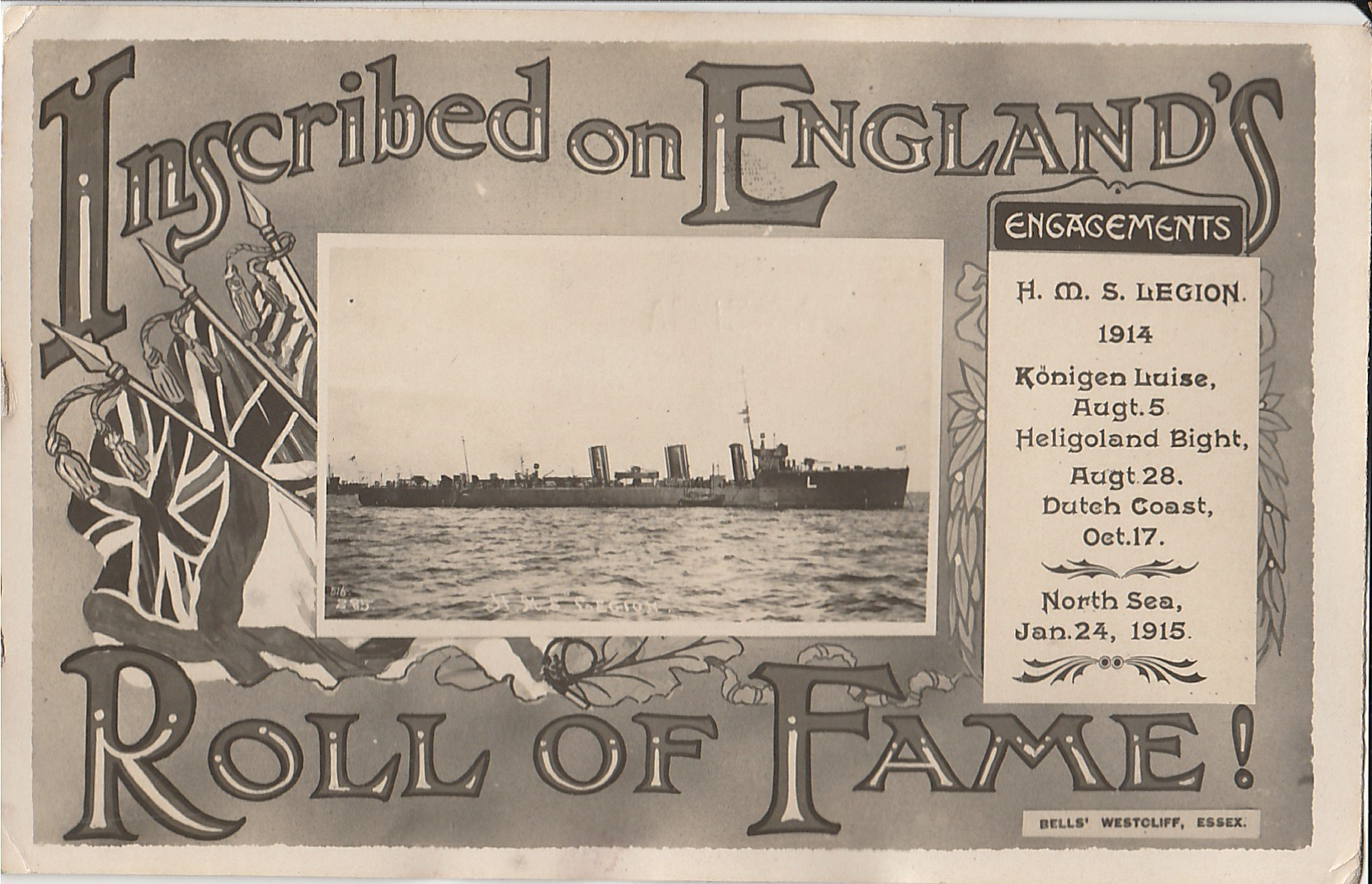
- Photo postcard of HMS Legion (1914)

History

United Kingdom
- Name: HMS Legion (ex-Viola)
- Builder: William Denny and Brothers
- Launched: 3 February 1914
- Fate: Sold in 1921

General characteristics
- Class & type: Laforey-class destroyer
- Displacement: 965–1,010 long tons (980–1,026 t)
- Length: 268 ft 10 in (81.94 m) o/a
- Beam: 27 ft 8 in (8.43 m)
- Draught: 10 ft 6 in (3.20 m)
- Installed power: 24,500 shp (18,300 kW); 4 × Yarrow boilers
- Propulsion: 2 Shafts; 2 steam turbines
- Speed: 29 knots (54 km/h; 33 mph)
- Range: 1,720 nmi (3,190 km; 1,980 mi) at 15 knots (28 km/h; 17 mph)
- Complement: 74
- Armament: 3 × QF 4-inch (102 mm) Mark IV guns; 2 × QF 1.5-pounder (37 mm) or QF 2-pounder (40 mm) "pom-pom" anti-aircraft guns; 2 × twin 21-inch (533 mm) torpedo tubes

HMS Legion was a Laforey-class destroyer built for the Royal Navy during the 1910s.

== Description ==
The Laforey class were improved and faster versions of the preceding Acasta class. They displaced 965–1,010 long tons (980–1,026 t). The ships had an overall length of 268 feet 10 inches (81.9 m), a beam of 27 feet 8 inches (8.4 m) and a draught of 10 feet 6 inches (3.2 m). Legion was powered by two Parsons direct-drive steam turbines, each driving one propeller shaft, using steam provided by four Yarrow boilers. The turbines developed a total of 24,500 shaft horsepower (18,300 kW) and gave a maximum speed of 29 knots (54 km/h; 33 mph). The ships carried a maximum of 280 long tons (280 t) of fuel oil that gave them a range of 1,750 nautical miles (3,240 km; 2,010 mi) at 15 knots (28 km/h; 17 mph). The ships' complement was 74 officers and ratings.

The ships were armed with three single QF 4-inch (102 mm) Mark IV guns and two QF 1.5-pounder (37 mm) anti-aircraft guns. These latter guns were later replaced by a pair of QF 2-pounder (40 mm) "pom-pom" anti-aircraft guns. The ships were also fitted with two above-water twin mounts for 21-inch (533 mm) torpedoes. They were equipped with rails to carry four Vickers Elia Mk IV mines, although these rails were never used.

== Construction and service ==
Legion was constructed by William Denny and Brothers. She was laid down on 19 September 1912, launched on 3 February 1914 and was completed in July 1914, joining the 3rd Destroyer Flotilla, based at The Nore following commissioning on 15 July.

She was attached to the Harwich Force and served in the North Sea. The ship saw action in several engagements, including the Battle off Texel. Legion was severely damaged by a German mine on 10 November 1916. It was decided to convert Legion to allow use for minelaying while under repair. Rails were fitted to allow the carrying of up to 40 mines.

== Bibliography ==
- Colledge, J. J.; Warlow, Ben (2006) [1969]. Ships of the Royal Navy: The Complete Record of All Fighting Ships of the Royal Navy from the 15th Century to the Present (3rd Rev ed.). London: Chatham Publishing. ISBN 978-1-86176-281-8. OCLC 67375475.
- Dittmar, F.J. & Colledge, J.J. (1972). British Warships 1914–1919. Shepperton, UK: Ian Allan. ISBN 0-7110-0380-7.
- Friedman, Norman (2009). British Destroyers: From Earliest Days to the Second World War. Barnsley, UK: Seaforth Publishing. ISBN 978-1-84832-049-9.
- Gardiner, Robert & Gray, Randal (1985). Conway's All The World's Fighting Ships 1906–1921. London: Conway Maritime Press. ISBN 0-85177-245-5.
- Manning, T. D. (1961). The British Destroyer. London: Putnam.
- Smith, Peter C. (2005). Into the Minefields: British Destroyer Minelaying 1916–1960. Barnsley, UK: Pen & Sword Maritime. ISBN 1-84415-271-5.
