= HMS Undaunted (1914) =

Royal Navy Arethusa-class light cruiser

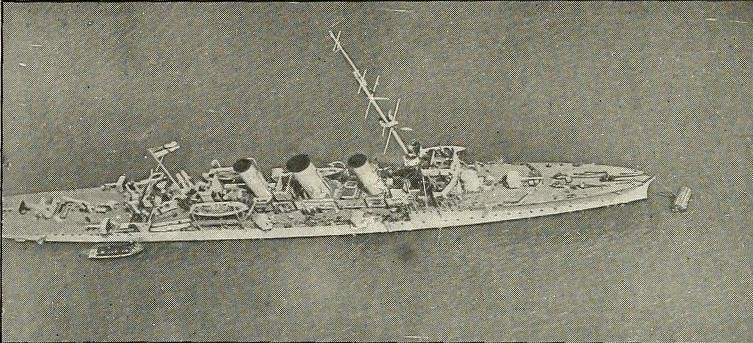
- Aerial view circa. 1914-1918

History

United Kingdom
- Name: Undaunted
- Builder: Fairfield Shipbuilding and Engineering Company, Govan
- Laid down: 21 December 1912
- Launched: 28 April 1914
- Commissioned: August 1914
- Identification: Pennant number: 2C (1914); A5 (Jan 18); 80 (Apr 18); P.06 (Nov 19)
- Fate: Sold for scrap, 9 April 1923

General characteristics (as built)
- Class & type: Arethusa-class light cruiser
- Displacement: 3,512 long tons (3,568 t)
- Length: 436 ft (132.9 m) (o/a)
- Beam: 39 ft (11.9 m)
- Draught: 15 ft 7 in (4.75 m) (mean, deep load)
- Installed power: 8 × Yarrow boilers; 40,000 shp (30,000 kW)
- Propulsion: 4 × shafts; 4 × steam turbines
- Speed: 28.5 kn (52.8 km/h; 32.8 mph)
- Complement: 270
- Armament: 2 × single 6 in (152 mm) guns; 6 × single 4 in (102 mm) guns; 1 × single 3-pdr (47 mm (1.9 in)) AA gun; 2 × twin 21 in (533 mm) torpedo tubes
- Armour: Waterline belt: 1–3 in (25–76 mm); Deck: 1 in (25 mm)

HMS Undaunted was one of eight Arethusa-class light cruisers built for the Royal Navy in the 1910s.

== Design and description ==
The Arethusa-class cruisers were intended to lead destroyer flotillas and defend the fleet against attacks by enemy destroyers. The ships were 456 feet 6 inches (139.1 m) long overall, with a beam of 49 feet 10 inches (15.2 m) and a deep draught of 15 feet 3 inches (4.6 m). Displacement was 3,512 long tons (3,568 t) at normal and 4,400 long tons (4,500 t) at full load. Undaunted was powered by four Brown-Curtis steam turbines, each driving one propeller shaft, which produced a total of 40,000 indicated horsepower (30,000 kW). The turbines used steam generated by eight Yarrow boilers which gave her a speed of about 28.5 knots (52.8 km/h; 32.8 mph). She carried 840 long tons (853 t) tons of fuel oil that gave a range of 3,200 nautical miles (5,900 km; 3,700 mi) at 16 knots (30 km/h; 18 mph).

The main armament of the Arethusa-class ships consisted of two BL 6-inch (152 mm) Mk XII guns that were mounted on the centreline fore and aft of the superstructure and six QF 4-inch Mk V guns in waist mountings. They were also fitted with a single QF 3-pounder 47 mm (1.9 in) anti-aircraft gun and four 21 in (533 mm) torpedo tubes in two twin mounts.

== Construction and career ==
She was launched on 28 April 1914 at Fairfield Shipbuilding and Engineering Company's shipyard at Govan. Undaunted participated in numerous naval operations during the First World War. On commissioning she was assigned as the leader of the 3rd Destroyer Flotilla of the Harwich Force, guarding the eastern approaches to the English Channel. On 28 August 1914, Undaunted took part in the Battle of Heligoland Bight, and on 17 October 1914 she was involved in an action off the Dutch island of Texel with German torpedo boats. On 25 December 1914 she participated in the Cuxhaven Raid, and on 24 January 1915 she took part in the Battle of Dogger Bank. In April 1915 Undaunted was damaged in collision with the destroyer Landrail, and on 24 March 1916 she was again damaged in a collision, this time with the light cruiser Cleopatra while covering the a raid on a Zeppelin base believed to be at Hoyer in Schleswig-Holstein. In November 1918 was reassigned to the 4th Light Cruiser Squadron of the Grand Fleet. She survived to see the end of the First World War, and was sold for scrap on 9 April 1923 to Cashmore, of Newport.

== Bibliography ==
- Brown, David K. (2010). The Grand Fleet: Warship Design and Development 1906–1922. Seaforth Publishing. ISBN 978-1-84832-085-7.
- Colledge, J. J.; Warlow, Ben & Bush, Steve (2020). Ships of the Royal Navy: The Complete Record of all Fighting Ships of the Royal Navy from the 15th Century to the Present (5th revised and updated ed.). Seaforth Publishing. ISBN 978-1-5267-9327-0.
- Corbett, Julian. Naval Operations to the Battle of the Falklands. History of the Great War: Based on Official Documents. Vol. I (2nd ed.). Imperial War Museum and Battery Press. ISBN 0-89839-256-X.
- Corbett, Julian (1997) [1929]. Naval Operations. History of the Great War: Based on Official Documents. Vol. II (Second ed.). Imperial War Museum in association with the Battery Press. ISBN 1-870423-74-7.
- Friedman, Norman (2010). British Cruisers: Two World Wars and After. Naval Institute Press. ISBN 978-1-59114-078-8.
- Newbolt, Henry (1996) [1931]. Naval Operations. History of the Great War Based on Official Documents. Vol. V. Battery Press. ISBN 0-89839-255-1.
- Pearsall, Alan (1984). "Arethusa Class Cruisers, Part I". Warship. VIII. Conway Maritime Press: 203–11. ISBN 0-87021-983-9.
- Pearsall, Alan (1984). "Arethusa Class Cruisers, Part II". Warship. VIII. Conway Maritime Press: 258–65. ISBN 0-87021-983-9.
- Preston, Antony (1985). "Great Britain and Empire Forces". In Gray, Randal (ed.). Conway's All the World's Fighting Ships 1906–1921. Naval Institute Press. pp. 1–104. ISBN 0-85177-245-5.
