= HMS Adventure (1904) =

Adventure-class cruiser

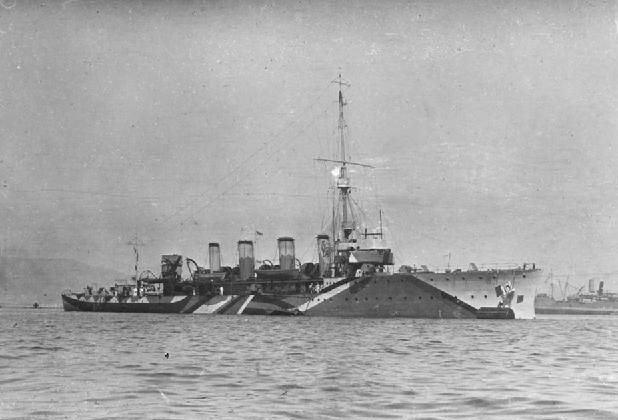
- Adventure in dazzle camouflage during the First World War

History

United Kingdom
- Name: Adventure
- Builder: Armstrong Whitworth, Elswick, Tyne and Wear
- Laid down: 7 January 1904
- Launched: 8 September 1904
- Commissioned: October 1905
- Decommissioned: 12 August 1919
- Fate: Sold for scrap, 3 March 1920

General characteristics (as built)
- Class & type: Adventure-class scout cruiser
- Displacement: 2,670 long tons (2,713 t)
- Length: 374 ft (114 m) (p/p)
- Beam: 38 ft 3 in (11.7 m)
- Draught: 12 ft 5 in (3.8 m)
- Installed power: 16,000 ihp (12,000 kW); 12 Yarrow boilers
- Propulsion: 2 Shafts, 2 triple-expansion steam engines
- Speed: 25 knots (46 km/h; 29 mph)
- Range: 2,370 nmi (4,390 km; 2,730 mi) at 10 knots (19 km/h; 12 mph)
- Complement: 289
- Armament: 10 × QF 12-pdr (3 in (76 mm)) guns; 8 × QF 3 pdr (47 mm) guns; 2 × 18 in (450 mm) torpedo tubes
- Armour: Deck: 0.75–2 in (19–51 mm); Conning tower: 3 in (76 mm)

HMS Adventure was the name ship of her class of two scout cruisers built for the Royal Navy during the first decade of the 20th century. For two years after being completed in 1905, the ship was in reserve. She was commissioned in mid-1907 as a flotilla leader in the Home Fleet. When the First World War began in August 1914, she was assigned to patrol the English Channel. In mid-1915 Adventure was transferred to Irish waters to serve as the flagship there. In early 1918, the ship escorted convoys to Gibraltar before being transferred to the Mediterranean at the end of the war. She returned home in mid-1919 and was paid off. Adventure was sold for scrap in early 1920.

== Design and description ==
The Adventure-class ships were one of four classes of scout cruisers ordered by the Admiralty. These ships were intended to work with destroyer flotillas, leading their torpedo attacks and backing them up when attacked by other destroyers, although they were rendered obsolete as faster, turbine-engined, destroyers entered service before the First World War. The ships had a length between perpendiculars of 374 feet (114 m), a beam of 38 feet 3 inches (11.7 m) and a draught of 12 feet 5 inches (3.8 m). They displaced 2,670 long tons (2,713 t) at normal load and 2,893 long tons (2,939 t) at deep load. Their crew consisted of 289 officers and ratings.

The ships were powered by a pair of three-cylinder triple-expansion steam engines, each driving one shaft, using steam provided by a dozen Yarrow boilers. The engines were designed to produce a total of 16,000 indicated horsepower (12,000 kW) which was intended to give a maximum speed of 25 knots (46 km/h; 29 mph). When Adventure ran her sea trials, she reached a speed of 25.4 knots (47.0 km/h; 29.2 mph) from 15,850 ihp (11,820 kW) for eight hours. The Adventure-class cruisers carried enough coal to give them a range of 2,370 nautical miles (4,390 km; 2,730 mi) at 10 knots (19 km/h; 12 mph).

The main armament of the Adventure class consisted of ten quick-firing (QF) 12-pounder 3 in (76 mm) 18-cwt guns. (Note: "Cwt" is the abbreviation for hundredweight, 18 cwt referring to the weight of the gun.) Three guns were mounted abreast on the forecastle and the quarterdeck, with the remaining four guns positioned port and starboard amidships. They also carried eight 3-pounder Hotchkiss guns and two above-water 18-inch (450 mm) torpedo tubes, one on each broadside. The ships' protective deck armour ranged in thickness from 0.75 to 2 inches (19 to 51 mm) and the conning tower had armour 3 inches (76 mm) inches thick.

== Construction and career ==
Adventure was laid down by Armstrong Whitworth at their shipyard in Elswick on 7 January 1904, launched on 8 September and completed in October 1905. Her original name was going to be Eddystone, but this was changed before construction began. From completion to 1907, the ship was in reserve status. Not long after completion, two additional 12-pounder guns were added and the 3-pounder guns were replaced with six QF 6-pounder Hotchkiss guns. In April Adventure collided with, and sank, a sailing boat off the Sussex coast. She was commissioned in June of that same year as the leader of the 1st Torpedo Boat Destroyer Flotilla and was refitted at Chatham Royal Dockyard in June 1910. She then became flotilla leader for the 2nd Destroyer Flotilla based in Devonport. She underwent another refit in August 1912, about which time her main guns were replaced by nine 4-inch (102 mm) guns, and then joined the 3rd Light Cruiser Squadron for the 1913 fleet manoeuvres. In July 1913, Adventure joined the 6th Destroyer Flotilla based at Dover.

In May 1915 she joined the 6th Light Cruiser Squadron on the Humber to patrol against Zeppelins raiding up the east coast. In July of that year the ship became the flagship at Queenstown until November 1917. On Boxing Day in 1915 she distinguished herself by rescuing the crew of the stricken steamship Huronian. She escorted convoys to Gibraltar during the last summer of the war, then served in the Mediterranean and, in 1919, the Aegean. She returned to Immingham docks to be paid off on 12 August 1919. Her bad luck with collisions continued when she was rammed by a trawler on the Humber in January 1920. She was then sold to the breakers for scrap on 3 March 1920 and was towed by fellow scout cruiser Skirmisher to Morecambe.

== Bibliography ==
- Brook, Peter (1999). Warships for Export: Armstrong Warships 1867 – 1927. Gravesend, Kent, UK: World Ship Society. ISBN 0-905617-89-4.
- Chesneau, Roger & Kolesnik, Eugene M., eds. (1979). Conway's All the World's Fighting Ships 1860–1905. Greenwich: Conway Maritime Press. ISBN 0-8317-0302-4.
- Friedman, Norman (2009). British Destroyers From Earliest Days to the Second World War. Annapolis, Maryland: Naval Institute Press. ISBN 978-1-59114-081-8.
- Friedman, Norman (2011). Naval Weapons of World War One. Barnsley, South Yorkshire, UK: Seaforth. ISBN 978-1-84832-100-7.
- Gardiner, Robert & Gray, Randal, eds. (1985). Conway's All the World's Fighting Ships 1906–1921. Annapolis, Maryland: Naval Institute Press. ISBN 0-85177-245-5.
- McBride, K. D. (1994). "The Royal Navy 'Scout' Class of 1904–05". Warship International. XXXI (3): 260–281. ISSN 0043-0374.
- Morris, Douglas (1987). Cruisers of the Royal and Commonwealth Navies Since 1879. Liskeard, UK: Maritime Books. ISBN 0-907771-35-1.
