= Admiral of Patrols =

UK naval command appointment

Office of the Admiral of Patrols
- Ensign of the Royal Navy
- Department of the Admiralty
- Reports to: First Sea Lord
- Nominator: First Lord of the Admiralty
- Appointer: Prime Minister; Subject to formal approval by the Queen-in-Council
- Term length: Not fixed (typically 1–2 years)
- Inaugural holder: Rear-Admiral John de Robeck
- Formation: 1912-1916

The Admiral of Patrols was a former command appointment within the Admiralty during World War I usually held by a junior flag officer. The post was established from 1912 to 1916.

== History ==
In the preceding years before World War I the Admiralty were assessing the need to protect the navy's main capital ships in the future event of any war, which would be augmented by the possible implementation a coastal patrol and mine-sweeping initiative. The need for some sort of patrol protection function being established was indicated by Admiral Lord Charles Beresford as early as 1907.

In 1909 Admiral Fisher obtained a small number of vessels for experimentation, Beginning about 1910 the Admiralty acknowledged that this sort of service may likely be in the form of local coastal patrol support for the regular navy at this time there was a lack of patrol capabilities within the Royal Navy.

On May 1, 1912 the post of Admiral of Patrols was created and under its command consisted four destroyer flotillas until 1913. In 1914, the Board of Admiralty sent an order the Admiralty War Staff asking the Chief of the War Staff to re-evaluate the patrols current functional role operating off the Eastern Coast of Great Britain the First Sea Lord envisaged that its current function of patrolling would now be that of coastal defence but would include an additional force the units of the Auxiliary Patrol. After the implementation took place Admiral de Robeck was replaced by a new commander Commodore George A. Ballard. He assumed the duties of Admiral of Patrols on the 1 May 1914 and held the post until it was abolished in 1917.

== Commodore/Admiral of Patrols ==
| | Rank | Flag | Name | Term |
|---|---|---|---|---|
Commodore/Admiral, of Patrols
| 1 | Rear-Admiral | Rear-Admiral - Royal Navy | John de Robeck | 8 April 1912 – 1 May 1914 (initially-Cdre, 1.Cls) |
| 2 | Commodore 1st Class | | George A. Ballard | 1 May 1914 - 1916 (later-R.Adm) |

== Assistant to Admiral of Patrols ==
- Captain Walter H. Cowan, 1 May 1912 – 7 February 1914
- Captain Edward G. Lowther-Crofton, 7 February 1914 – 1 February 1916

== Patrol formations under this command ==
As of May 1912 – 1914:

| # | Unit | Based at | Dates | Notes |
|---|---|---|---|---|
| 1 | 5th Destroyer Flotilla | Devonport | March 1909 – 1913 | 1 cruiser leader - 1 scout cruiser - approx 23 destroyers |
| 2 | 6th Destroyer Flotilla | Portsmouth | May 1912 – 1914 | 3 scout cruisers - approx 22 destroyers |
| 3 | 7th Destroyer Flotilla | Humber then Devonport | May 1912 – 1914 | 1 scout cruiser, 21 destroyers - 12 torpedo boats |
| 4 | 8th Destroyer Flotilla | Tyne then Chatham | May 1912 – 1914 | 1 scout cruiser - 12 destroyers - 13 torpedo boat destroyers |
| 5 | 9th Destroyer Flotilla | Sheerness then Rosyth/Forth then Nore | May 1912 – 1914 | 1 cruiser leaders - 1-2 scout cruisers - approx 20 - 27 destroyers |
| 6 | 4th Submarine Flotilla | AOP | 1914-1918 | 7 boats |
| 7 | 5th Submarine Flotilla | AOP | 1914-1918 | 6 boats |
| 8 | 6th Submarine Flotilla | AOP | 1914-1918 | 6 boats |
| 9 | 7th Submarine Flotilla | AOP | 1914-1918 | 12 boats |
| 10 | 8th SubmarineFlotilla | AOP | 1914-1918 | 13 boats |
| 11 | 9th Submarine Flotilla | AOP | 1914-1918 | 3 boats |
| 12 | Auxiliary Patrol | multiple bases | 1914-1917 | Auxiliary Patrol Areas I - XXIII (Home Waters) and Auxiliary Patrol Area 1, 5, 8, 10 Mediterranean Sea |

== Units ==
flotilla vessels 1914
| Type | Number of units |
| Sentinel-class cruiser | 2 |
| Pathfinder-class cruiser | 1 |
| F Class DD | 12 |
| Old Destroyers | 62 |
| Torpedo boats | 24 |
| Other | 8 |
| Total | 109 |

flotilla vessels 1915
| Type | Number of units |
| Sentinel-class cruiser | 2 |
| Pathfinder-class cruiser | 1 |
| F Class DD | 8 |
| Old Destroyers | 45 |
| Torpedo boats | 18 |
| Other | 14 |
| Total | 80 |

== Auxiliary patrol ==
The Auxiliary Patrol was a component force under the (ADMP) and composed of a large number of small craft tasked with minesweeping and anti-submarine patrols, initially around the British Isles, but later also in the Mediterranean. The Auxiliary Patrol was the front-line force in the defence of initially the British Isles, but later also the Mediterranean, against German mines and submarines.

== See also ==
- Dover Patrol
- Northern Patrol
- Royal Naval Patrol Service

== Attribution ==
Primary source for this article is by Harley Simon, Lovell Tony, (2017), Admiral of Patrols, dreadnoughtproject.org, http://www.dreadnoughtproject.org.

== Sources ==
- Lambert, Nicholas A. (1999). Sir John Fisher's Naval Revolution. Columbia, SC: University of South Carolina Press. ISBN 1570032777
- Smith, Gordon. (2015). "World War 1 Dispositions of Royal Navy ships". naval-history.net. Naval History.net.
