= Edward Heaton-Ellis =

British Royal Navy officer

Vice-Admiral Sir Edward Heaton-Ellis KBE CB MVO
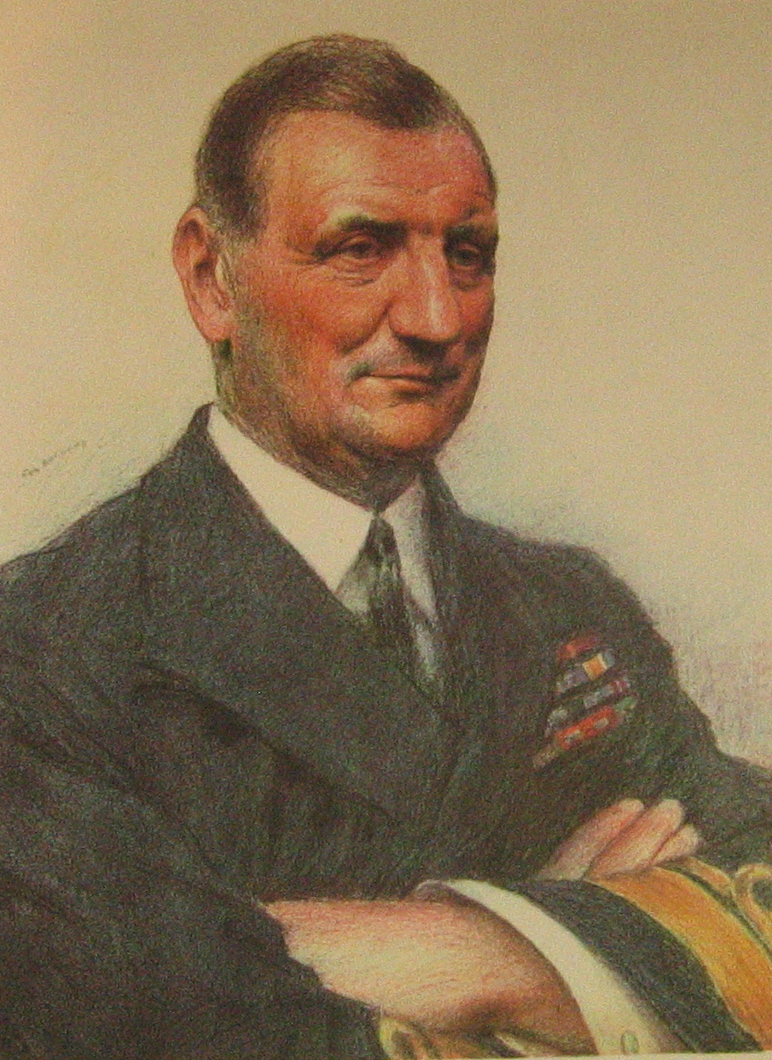
- Commodore Edward Heaton-Ellis, Paris, 1918. Pastel by Eugène Burnand
- Born: 19 November 1868
- Died: 23 February 1943 (aged 74)
- Military career
- Allegiance: United Kingdom
- Branch: Royal Navy
- Service years: 1882–1919
- Rank: Vice-Admiral
- Commands: HMS Sentinel
- Conflicts: World War I
- Awards: Knight Commander of the Order of the British Empire; Companion of the Order of the Bath; Member of the Royal Victorian Order

Vice-Admiral Sir Edward Henry Fitzhardinge Heaton-Ellis, KBE, CB, MVO (19 November 1868 – 23 February 1943) was a British Royal Navy officer.

== Naval career ==
Heaton-Ellis was born in Wyddial, Hertfordshire, to Edward Henry Brabazon Heaton-Ellis and Louisa Harriott Kingscote (20 July 1839 – 17 October 1874). He joined HMS Britannia as a Naval Cadet in 1882. In 1884 he was promoted midshipman and joined the composite screw corvette HMS Opal on the Cape of Good Hope and West Africa Station. He was commissioned sub-lieutenant in 1889 and promoted lieutenant in 1892. In 1897 he took command of HMS Hardy, one of the first destroyers, at Portsmouth. Five years later, he was on 1 July 1902 posted as first lieutenant on the pre-dreadnought battleship HMS Resolution, serving in the Channel Fleet. He was promoted to commander on 31 December 1902.

In 1905 he took command of the scout cruiser HMS Sentinel in the Mediterranean. While there he escorted HMY Victoria and Albert during King Edward VII's visit to Malta and was appointed Member of the Royal Victorian Order (MVO). In 1907 he was appointed naval attaché in Paris, and later served in the same capacity in Madrid, Lisbon and Brussels until 1911. He was promoted captain in 1908.

In February 1914 he became assistant director of the Naval Intelligence Division at the Admiralty in London. In April 1915 he took command of the battlecruiser HMS Inflexible. At the Battle of Jutland in 1916 the 3rd Battlecruiser Squadron flagship, HMS Invincible, was hit and blew up, but Heaton-Ellis led the squadron forward past the wreck of the flagship so brazenly that the Germans thought the Inflexible must be the leading ship of the British battle fleet and swerved away. For these services he was appointed Companion of the Order of the Bath (CB).

In November 1916, Heaton-Ellis was appointed chief of staff to Rear-Admiral Sir William Pakenham, commanding the Battlecruiser Squadron, in HMS Lion. In August 1917 he was appointed Naval Liaison Officer in Paris with the rank of commodore. He was promoted rear-admiral in October 1919 and retired a few months later, although he was promoted vice-admiral on the retired list in 1925.

Heaton-Ellis was appointed Commander of the Order of the British Empire (CBE) in 1919 and Knight Commander of the Order of the British Empire (KBE) in the 1920 New Year Honours.

He was president of the Navigators' and Engineer Officers' Union from 1937 and superintendent of the Watts Naval School in Norfolk from 1939 to 1941.

Both of his sons were killed in the First World War.
