= HMS Boadicea (1908) =

Boadicea class cruiser

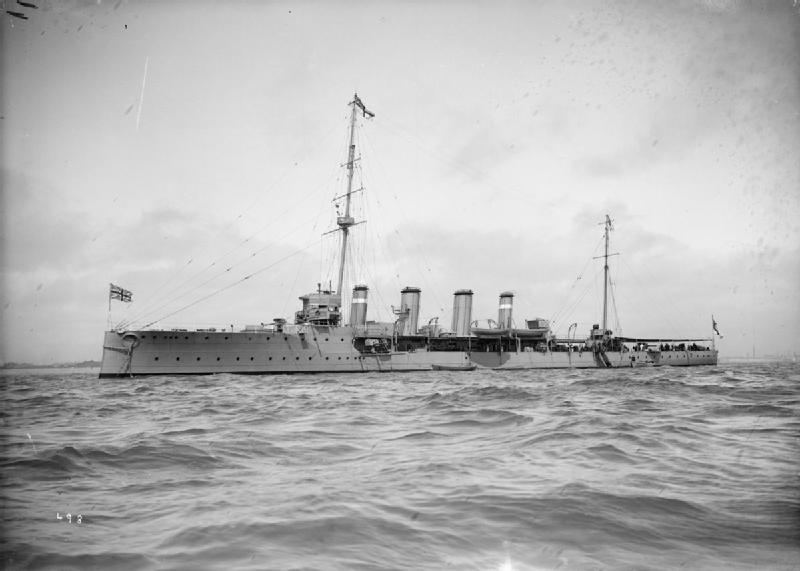
- Boadicea at anchor

History

United Kingdom
- Name: Boadicea
- Namesake: Boadicea
- Builder: Pembroke Royal Dockyard
- Laid down: 1 June 1907
- Launched: 14 May 1908
- Completed: June 1909
- Out of service: 18 February 1920
- Fate: Sold for scrap, 13 July 1926

General characteristics
- Class & type: Boadicea-class scout cruiser
- Displacement: 3,350 long tons (3,400 t) (normal)
- Length: 405 ft (123.4 m) (o/a)
- Beam: 41 ft 6 in (12.6 m)
- Draught: 14 ft (4.3 m)
- Installed power: 12 × Yarrow boilers; 18,000 shp (13,000 kW)
- Propulsion: 4 × shafts; 4 × Parsons steam turbines
- Speed: 25 knots (46 km/h; 29 mph)
- Complement: 317
- Armament: 6 × single BL 4 in (102 mm) guns; 4 × single QF 3-pdr 47 mm (1.9 in) guns; 2 × single 21 in (533 mm) torpedo tubes
- Armour: Deck: 0.5–1 in (13–25 mm); Conning tower: 4 in (102 mm)

HMS Boadicea was the lead ship of her class of scout cruisers built for the Royal Navy in the first decade of the 20th century. She led the 1st Destroyer Flotilla from completion until the ship was transferred to the 3rd Destroyer Flotilla in mid-1912. A year later Boadicea was reassigned to the 2nd Battle Squadron and she spent the bulk of World War I with that squadron. The ship was present at, but did not fight in, the Battle of Jutland in mid-1916. Boadicea was converted into a minelayer at the end of 1917 and made three sorties to lay her mines before the end of the war. She was placed in reserve after the war and taken out of service in 1920. The ship was used for harbour service at Dartmouth until she was sold for scrap in 1926.

== Design and description ==
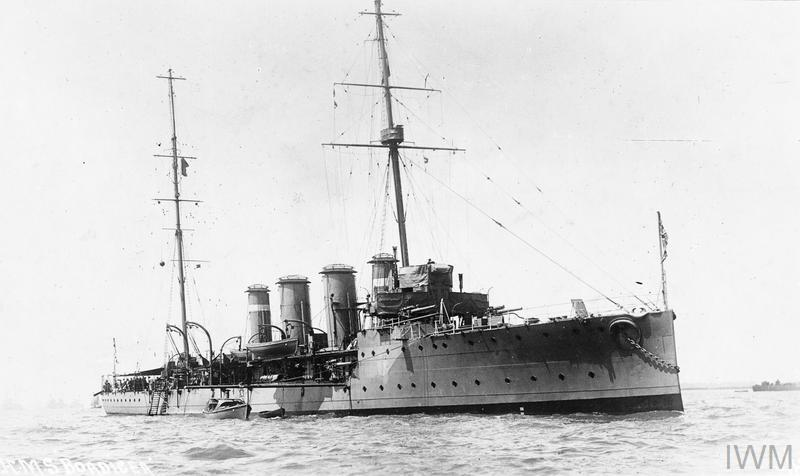
Boadicea

Designed to provide destroyer flotillas with a command ship capable of outclassing enemy destroyers with her six four-inch (102 mm) guns, Boadicea proved too slow in service from the start of her career. Her 25-knot (46 km/h; 29 mph) speed was barely capable of matching the speeds of the River-class destroyers she led in her flotilla in 1909 and proved inadequate to match the speed of later destroyers.

Displacing 3,350 long tons (3,400 t), the ship had an overall length of 405 feet (123.4 m), a beam of 41 feet 6 inches (12.6 m) and a deep draught of 14 feet (4.3 m). She was powered by two Parsons steam turbine sets, each driving two shafts. The turbines produced a total of 18,000 indicated horsepower (13,000 kW), using steam produced by 12 Yarrow boilers that burned both fuel oil and coal, and gave a maximum speed of 25 knots (46 km/h; 29 mph). She carried a maximum of 780 long tons (790 t) of coal and 189 long tons (192 t) of fuel oil. Her crew consisted of 317 officers and ratings.

Her main armament consisted of six breech-loading (BL) four-inch (102 mm) Mk VII guns. The forward pair of guns were mounted side by side on a platform on the forecastle, the middle pair were amidships, one on each broadside, and the two remaining guns were on the centreline of the quarterdeck, one ahead of the other. Her secondary armament was four quick-firing (QF) 3-pounder (47 mm (1.9 in)) Vickers Mk I guns and two submerged 21-inch (533 mm) torpedo tubes. During the war, four additional four-inch guns were added amidships to increase her firepower. A QF three-inch 20 cwt (Note: "Cwt" is the abbreviation for hundredweight, 20 cwt referring to the weight of the gun.) anti-aircraft gun was also added. In 1918 it was replaced by a four-inch gun.

As a scout cruiser, the ship was only lightly protected to maximise her speed. She had a curved protective deck that was one inch (25 mm) thick on the slope and 0.5 inches (13 mm) on the flat. Her conning tower was protected by four inches of armour.

== Construction and service ==
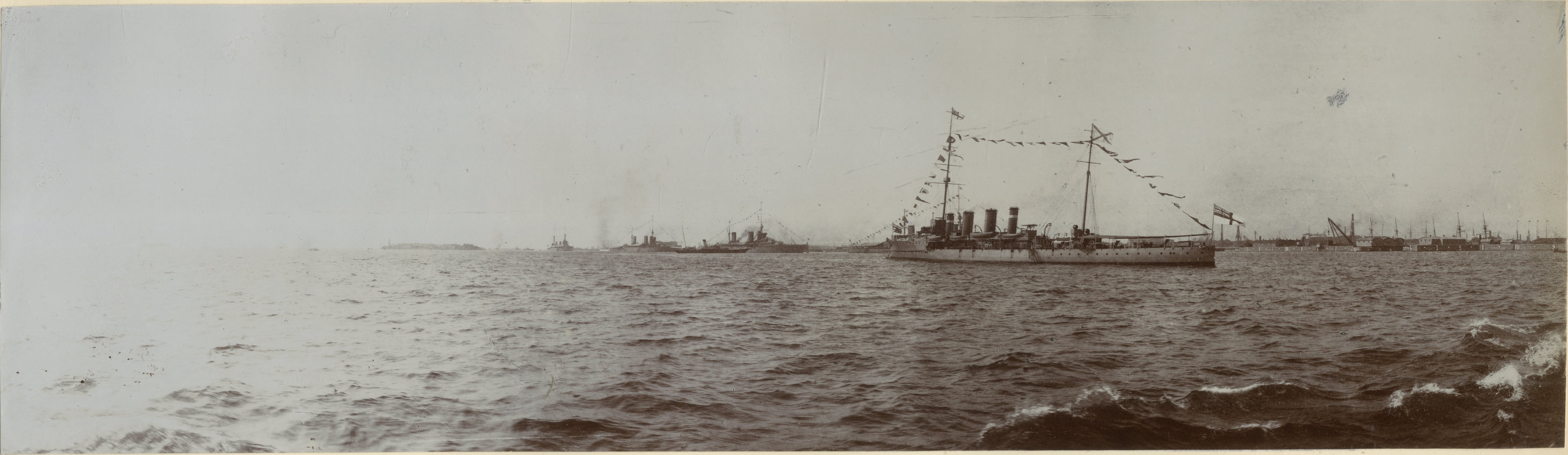
Boadicea in Kronstadt, Russia, in June 1914, while attached to the 1st Battlecruiser Squadron. A courtesy Russian Navy Ensign is raised on the mainmast

The fourth ship to bear her name in the Royal Navy, Boadicea was laid down at Pembroke Royal Dockyard on 1 June 1907 and launched on 14 May 1908 by Lady Kensington. She was the first turbine-powered cruiser in the Royal Navy and was completed in June 1909, under the temporary command of Commander Francis Leake. Captain Edward Charlton relieved Leake on 27 July and the ship became the flotilla leader of the 1st Destroyer Flotilla. Captain Vernon Haggard assumed command of the ship on 27 October 1911 and he was relieved by Captain Ernest Carey when the ship was transferred to the 3rd Destroyer Flotilla on 31 July 1912. Carey was only in command until 3 April 1913 when Captain Cecil Fox replaced him. Boadicea was transferred to the 2nd Battle Squadron on 5 July and Fox was relieved by Captain Louis Woollcombe. On 31 July 1914, she took Vice-Admiral John Jellicoe from Wick to Scapa Flow to assume command of the Grand Fleet.

She was assigned to the Second Battle Squadron of the Grand Fleet in Scapa Flow at the start of the war. On 15 December her bridge and several crewmen were lost overboard due to severe weather in the Pentland Firth as the squadron sortied to intercept German ships bombarding ports in Yorkshire. Boadicea had to return to port for repairs. She was at the Battle of Jutland on 31 May – 1 June 1916, but was assigned to a position at the rear of the squadron and did not fire her guns. She actually spotted the German fleet the night after the battle, but her report was not passed to Jellicoe for fear of giving away the position of the Grand Fleet. Woollcombe was relieved by Captain Algernon Candy on 8 September. The ship was relieved in the squadron by her sister ship Bellona in October 1917 and was on detached duties, probably in preparation for her conversion into a minelayer in December 1917. Boadicea was assigned to the 4th Battle Squadron in January 1918 and she laid mines at the entrance to the Kattegat on the nights of 18/19 and 24/25 February 1918, part of her total of 184 mines laid in three missions. The ship remained with the 4th Battle Squadron for the rest of the war.

After end of the war in November, the ship was relieved of her assignment with the 4th Battle Squadron and assigned to the Nore in February 1919 and placed in reserve there the following month. She was paid off on 18 February 1920 at Chatham Dockyard and was used for harbour service at Dartmouth until she was sold for scrap on 13 July 1926 to be broken up at Alloa, Rosyth.

== Bibliography ==
- Colledge, J. J.; Warlow, Ben (2006) [1969]. Ships of the Royal Navy: The Complete Record of All Fighting Ships of the Royal Navy from the 15th Century to the Present (3rd Rev ed.). London: Chatham Publishing. ISBN 978-1-86176-281-8. OCLC 67375475.
- Corbett, Julian (1997). Naval Operations. History of the Great War: Based on Official Documents. Vol. II (reprint of the 1929 second ed.). London and Nashville, Tennessee: Imperial War Museum in association with the Battery Press. ISBN 1-870423-74-7.
- Corbett, Julian (1997). Naval Operations. History of the Great War: Based on Official Documents. Vol. III (reprint of the 1940 second ed.). London and Nashville, Tennessee: Imperial War Museum in association with the Battery Press. ISBN 1-870423-50-X.
- Friedman, Norman (2009). British Destroyers From Earliest Days to the Second World War. Annapolis, Maryland: Naval Institute Press. ISBN 978-1-59114-081-8.
- Friedman, Norman (2011). Naval Weapons of World War One. Barnsley, South Yorkshire, UK: Seaforth. ISBN 978-1-84832-100-7.
- Goldrick, James (1984). The King's Ships Were at Sea: The War in the North Sea August 1914 – February 1915. Annapolis, Maryland: Naval Institute Press. ISBN 0-87021-334-2.
- Massie, Robert K. (2004). Castles of Steel: Britain, Germany, and the Winning of the Great War at Sea. London: Jonathan Cape. ISBN 0-224-04092-8.
- Phillips, Lawrie (2014). Pembroke Dockyard and the Old Navy: A Bicentennial History. Stroud, Gloucestershire, UK: The History Press. ISBN 978-0-7509-5214-9.
- Preston, Antony (1985). "Great Britain and Empire Forces". In Gardiner, Robert & Gray, Randal (eds.). Conway's All the World's Fighting Ships 1906–1921. Annapolis, Maryland: Naval Institute Press. pp. 1–104. ISBN 0-85177-245-5.
- Smith, Peter C. (2005). Into the Minefields: British Destroyer Minelaying 1916 – 1960. Barnsley, UK: Pen & Sword Maritime. ISBN 1-84415-271-5.
