= QF 4-inch naval gun Mk IV, XII, XXII =

Ordnance QF 4 inch gun Mk IV, XII, XXII
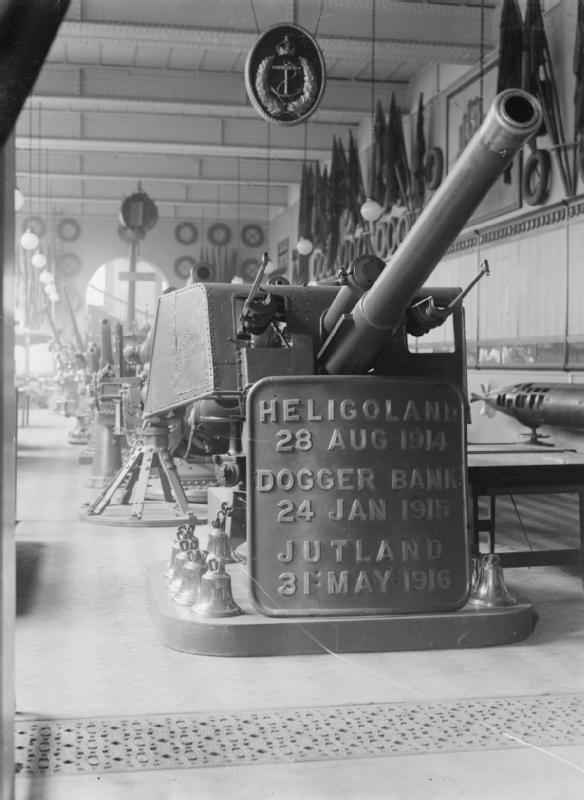
- Mk IV gun from HMS Lance at Imperial War Museum Naval Gallery in South Kensington, London 1926
- Type: Light Naval gun Submarine gun
- Place of origin: United Kingdom

Service history
- In service: 1911-1940s
- Used by: United Kingdom
- Wars: World War I World War II

Production history
- No. built: 1,141

Specifications
- Mass: 2,750 pounds (1,250 kg) barrel & breech
- Barrel length: 160 inches (4.064 m) bore (40 calibres)
- Shell: Mk IV: Separate QF; Mk XII & XXII: Fixed QF
- Shell weight: Mk IV: 31 pounds (14.06 kg); Mk XII & XXII: 31 pounds (14.06 kg), 35 pounds (15.88 kg) from 1944
- Calibre: 4-inch (101.6 mm)
- Breech: horizontal sliding-block
- Elevation: PIX Mount -10° to +20° CPIII Mount -10° to +30°
- Muzzle velocity: Mk IV : 2,370 feet per second (720 m/s); Mk XII & XXII : 1,873 feet per second (571 m/s)
- Maximum firing range: 11,580 yards (10,590 m) at +30°

The QF 4-inch gun Mk IV (Note: Mk IV = Mark 4. Britain used Roman numerals to denote Marks (models) of ordnance until after World War II. This was the fourth model of 4-inch QF naval gun. Variants Mk XII = Mark 12, Mk XXII = Mark 22.) was the main gun on most Royal Navy and British Empire destroyers in World War I. It was introduced in 1911 as a faster-loading light gun successor to the BL 4 inch Mk VIII gun. Of the 1,141 produced, 939 were still available in 1939. Mk XII and Mk XXII variants armed many British interwar and World War II submarines.

== Mk IV gun ==
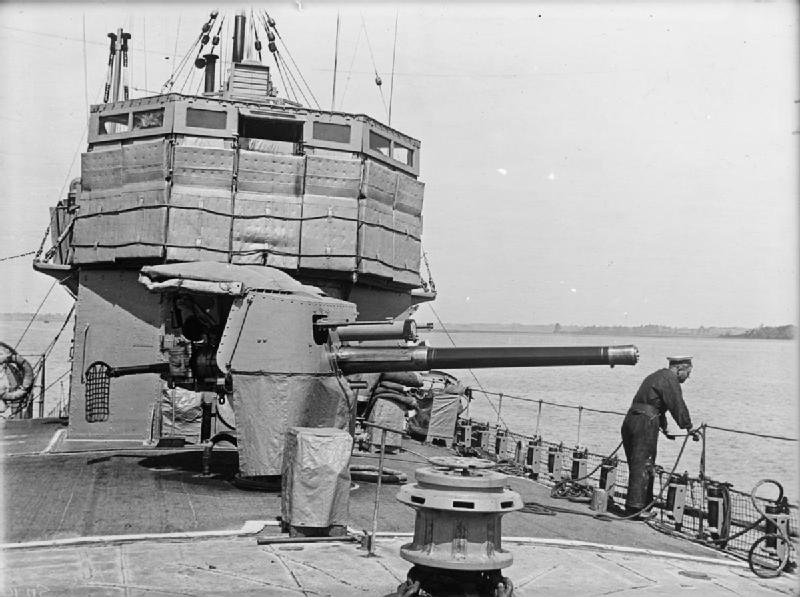
On R-class destroyer HMS Satyr c. 1917–1918

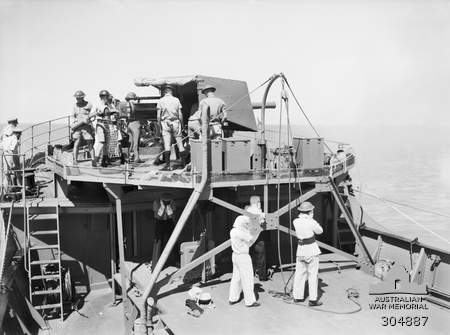
Gun recoiling after firing, on Australian auxiliary anti-submarine vessel HMAS Wilcannia c. 1943

Mk IV armed many British destroyers and some cruisers in World War I. It was used to arm merchant ships in World War II.

The guns armed the following warships :

- Forward-class scout cruisers as re-gunned in 1911
- Sentinel-class scout cruisers as re-gunned 1911-1912
- Pathfinder-class scout cruisers as re-gunned 1911-1912
- Adventure-class scout cruisers as re-gunned 1911-1912
- Acasta (K)-class destroyers of 1911
- Laforey (L)-class destroyers of 1913
- Yarrow M-class destroyers laid down 1912 - 1915
- Admiralty M-class destroyer of 1913
- Thornycroft M-class destroyers laid down 1913 - 1915
- Hawthorn M-class destroyer of 1914
- Talisman-class destroyers of 1914
- Medea-class destroyers of 1914
- Faulknor-class leaders of 1914
- Marksman-class destroyers of 1914
- Parker class leaders of 1915
- Yarrow Later M-class destroyers of 1915
- R-class destroyers of 1916
- S-class destroyers of 1917
- Fundy-class minesweepers of 1938 (guns from decommissioned Canadian S-class destroyers)
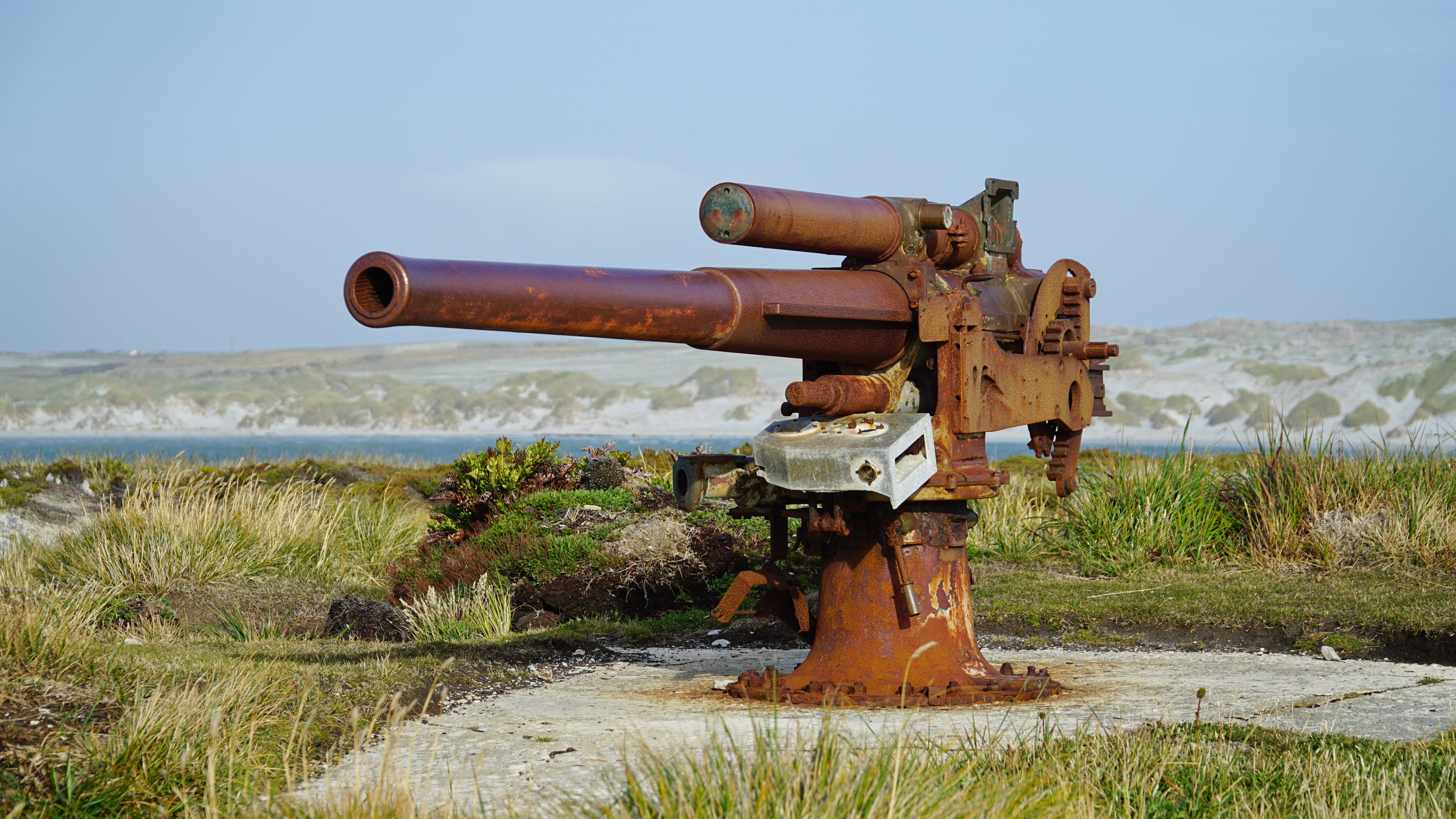
Rusted QF 4 inch mk IV gun without a gun shield on East Falkland

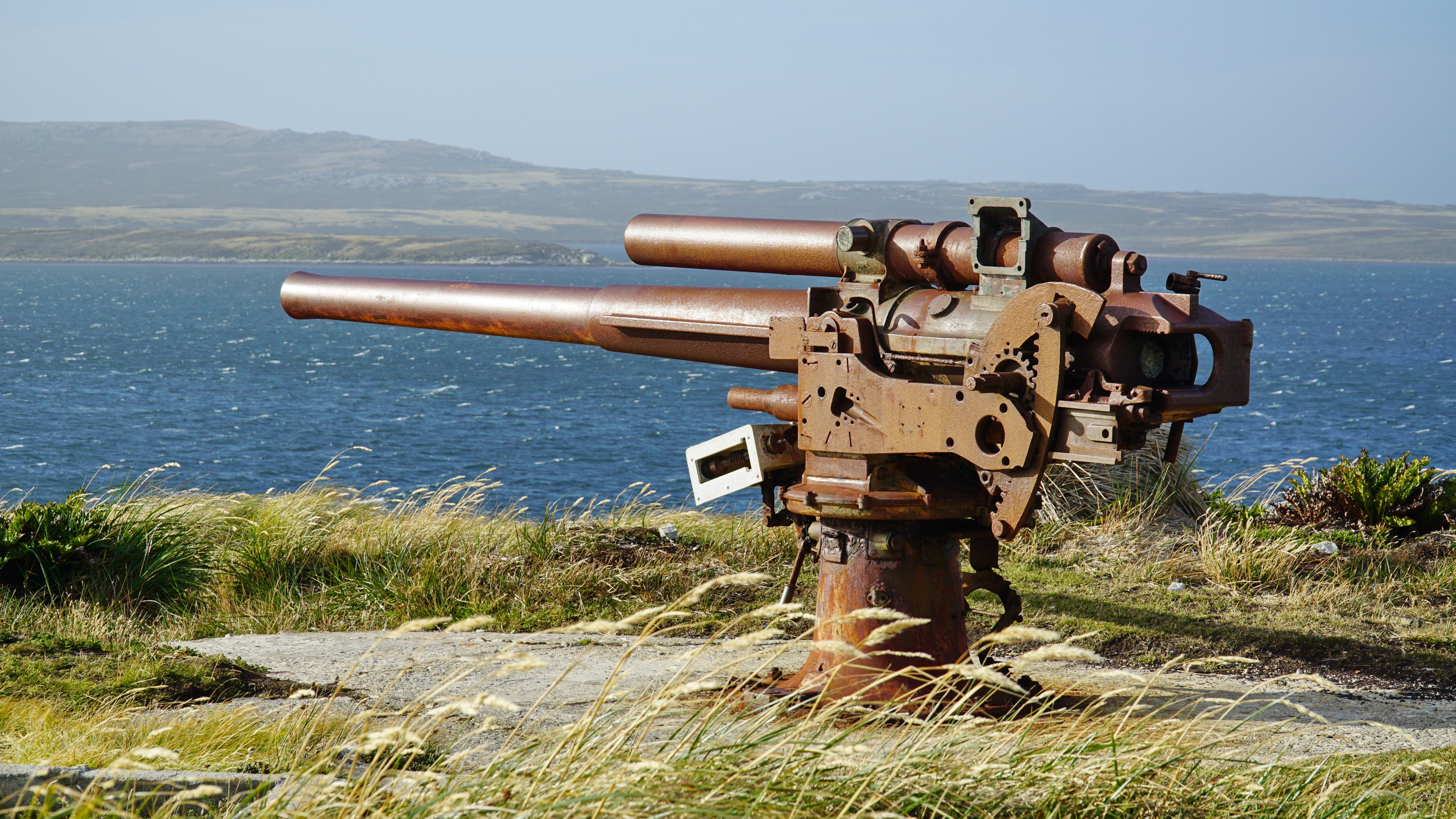
Back of rusted QF 4 inch mk IV gun without a gun shield

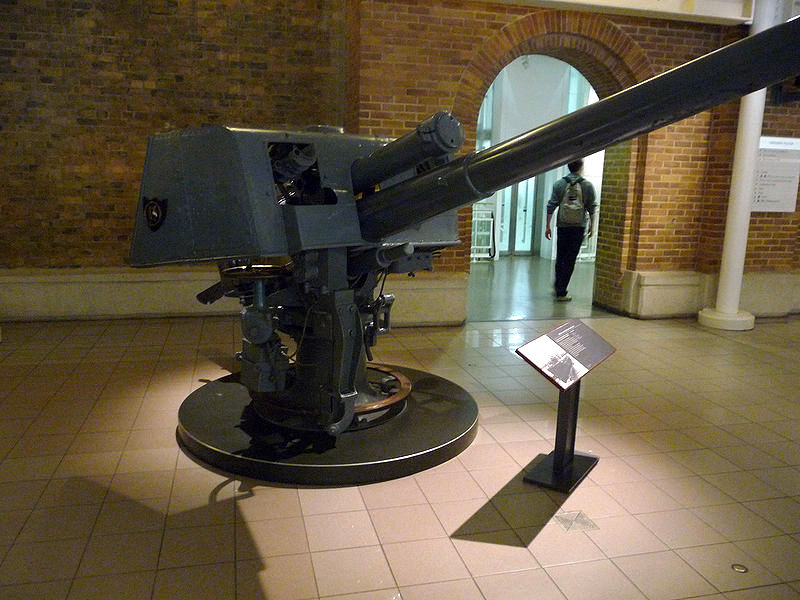
Front of QF 4 inch mk IV gun in Imperial War Museum

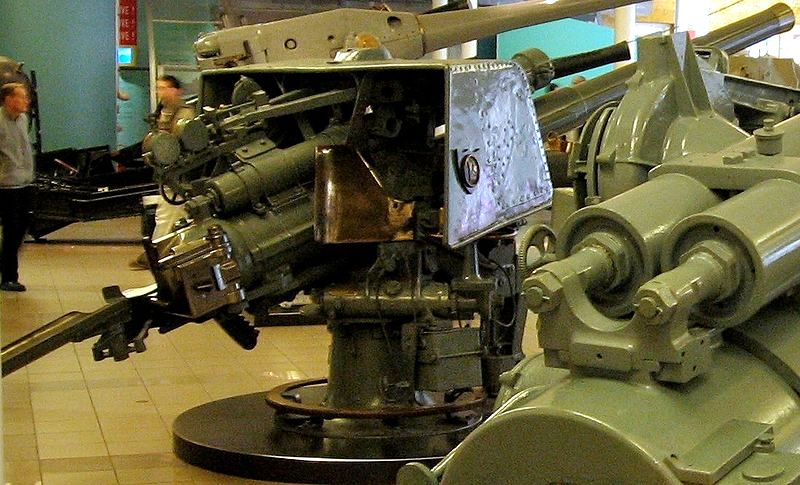
Back of QF 4 inch Mk IV gun at Imperial War Museum

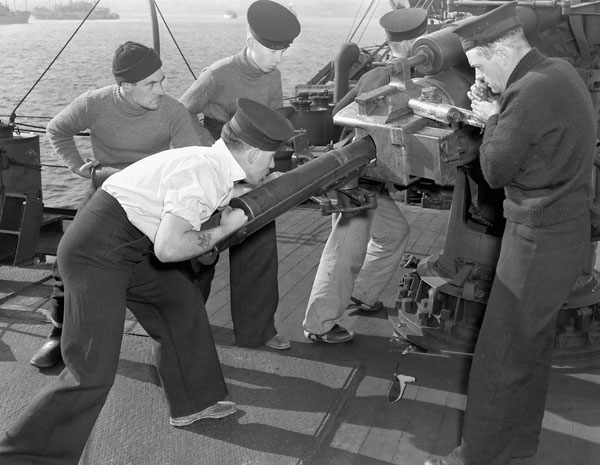
British sailors loading a QF 4 inch Mk IV gun in 1942

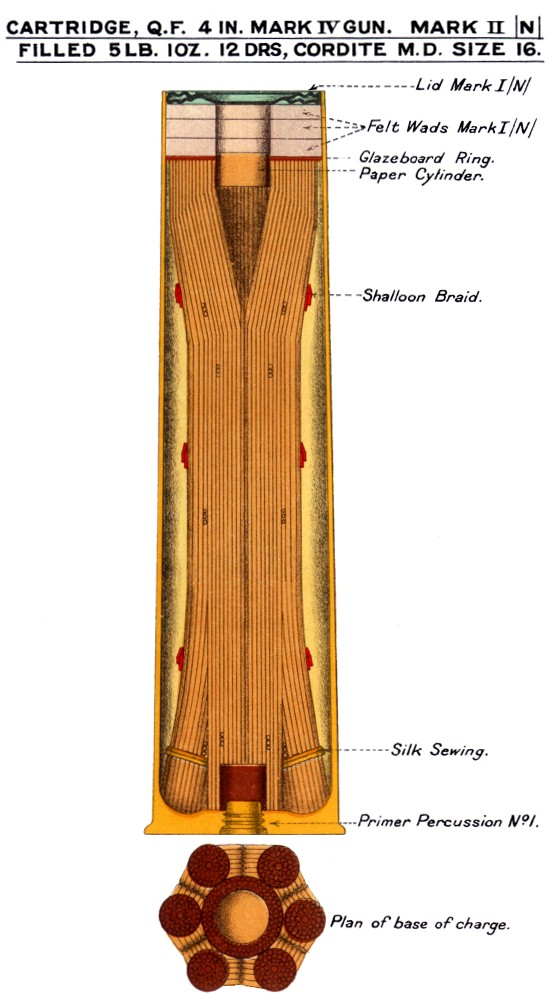
Diagram of a QF 4 inch Mk IV gun cartridge.

== Mk XII and XXII submarine gun ==
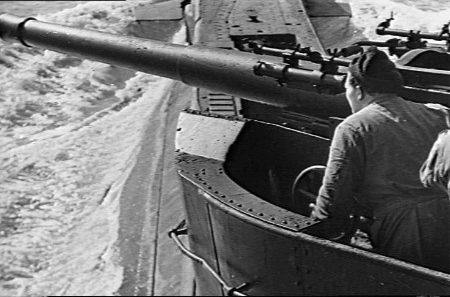
Mk XII gun on unidentified T-class submarine, during World War II

The Mk XII variant was developed for arming submarines from 1918, Mk XXII was developed to arm submarines during World War II. These submarine guns fired a heavier 35 pounds (16 kg) projectile from late 1944. Shortly after the end of hostilities, the Mk XXII was superseded in new British submarines by the lighter QF 4 inch Mk XXIII.

=== Mk XII and XXII equipped submarines ===
- L class
- Odin ("O") class
- Parthian ("P") class
- River (or Thames) class
- Grampus (or Porpoise) class
- Triton ("T") class
- S class
- Some of the Amphion ("A" or Acheron) class

== Surviving guns ==
- The Mk IV gun from HMS Lance which fired the first British shot of World War I on 5 August 1914 is on display at the National Museum of the Royal Navy, Portsmouth (on loan from the Imperial War Museum).
- A Mk IV gun on a 1945 Mk XVI mounting is on display at the Heugh Gun Battery Museum in Hartlepool, County Durham.
- A Mk IV gun on a pedestal mounting is still in situ at Ordnance Point in the Falkland Islands, where it is believed to have been installed in 1943.
- A First World War 4-inch naval gun, tentatively identified as a Mk IV, stands outside the Army, Navy and Air Force Veterans Hall in 4th Street, Sidney, British Columbia.
- Mark IV gun on display outside Port of Otago terminal building in New Zealand.

== See also ==
- List of naval guns

=== Weapons of comparable role, performance and era ===
- 10.5 cm SK L/45 naval gun : German WWI equivalent
- 10.5 cm SK C/32 naval gun : Slightly more powerful German equivalent WWII submarine gun
- 4"/50 caliber gun : US Navy equivalent

== Sources ==
- Tony DiGiulian, British 4"/40 (10.2 cm) QF Marks IV, XII and XXII
- Campbell, John (1985). Naval Weapons of World War Two. Annapolis, MD: Naval Institute Press. ISBN 0-87021-459-4.
