= Boadicea-class cruiser =

Class of British scout cruisers

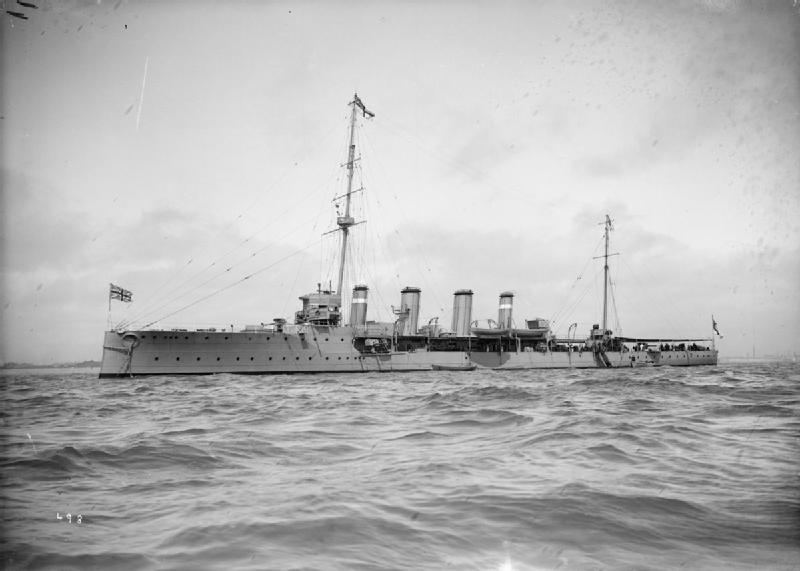
- Boadicea at anchor

Class overview
- Operators: Royal Navy
- Preceded by: Sentinel class
- Succeeded by: Blonde class
- Built: 1907–1910
- In commission: 1909–1926
- Completed: 2
- Scrapped: 2

General characteristics (as built)
- Type: Scout cruiser
- Displacement: 3,350 long tons (3,400 t) (normal)
- Length: 405 ft (123.4 m) (o/a)
- Beam: 41 ft 6 in (12.6 m)
- Draught: 14 ft (4.3 m)
- Installed power: 18,000 shp (13,000 kW); 12 × Yarrow boilers
- Propulsion: 4 × shafts; 2 × Parsons steam turbine sets
- Speed: 25 knots (46 km/h; 29 mph)
- Range: 4,260 nautical miles (7,890 km; 4,900 mi) at 10 knots (19 km/h; 12 mph)
- Complement: 317
- Armament: 6 × single BL 4-inch (102 mm) guns; 4 × single QF 3-pounder 47 mm (1.9 in) guns; 2 × single 21-inch (533 mm) torpedo tubes
- Armour: Deck: .5–1 in (13–25 mm); Conning Tower: 4 in (102 mm)

The Boadicea-class cruiser was a pair of scout cruisers built for the Royal Navy in the first decade of the 20th century. They were the first class of this type to be fitted with steam turbine machinery. Upon completion in 1909–10, the sister ships served as flotilla leaders for destroyer flotillas of the First Fleet until 1913 when they were assigned to battleship squadrons. When the First World War began in August 1914, they remained with their squadrons as the First Fleet was incorporated into the Grand Fleet, although they changed squadrons over the course of the war. Both ships were present during the Battle of Jutland in mid-1916, but neither fired a shot. They were converted into minelayers the following year and both ships laid minefields in early 1918 in addition to other missions. The sisters were reduced to reserve in 1919 and sold for scrap in 1921 and 1926.

== Design ==
Like the earlier scout cruisers, the Boadicea class was designed to provide destroyer flotillas with a command ship, theoretically offering the ability to scout ahead of the group and locate targets for the smaller ships to attack. They were enlarged and more powerfully armed versions of the earlier ships, fitted with steam turbines. They were no faster than the older ships and equally unsuccessful in their intended role as they lacked the speed of the destroyers they were supposed to escort.

Displacing 3,350 long tons (3,400 t), the ships had an overall length of 405 feet (123.4 m), a beam of 41 feet 6 inches (12.6 m) and a deep draught of 14 feet (4.3 m). They were powered by two sets of Parsons steam turbines, each driving two shafts. The turbines produced a total of 18,000 indicated horsepower (13,000 kW), using steam produced by 12 Yarrow boilers that burned both fuel oil and coal, and gave a maximum speed of 25 knots (46 km/h; 29 mph). They carried a maximum of 780 long tons (790 t) of coal and 189 long tons (192 t) of fuel oil that gave them a range of 4,260 nautical miles (7,890 km; 4,900 mi) at 10 knots (19 km/h; 12 mph). Her crew consisted of 317 officers and enlisted men.

The main armament of the Boadicea class consisted of six breech-loading (BL) four-inch (102 mm) Mk VII guns. The forward pair of guns were mounted side by side on a platform on the forecastle, the middle pair were amidships, one on each broadside, and the two remaining guns were on the centreline of the quarterdeck, one ahead of the other. The guns fired their 31-pound (14 kg) shells to a range of about 11,400 yards (10,400 m). Her secondary armament was four quick-firing (QF) three-pounder 47 mm (1.9 in) Vickers Mk I guns and two submerged 21-inch (533 mm) torpedo tubes. During the war, four additional four-inch guns were added amidships to increase her firepower. A QF three-inch 20 cwt (Note: "Cwt" is the abbreviation for hundredweight, 20 cwt referring to the weight of the gun.) anti-aircraft gun was also added. In 1918 it was replaced by a four-inch gun.

As scout cruisers, the ships were only lightly protected to maximise their speed. They had a curved protective deck that was 1 inch (25 mm) thick on the slope and 0.5 inches (13 mm) on the flat. Their conning tower was protected by 4 inches of armour.

== Ships ==
Construction data
Ship	Builder	Laid down	Launched	Completed
HMS Boadicea	Pembroke Dockyard	1 June 1907	14 May 1908	June 1909
HMS Bellona	Pembroke Dockyard	5 June 1908	23 March 1909	February 1910

== Service ==
Both Boadicea and Bellona began their careers with destroyer flotillas of the First Fleet, Boadicea as senior officers' ship for the 1st Destroyer Flotilla and Bellona with the 2nd Destroyer Flotilla. The former was transferred to the 3rd Destroyer Flotilla in mid-1912 and the sisters were transferred to the 2nd and the 1st Battle Squadrons, respectively, of the First Fleet in 1913. Both ships were assigned to positions at the rear of their squadrons and did not fire their guns during the Battle of Jutland on 31 May – 1 June 1916.

The sisters remained with their squadrons until 1917 when they were converted into minelayers, Bellona in May and Boadicea in October, Bellona replacing her sister in the 2nd Battle Squadron that month. After her conversion, Boadicea was assigned to the 4th Battle Squadron in January 1918 and neither ship was reassigned before the end of the war. They laid mines at the entrance to the Kattegat on the nights of 18/19 and 24/25 February 1918 and both made several other sorties to lay their mines before the end of the war. They were placed in reserve after the war and taken out of service in 1920. Bellona was quickly sold for scrap in 1921, but Boadicea was not sold until 1926.

== Bibliography ==
- Colledge, J. J.; Warlow, Ben (2006) [1969]. Ships of the Royal Navy: The Complete Record of All Fighting Ships of the Royal Navy from the 15th Century to the Present (3rd Rev ed.). London: Chatham Publishing. ISBN 978-1-86176-281-8. OCLC 67375475.
- Corbett, Julian (1997). Naval Operations to the Battle of the Falklands. History of the Great War: Based on Official Documents. Vol. I (2nd, reprint of the 1938 ed.). London and Nashville, Tennessee: Imperial War Museum and Battery Press. ISBN 0-89839-256-X.
- Friedman, Norman (2009). British Destroyers From Earliest Days to the Second World War. Annapolis, Maryland: Naval Institute Press. ISBN 978-1-59114-081-8.
- Friedman, Norman (2011). Naval Weapons of World War One. Barnsley, South Yorkshire, UK: Seaforth. ISBN 978-1-84832-100-7.
- Phillips, Lawrie (2014). Pembroke Dockyard and the Old Navy: A Bicentennial History. Stroud, Gloucestershire, UK: The History Press. ISBN 978-0-7509-5214-9.
- Preston, Antony (1985). "Great Britain and Empire Forces". In Gardiner, Robert & Gray, Randal (eds.). Conway's All the World's Fighting Ships 1906–1921. Annapolis, Maryland: Naval Institute Press. pp. 1–104. ISBN 0-85177-245-5.
- Smith, Peter C. (2005). Into the Minefields: British Destroyer Minelaying 1916 - 1960. Barnsley, UK: Pen & Sword Maritime. ISBN 1-84415-271-5.
