= HMS Bellona (1909) =

British Boadicea-class scout cruiser

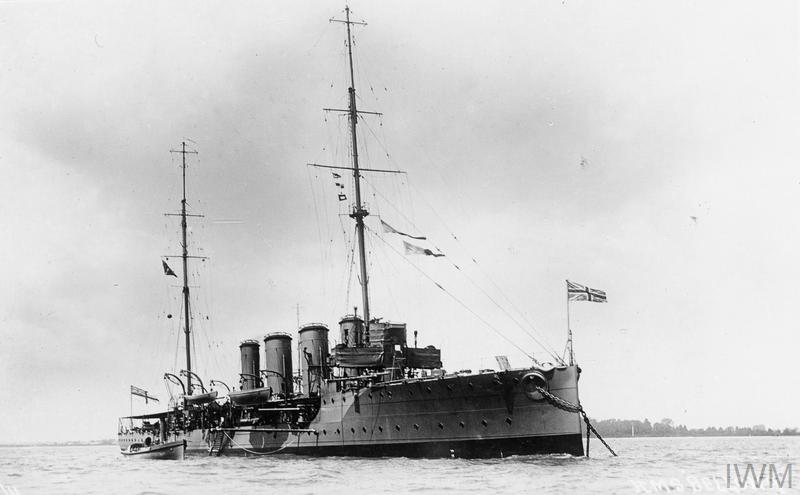
- Bellona at anchor

History

United Kingdom
- Name: Bellona
- Namesake: Bellona
- Builder: Pembroke Royal Dockyard
- Laid down: 5 June 1908
- Launched: 20 March 1909
- Completed: February 1910
- Decommissioned: 1919
- Fate: Sold for scrap, 9 May 1921

General characteristics
- Class & type: Boadicea-class scout cruiser
- Displacement: 3,350 long tons (3,400 t) (normal)
- Length: 405 ft (123.4 m) (o/a)
- Beam: 41 ft 6 in (12.6 m)
- Draught: 14 ft (4.3 m)
- Installed power: 12 × Yarrow boilers; 18,000 shp (13,000 kW)
- Propulsion: 4 × shafts; 2 × Parsons steam turbine sets
- Speed: 25 knots (46 km/h; 29 mph)
- Complement: 317
- Armament: 6 × single 4 in (102 mm) guns; 4 × single 3-pdr 47 mm (1.9 in) guns; 2 × single 21 in (533 mm) torpedo tubes
- Armour: Deck: 0.5–1 in (13–25 mm); Conning Tower: 4 in (102 mm)

HMS Bellona was one of two Boadicea-class scout cruisers built for the Royal Navy in the first decade of the 20th century. The ship served as the flotilla leader for the 2nd Destroyer Flotilla from her completion in 1910 until 1913 when she was transferred to the 1st Battle Squadron. Bellona spent the bulk of World War I with that squadron. She was present at, but did not fight in, the Battle of Jutland in mid-1916. The ship was converted into a minelayer in mid-1917 and made four sorties to lay her mines before the end of the war. Bellona was reduced to reserve in 1919 and sold to be broken up for scrap in 1921.

== Design and description ==
Designed to provide destroyer flotillas with a command ship, Bellona proved too slow in service from the start of her career. Her 25-knot (46 km/h; 29 mph) speed was barely capable of matching the speeds of the River-class destroyers she led in her flotilla in 1909 and proved inadequate to match the speed of later destroyers.

Displacing 3,350 long tons (3,400 t), the ship had an overall length of 405 feet (123.4 m), a beam of 41 feet 6 inches (12.6 m) and a deep draught of 14 feet (4.3 m). She was powered by two sets of Parsons steam turbines, each driving two shafts. The turbines produced a total of 18,000 indicated horsepower (13,000 kW), using steam produced by 12 Yarrow boilers that burned both fuel oil and coal, and gave a maximum speed of 25 knots (46 km/h; 29 mph). She carried a maximum of 780 long tons (790 t) of coal and 189 long tons (192 t) of fuel oil. Her crew consisted of 317 officers and ratings.

Her main armament consisted of six breech-loading (BL) four-inch (102 mm) Mk VII guns. The forward pair of guns were mounted side by side on a platform on the forecastle, the middle pair were amidships, one on each broadside, and the two remaining guns were on the centreline of the quarterdeck, one ahead of the other. Her secondary armament consisted of four quick-firing (QF) 3-pounder (47-millimetre (1.9 in)) Vickers Mk I guns and two submerged 21-inch (533 mm) torpedo tubes. During the war, four additional four-inch guns were added amidships to increase her firepower. A QF three-inch (76 mm) 20-cwt (Note: "Cwt" is the abbreviation for hundredweight, 20 cwt referring to the weight of the gun.) anti-aircraft gun was also added. In 1918 it was replaced by a four-inch gun.

As a scout cruiser, the ship was only lightly protected to maximise her speed. She had a curved protective deck that was 1 inch (25 mm) thick on the slope and 0.5 inches (13 mm) on the flat. Her conning tower was protected by four inches of armour.

== Construction and service ==
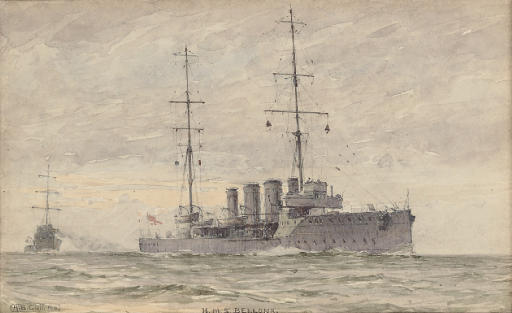
Bellona on exercise at sea in 1911, by A. B. Cull

Bellona, the sixth ship of that name, was ordered as part of the 1907 Naval Programme and was laid down on No. 5 Slipway at Pembroke Royal Dockyard on 15 June 1908 by Mrs. Kingsford, wife of the Captain-Superintendent of the dockyard, Rear-Admiral Henry Kingsford. The ship was launched on 20 March 1909 by Lady Leonora, wife of John Philips, Baron St Davids. She was completed in February 1910 under the command of Captain Edwyn Alexander-Sinclair, commander of the 2nd Destroyer Flotilla. He was relieved by Captain The Honourable Hubert Brand on 7 February 1911. Captain Reginald Tyrwhitt replaced him on 10 August 1912. The ship had been transferred to the 1st Battle Squadron as of 18 June 1913 and Captain Percy Royds assumed command on 5 July.

She was still assigned to the 1st Battle Squadron of the Grand Fleet in Scapa Flow at the start of World War I. On 17 December 1914, Bellona collided with the destroyer leader Broke, although both ships were seriously damaged, there were no deaths. Captain Arthur Dutton relieved Royds on 24 April 1916. Bellona was at the Battle of Jutland but was assigned to a position at the rear of the squadron and did not fire her guns. Dutton was relieved in his turn by Captain Claud Sinclair on 28 August and was replaced by Captain Ernest Denison on 1 February 1917. The ship was on detached duty by May, probably for her conversion to a minelayer the following month, and was briefly assigned to the 4th Battle Squadron by July before rejoining the 1st Battle Squadron in August. Bellona's stay was destined to short-lived as the ship was transferred to the 2nd Battle Squadron by October. Bellona laid mines at the entrance to the Kattegat on the nights of 18/19 and 24/25 February 1918, part of her total of 306 mines laid in four missions. Captain Theodore Bigg relieved Denison on 15 November. After the war, the ship was relieved of her assignment with the 2nd Battle Squadron and assigned to Devonport Dockyard in February 1919 and placed in reserve there the following month. By 18 December, she had been listed for sale and sold for scrap on 9 May 1921 to Thos. W. Ward at Lelant.

== Bibliography ==
- Colledge, J. J.; Warlow, Ben (2006) [1969]. Ships of the Royal Navy: The Complete Record of All Fighting Ships of the Royal Navy from the 15th Century to the Present (3rd Rev ed.). London: Chatham Publishing. ISBN 978-1-86176-281-8. OCLC 67375475.
- Corbett, Julian (March 1997). Naval Operations to the Battle of the Falklands. History of the Great War: Based on Official Documents. Vol. I (2nd, reprint of the 1938 ed.). London and Nashville, Tennessee: Imperial War Museum and Battery Press. ISBN 0-89839-256-X.
- Corbett, Julian (1997). Naval Operations. History of the Great War: Based on Official Documents. Vol. II (reprint of the 1929 second ed.). London and Nashville, Tennessee: Imperial War Museum in association with the Battery Press. ISBN 1-870423-74-7.
- Corbett, Julian (1997). Naval Operations. History of the Great War: Based on Official Documents. Vol. III (reprint of the 1940 second ed.). London and Nashville, Tennessee: Imperial War Museum in association with the Battery Press. ISBN 1-870423-50-X.
- Friedman, Norman (2009). British Destroyers From Earliest Days to the Second World War. Annapolis, Maryland: Naval Institute Press. ISBN 978-1-59114-081-8.
- Friedman, Norman (2011). Naval Weapons of World War One. Barnsley, South Yorkshire, UK: Seaforth. ISBN 978-1-84832-100-7.
- Preston, Antony (1985). "Great Britain and Empire Forces". In Gardiner, Robert & Gray, Randal (eds.). Conway's All the World's Fighting Ships 1906–1921. Annapolis, Maryland: Naval Institute Press. pp. 1–104. ISBN 0-85177-245-5.
- Jellicoe, John (1919). The Grand Fleet 1914–1916: Its Creation, Development and Work. London: Cassell and Company.
- Phillips, Lawrie (2014). Pembroke Dockyard and the Old Navy: A Bicentennial History. Stroud, Gloucestershire, UK: The History Press. ISBN 978-0-7509-5214-9.
- Smith, Peter C. (2005). Into the Minefields: British Destroyer Minelaying 1916 - 1960. Barnsley, UK: Pen & Sword Maritime. ISBN 1-84415-271-5.
