= Archibald Cochrane (Royal Navy officer, born 1874) =

British naval officer (1874–1952)

Rear-Admiral Archibald Cochrane CMG
- Portrait by Walter Stoneman, 1918
- Born: 20 June 1874
- Died: 15 July 1952 (aged 78); Windlesham, Surrey, England
- Spouse: Maye de V. Brooke (m. 1904)
- Children: 4
- Military career
- Allegiance: United Kingdom
- Branch: Royal Navy
- Service years: 1888–1929
- Rank: Rear-Admiral
- Commands: HMS Speedwell; HMS Alacrity; RMS Empress of Russia; HMS Sentinel; HMS Skirmisher
- Conflicts: World War I
- Awards: Order of St Michael and St George, 1918; Order of the Redeemer; Légion d'honneur

Rear-Admiral Archibald Cochrane, CMG (20 June 1874 – 15 July 1952) was a British Royal Navy officer.

== Biography ==
Cochrane was born on 20 June 1874 and was the eldest son of Vice Admiral Basil E. Cochrane. His family had a tradition of naval service and among them was the similarly named Archibald Cochrane (1783–1829).

Educated at prep school Woodcote House School in Windlesham, Surrey and then at Eastman's Royal Naval Academy, Stubbington House School and HMS Britannia, Cochrane joined the Royal Navy in 1888 and went to sea in 1890. He was promoted to sub-lieutenant in 1894 and to lieutenant in 1896. While holding that rank and stationed on HMS Anson in 1897, he was given charge of an operation involving a landing on Crete. In February 1900, he was posted to the pre-dreadnought battleship HMS Ocean, which was stationed at the Mediterranean Fleet for its first commission. He temporarily received gunnery duties on board the Ocean from January 1903, then served as flag lieutenant to Rear Admiral Harry Tremenheere Grenfell, second-in-command on the China station, flagship HMS Albion, but later that year was posted to HMS Glory.

Cochrane then became Flag Lieutenant to Vice-Admiral Sir H. Grenfell in the Mediterranean Squadron and in 1906 took command of HMS Speedwell in the Home Fleet. He was promoted to commander in 1908 and was commanding HMS Alacrity in China at the start of World War I. He took command of HMS Empress of Russia, an armed Canadian Pacific steamships liner, during 1914–15 and then was posted to the Aegean Squadron in command of HMS Sentinel until June 1916. Staying with that squadron, which formed part of the Eastern Mediterranean Fleet, he commanded HMS Skirmisher until September 1918. He was promoted to captain in that year.

Following the war, Cochrane stayed in the navy, completing 41 years of service before retiring in 1929. He was promoted to rear-admiral in his final year of service, during which he also acted as ADC to George V. He had married Maye, only daughter of Colonel A. de V. Brooke, in 1904 and the couple had four daughters. He died at his home in Windlesham on 15 July 1952.

Cochrane was invested as a Companion of the Order of St Michael and St George in 1918 and was also honoured with appointment to the Order of the Redeemer of Greece and as a Chevalier de la Légion d’honneur.
