= Admiral Cochrane =

Admiral Cochrane may refer to:

- Alexander Cochrane (1758–1832), British Royal Navy admiral
- Archibald Cochrane (Royal Navy officer, born 1874) (1874–1952), British Royal Navy rear admiral
- Arthur Cochrane (Royal Navy officer) (1824–1905), British Royal Navy admiral
- Edward L. Cochrane (1892–1959), U.S. Navy vice admiral
- Nathaniel Day Cochrane (1780–1844), British Royal Navy rear admiral
- Thomas Cochrane, 10th Earl of Dundonald (1775–1860), British Royal Navy admiral
- Thomas John Cochrane (1789–1872), British Royal Navy admiral
