= Auxiliary Patrol =

- Active: 1914–1919
- Country: United Kingdom
- Branch: Royal Navy
- Type: Fleet

Commanders
- Notable commanders: Rear-Admiral John de Robeck

The Auxiliary Patrol was an antisubmarine patrols initiative by the British to help combat German submarine operations in the early stages of World War I. It was under the command of the Admiral of Patrols at the Admiralty and was the pioneer of anti-submarine warfare.

== History ==
On May 1, 1912 the post of Admiral of Patrols was established responsible for five destroyer flotillas covering waters around the British Isles. In 1914, the Board of Admiralty sent an order the Admiralty War Staff to re-evaluate the functional role the patrol flotillas off the Eastern Coast of Britain the First Sea Lord indicated that the current function of patrolling would now be that of coastal defence. After the implementation took place Rear Admiral John de Robeck was then replaced as ADMOP by a new commander Commodore George A. Ballard. He assumed the duties of Admiral of Patrols on the 1 May 1914 the auxiliary patrol was then a component part of the Admiral of Patrols command until 1917.

The majority of British trawlers were commandeered by the Admiralty, and those left were obliged to fish in groups of 20 with additional protection.

The Auxiliary Patrol was crewed by fishermen and led mainly by Merchant Navy men commissioned into the Royal Naval Reserve. They operated as trawlers do, in all weathers. Their trawlers were armed, typically with 3-pounder, 6-pounder or 12-pounder guns as well as 7.5-inch Bomb Throwers (Anti Submarine howitzers). Specialist crew such as signallers and gunners were also put on board. Later in the war the Admiralty built three classes of larger trawlers as well as developing a new special class of minesweeper. By the Second World War, the Royal Navy had formed a specialist minesweeping force and the Royal Naval Patrol Service was formed, known to many as "Harry Tate's Navy".

== Patrol areas Home waters ==
In 1914 new patrol areas were designated "Auxiliary" that covered UK waters.

=== Areas allocated by number ===
- Auxiliary Patrol Areas I—Stornoway
- Auxiliary Patrol Areas II—Shetlands
- Auxiliary Patrol Areas III—Orkneys
- Auxiliary Patrol Area IV—Cromarty, Moray Firth
- Auxiliary Patrol, Area V—Peterhead
- Auxiliary Patrol Area VI—Granton
- Auxiliary Patrol Area VII—Granton
- Auxiliary Patrol Area VIII—Tyne
- Auxiliary Patrol Area IX—Humber
- Auxiliary Patrol Area X— Great Yarmouth, Harwich local area, Nore local area
- Auxiliary Patrol Area XI—Dover and the Downs
- Auxiliary Patrol Area XII—Portsmouth
- Auxiliary Patrol Area XIII—Portland
- Auxiliary Patrol Area XIV—Plymouth, Falmouth, Bristol Channel area
- Auxiliary Patrol Area XV—Milford Haven
- Auxiliary Patrol Area XVI—Kingston, Liverpool local area
- Auxiliary Patrol Area XVII—Lough Lame, Clyde local area–(North Coast of Ireland)
- Auxiliary Patrol Area XVIII—Lough Swilly
- Auxiliary Patrol Area XIX—Killybegs
- Auxiliary Patrol Area XX—Galway Bay
- Auxiliary Patrol Area XXI—Queenstown
- Auxiliary Patrol Area XXII—Holyhead
- Auxiliary Patrol Area XXIII–(?)

=== Areas allocated by name ===
- Nore Auxiliary Patrol Area–(covering east of London and the mouth of the Nore)
- Harwich Auxiliary Patrol Area–(covering north of the Nore and off the coast of Harwich)
- Bristol Auxiliary Patrol Area–(covering the Bristol Channel)
- Mersey Auxiliary Patrol Area–(covering off mouth of the river Mersey)
- Clyde Auxiliary Patrol Area–(covering the mouth of the river Clyde)

== Patrol areas Mediterranean Sea ==
The Mediterranean Sea was divided into patrol zones dividing responsibility between the British, French and Italian navies.

=== British areas ===
- Auxiliary Patrol Area 1 (Mediterranean west)
- Auxiliary Patrol Area 5 (Mediterranean central)
- Auxiliary Patrol Area 8 (Aegean sea)
- Auxiliary Patrol Area 10 (East Mediterranean south of Crete, to the coast of Egypt)

=== French areas ===
- Auxiliary Patrol Area 2 (Oran, east of and west of Sardinia and Corsica)
- Auxiliary Patrol Area 4 (Tunisia, eastern coast)
- Auxiliary Patrol Area 7 (Greece, Southwest)
- Auxiliary Patrol Area 9 (East Mediterranean)

=== Italian Areas ===
- Auxiliary Patrol Area 3, (Tyrrhenian Sea)
- Auxiliary Patrol Area 6, (Adriatic sea)
- Auxiliary Patrol Area 11, (Gulf of Sidra)

== See also ==
- Dover Patrol
- Northern Patrol
- Royal Naval Patrol Service
- Trawlers of the Royal Navy

== Sources ==
- Harley Simon, Lovell Tony, (2017), Admiral of Patrols, dreadnoughtproject.org, http://www.dreadnoughtproject.org.
