= Leone-class destroyer =

1920s class of Italian naval ships

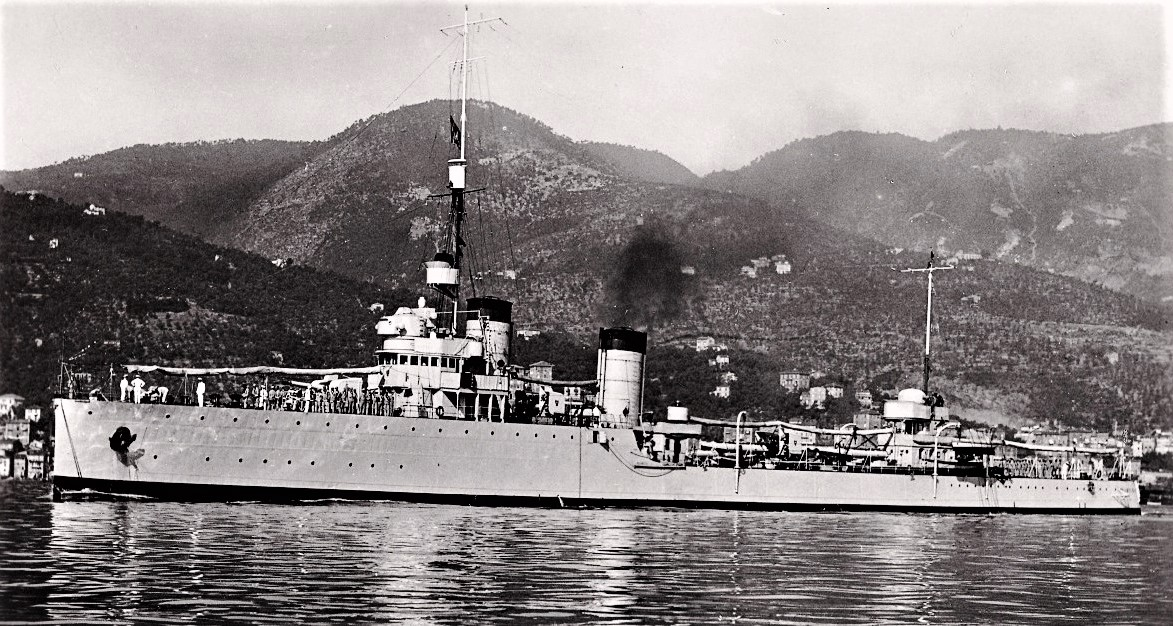
- Pantera

Class overview
- Builders: Ansaldo, Genoa
- Operators: Regia Marina
- Built: 1921–1924
- In commission: 1924–1941
- Planned: 5
- Completed: 3
- Canceled: 2
- Lost: 3

General characteristics (as built)
- Type: Destroyer
- Displacement: 2,195 long tons (2,230 t) (normal); 2,289 long tons (2,326 t) (full load)
- Length: 113.41 m (372 ft 1 in) (o/a)
- Beam: 10.36 m (34 ft)
- Draught: 3.1 m (10 ft 2 in) (mean)
- Installed power: 4 Yarrow boilers; 42,000 hp (31,000 kW)
- Propulsion: 2 shafts; 2 geared steam turbines
- Speed: 33 knots (61 km/h; 38 mph)
- Range: 2,000 nmi (3,700 km; 2,300 mi) at 15 knots (28 km/h; 17 mph)
- Complement: 10 officers and 194 enlisted men
- Armament: 4 × twin 120 mm (4.7 in) guns; 2 × single 76 mm (3 in) AA guns; 2 × triple 450 mm (17.7 in) torpedo tubes; 60 mines

The Leone class were a group of destroyers built for the Italian Navy in the early 1920s. Five ships were planned and three completed. All three ships were based at Massawa, Eritrea, during World War II and were sunk during the East African Campaign.

== Design and description ==
The ships were designed as scout cruisers (esploratori), essentially enlarged versions of contemporary destroyers. They were initially ordered in 1917, but postponed due to steel shortages, and re-ordered in 1920. They had an overall length of 113.41 meters (372 ft), a beam of 10.36 meters (34 ft) and a mean draft of 3.1 meters (10 ft 2 in). They displaced 2,195 long tons (2,230 t) at standard load, and 2,289 long tons (2,330 t) at deep load. Their complement was 10 officers and 194 enlisted men.

The Leones were powered by two Parsons geared steam turbines, each driving one propeller shaft using steam supplied by four Yarrow boilers. The turbines were rated at 42,000 shaft horsepower (31,000 kW) for a speed of 33 knots (61 km/h; 38 mph) in service, although all of the ships exceeded that speed during their sea trials. The ships carried 393 long tons (399 t) of fuel oil that gave them a range of 2,000 nautical miles (3,700 km; 2,300 mi) at a speed of 15 knots (28 km/h; 17 mph).

Their main battery consisted of eight 120-millimeter (4.7 in) guns in four twin-gun turrets, one each fore and aft of the superstructure and the remaining turrets positioned between the funnels and the torpedo tube mounts amidships. Anti-aircraft (AA) defense for the Leone-class ships was provided by a pair of 76 mm (3 in) AA guns in single mounts amidships. They were equipped with six 450-millimeter (17.7 in) torpedo tubes in two triple mounts. The Leones could also carry 60 mines.

== Operational history ==
The ships were outfitted for colonial service, and by 1935 they were deployed in the naval base of Massawa, Eritrea. The ships were re-rated as destroyers in 1938 and fought in World War II, when the Italian entry in the war left Italian East Africa isolated from Italy.

=== Attack on convoy BN 7 ===
The lead ship of the class, Leone

The only appreciable action in which the destroyers were involved was the attack on the Allied convoy BN 7, in the early hours of 21 October 1940. Leone and Pantera, along with the Sauro-class destroyers Francesco Nullo and Nazario Sauro, shelled the convoy and its escort, inflicting some splinter damage to the leading ship, the tanker British Colonel, especially on one of her lifeboats, and launched at least two torpedoes aimed at HMAS Yarra, which dodged them. The lifeboat caught fire and exploded; the tanker remained in Suez for repairs until 17 April 1941. The attack was nevertheless repulsed by the cruiser HMS Leander, which fired 129 six-inch rounds on the Italian destroyers. Leone, Pantera and Sauro successfully disengaged but Nullo was chased by HMS Kimberley and forced to run aground on Harmil island, where she was later wrecked by RAF Blenheim bombers. Kimberley took two hits on a boiler from coastal batteries, and had to be towed to Aden by HMS Leander.

=== Last mission ===
The destroyers remained at dock in Massawa until the very end of ground operations in East Africa. Their commander ordered them to steam out on 31 March 1941, for a naval bombardment against targets around the Suez Canal, in a mission without return. Leone ran aground off Massawa, and was then destroyed by her sister ships. After being spotted and harassed by British aircraft, Pantera and Tigre reached the Arabian shores, where their crews scuttled them.

== Ships ==
Construction data
Ship	Laid down	Launched	Completed	Fate
Leone	23 November 1921	1 October 1923	1 July 1924	Wrecked on uncharted rock 1 April 1941
Pantera	19 December 1921	18 October 1923	28 October 1924	Scuttled 3/4 April 1941
Tigre	23 January 1922	7 August 1924	10 October 1924	Scuttled 3/4 April 1941

Two more ships Lince and Leopardo were cancelled in 1920 or 1921.

== Bibliography ==
- Brescia, Maurizio (2012). Mussolini's Navy: A Reference Guide to the Regina Marina 1930–45. Annapolis, Maryland: Naval Institute Press. ISBN 978-1-59114-544-8.
- Campbell, John (1985). Naval Weapons of World War Two. Annapolis, Maryland: Naval Institute Press. ISBN 0-87021-459-4.
- Fraccaroli, Aldo (1968). Italian Warships of World War II. Shepperton, UK: Ian Allan. ISBN 0-7110-0002-6.
- Gray, Randal, ed. (1985). Conway's All the World's Fighting Ships 1906–1921. Annapolis, Maryland: Naval Institute Press. ISBN 978-0-87021-907-8.
- O'Hara, Vincent P. (2009). Struggle for the Middle Sea: The Great Navies at War in the Mediterranean Theater, 1940–1945. Annapolis, Maryland: Naval Institute Press. ISBN 978-1-59114-648-3.
- Roberts, John (1980). "Italy". In Chesneau, Roger (ed.). Conway's All the World's Fighting Ships 1922–1946. New York: Mayflower Books. pp. 280–317. ISBN 0-8317-0303-2.
- Rohwer, Jürgen (2005). Chronology of the War at Sea 1939–1945: The Naval History of World War Two (Third Revised ed.). Annapolis, Maryland: Naval Institute Press. ISBN 1-59114-119-2.
- Whitley, M. J. (1988). Destroyers of World War 2: An International Encyclopedia. Annapolis, Maryland: Naval Institute Press. ISBN 1-85409-521-8.
