= Flotilla leader =

Warship suitable for commanding a flotilla of destroyers or other small warships

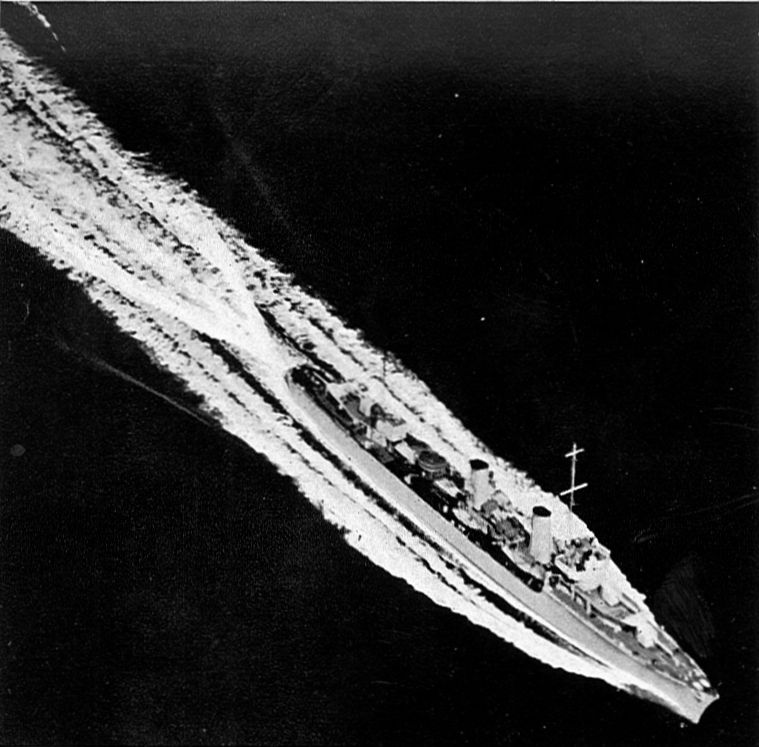
Dubrovnik, a large destroyer design built as a flotilla leader

A flotilla leader was a small warship, especially prominent in early 20th century navies, suitable for commanding a flotilla of destroyers or other small warships, typically a small cruiser or a large destroyer. The flotilla leader provided space, equipment and staff for the flotilla commodore (who typically held the rank of captain), including a wireless room, senior engineering and gunnery officers, and administrative staff to support the officers. Originally, the fastest light or scout cruisers available were often used, often having been specially designed for the role.

For example, in the Royal Navy, torpedo boat flotillas and even the first TBD flotillas had no specific type assigned to leader duties from their establishment, even with the advent of small specialist 'torpedo cruisers' (which had been conceived primarily as independent attack vessels in their own right, with doctrine very vague and largely down to enterprising younger officers in the torpedo branch and COs to formulate and develop). Seagoing TBs and TBDs in the 1890s appear largely to have been commanded from a flagship and sent as a pack to perform their specialist attack role, otherwise keeping close station with the fleet. Only with the design of the Adventure to Sentinel class scout cruisers in the early 1900s were specialist flotilla leaders created and built by Britain. This occurred at a similar time to the building of the first turbine destroyers and the River class. Scout cruisers fulfilled the leader role for the Royal Navy, in both procurement and doctrinal terms, until the First World War. Even when large destroyer-type leaders were designed and built, light cruisers being assigned to the scout role (leading and supporting the flotilla in action) were generally of modern type, like the post-scout Arethusa class.

Eventually, the rapidly increasing speed and improving seaworthiness of new destroyer designs meant that even the fastest small cruisers could not reliably keep pace with their charges in all circumstances. Accordingly, large destroyer designs were produced in small batches for use as leaders. During WW1, the Royal Navy produced these leaders in a series of small classes, quite separate in form to the contemporary standard TBD class designs. By the end of the war, one of these classes (the Admiralty V-class leader) formed the basis of future British fleet destroyer design. From the 1920s, each new class of British fleet destroyer would include one slightly enlarged derivation of the design as the leader, featuring an additional amidships gun as well as the expanded command facilities.

As destroyers changed from specialized anti-torpedo boat vessels that operated in squadrons to larger multi-purpose ships that operated alone or as leaders of groups of smaller vessels, and as command and control techniques improved (and the technology became more readily available), the need for specialized flotilla leaders decreased and their functions were adopted by all destroyers. The last specialized flotilla leader to be built for the Royal Navy was HMS Inglefield, launched in 1936. Subsequent leaders used the same design as the private ships of the class, with minor detailed changes to suit them to their role. In the Royal Navy, the flotilla leader and commanding officer were known as Captain (D). In the Royal Navy, flotilla leaders and divisional leaders could be identified by particular coloured bands painted on their funnels.

== Flotilla leader designs ==
=== French Navy ===
- Jaguar-class flotilla leader
- Guépard-class flotilla leader
- Aigle-class flotilla leader
- Le Fantasque-class flotilla leader

=== German Navy ===
- Type 1936A-class destroyer

=== Imperial Japanese Navy ===
- Tenryū-class light cruiser
- Kuma-class light cruiser
- Nagara-class light cruiser
- Sendai-class light cruiser
- Yubari
- Agano-class light cruiser

=== Royal Navy ===
- Swift – prototype (1907)
- Faulknor-class leader (1915)
- Marksman-class leader (1915)
- Parker-class leader (1916)
- Admiralty V-class leader
- Admiralty type leader (1918)
- Thornycroft type leader (1920)
- The leader of each of the "interwar standard" A- through I-classes was built to a slightly enlarged design:
  - Codrington (1930)
  - Keith (1931)
  - Kempenfelt (1932)
  - Duncan (1933)
  - Exmouth (1934)
  - Faulknor (1935)
  - Grenville (1936)
  - Hardy (1936)
  - Inglefield (1937)

=== Royal Italian Navy ===
- Capitani Romani-class flotilla leader

=== Royal Netherlands Navy ===
- Tromp-class flotilla leader (Sometimes classed as a light cruiser)

=== Royal Romanian Navy ===
- Mărăști-class flotilla leader

=== Royal Yugoslav Navy ===
- Destroyer Dubrovnik (1931)
- Destroyer Split

=== Soviet Navy ===
- Leningrad-class destroyer
- Tashkent-class destroyer

=== United States Navy ===
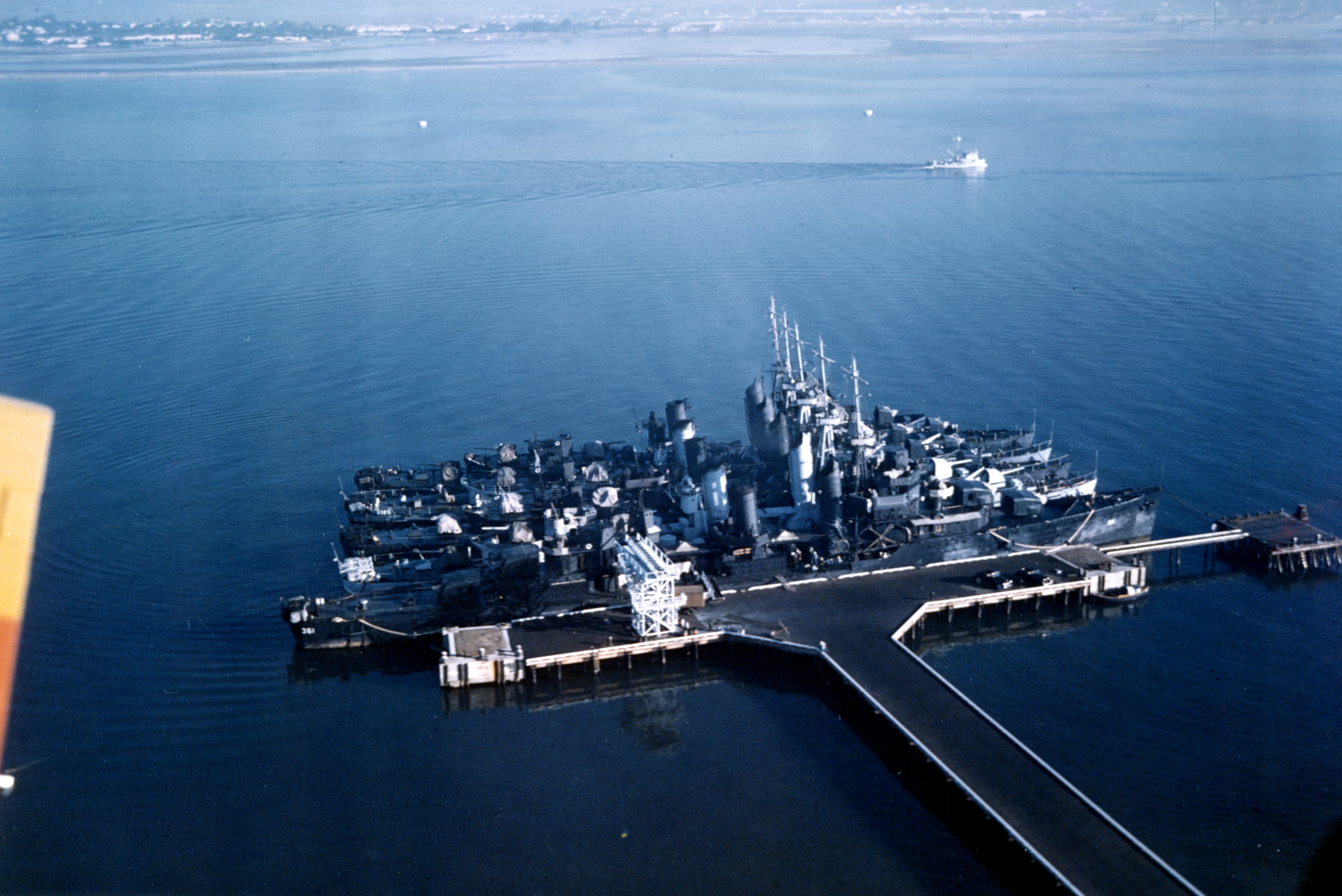
Ships of US Destroyer Squadron 3 at San Diego in 1941, with the visibly larger Porter-class flotilla leader USS Clark in front

- Porter-class destroyers
- Somers-class destroyers
- Atlanta-class light cruisers (were originally designed as flotilla leaders, though soon retasked as anti-aircraft cruisers)
- See the List of United States Navy destroyer leaders for post-World War II ships

== See also ==
- Destroyer leader
- Esploratori
- Scout cruiser
- List of destroyers of the Second World War
