= HMS Sentinel (1904) =

Sentinel-class cruiser

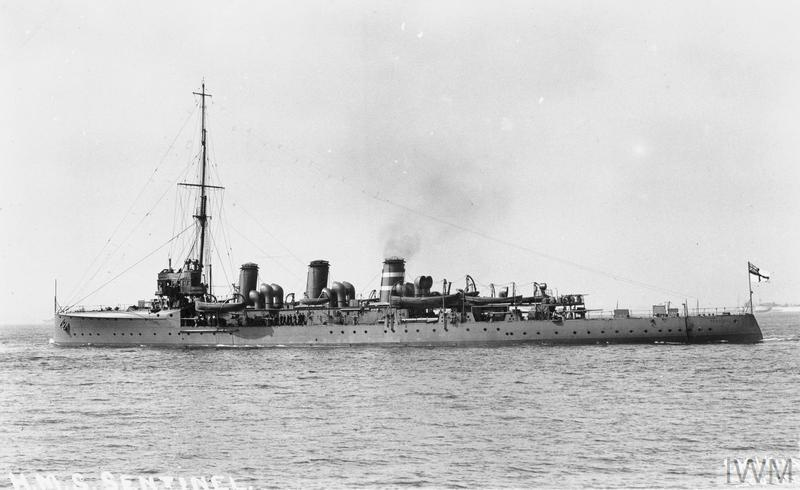

History

United Kingdom
- Name: Sentinel
- Builder: Vickers Limited, Barrow-in-Furness
- Laid down: 8 June 1903
- Launched: 19 April 1904
- Commissioned: April 1905
- Decommissioned: April 1919
- Out of service: 1920
- Reclassified: As a training ship, 1920
- Fate: Sold for scrap, 18 January 1923

General characteristics (as built)
- Class & type: Sentinel-class scout cruiser
- Displacement: 2,895 long tons (2,941 t)
- Length: 360 ft (109.7 m) (p/p)
- Beam: 40 ft (12.2 m)
- Draught: 14 ft 9 in (4.5 m) (deep load)
- Installed power: 16,500 ihp (12,300 kW); 12 water-tube boilers
- Propulsion: 2 Shafts, 2 triple-expansion steam engines
- Speed: 25 knots (46 km/h; 29 mph)
- Range: 2,460 nmi (4,560 km; 2,830 mi) at 10 knots (19 km/h; 12 mph)
- Complement: 289
- Armament: 10 × QF 12-pounder (3 in (76 mm)) guns; 8 × QF 3-pdr (47 mm) guns; 2 × 18 in (450 mm) torpedo tubes
- Armour: Deck: 0.625–1.5 in (16–38 mm); Conning tower: 3 in (76 mm)

HMS Sentinel was one of two Sentinel-class scout cruisers built for the Royal Navy in the first decade of the 20th century. The ship was initially assigned to the Mediterranean Fleet before returning home and being reduced to reserve in 1907. Recommissioned two years later as part of the Home Fleet, she spent the next five years moving on and off of active service in British waters. Sentinel was assigned to coastal defence duties when the First World War began in 1914, although she was transferred to the Mediterranean in 1915. By 1918 the ship had been assigned to the Aegean. After the end of the war in November, Sentinel was sent to the Black Sea as the British attempted to intervene in the Russian Civil War. The ship returned home in early 1919 and was paid off. She became a training ship from mid-1920 to the end of 1922 and was sold for scrap in early 1923.

== Design and description ==
The Sentinel-class ships were one of four classes of scout cruisers ordered by the Admiralty in 1902–1903 and 1903–1904 Naval Programmes. These ships were intended to work with destroyer flotillas, leading their torpedo attacks and backing them up when attacked by other destroyers, although they quickly became less useful as destroyer speeds increased before the First World War. They had a length between perpendiculars of 360 feet (109.7 m), a beam of 40 feet (12.2 m) and a draught of 14 feet 39 inches (5.3 m) at deep load. The ships displaced 2,895 long tons (2,941 t) at normal load and 3,100 long tons (3,150 t) at deep load. Their crew consisted of 289 officers and ratings.

The ships were powered by a pair of three-cylinder triple-expansion steam engines, each driving one shaft, using steam provided by a dozen Vickers Express water-tube boilers. The engines were designed to produce a total of 16,500 indicated horsepower (12,300 kW) which was intended to give a maximum speed of 25 knots (46 km/h; 29 mph). When Sentinel ran her sea trials, she reached a speed of 25.1 knots (46.5 km/h; 28.9 mph) from 16,433 ihp (12,254 kW) for eight hours. The Sentinel-class cruisers carried enough coal to give them a range of 2,460 nautical miles (4,560 km; 2,830 mi) at 10 knots (19 km/h; 12 mph).

The main armament of the Sentinel class consisted of ten quick-firing (QF) 12-pounder 3 in (76 mm) 18-cwt guns. (Note: "Cwt" is the abbreviation for hundredweight, 18 cwt referring to the weight of the gun.) Three guns were mounted abreast on the forecastle and the quarterdeck, with the remaining four guns positioned port and starboard amidships. They also carried eight 3-pounder Hotchkiss guns and two above-water 18-inch (450 mm) torpedo tubes, one on each broadside. The ships' protective deck armour ranged in thickness from 0.625 to 1.5 inches (16 to 38 mm) and the conning tower had armour 3 inches (76 mm) inches thick.

== Career ==
Sentinel was laid down by Vickers Limited at their shipyard in Barrow-in-Furness on 8 June 1903, launched on 19 April 1904 and completed in April 1905. She was originally to be named HMS Inchkeith, but was renamed in 1903, prior to launching. Not long after completion, two additional 12-pounder guns were added and the 3-pounder guns were replaced with six QF 6-pounder Hotchkiss guns. The ship began her career with the 3rd Cruiser Squadron in the Mediterranean in 1906, before being recalled to join the Channel Fleet, and then reduced to reserve in the Home Fleet from 1907. In February 1910 she was recommissioned as the leader of the 5th Destroyer Flotilla at Chatham and refitted there in June. About 1911–1912, her main guns were replaced by nine 4-inch (102 mm) guns, arranged four on each broadside and the remaining gun on the quarterdeck. After another refit in 1912 at HM Dockyard, Devonport, Sentinel was assigned to the 3rd Light Cruiser Squadron in 1913 for the annual manoeuvres and was then transferred to lead the 9th Destroyer Flotilla at Portsmouth. The ship joined the 6th Destroyer Flotilla at Dover later that year.

After the start of the First World War in August 1914, Sentinel was serving with the 8th Destroyer Flotilla in the Firth of Forth. In 1915 she was temporarily assigned with 6th Light Cruiser Squadron in the Humber to defend against Zeppelin raids, before she was transferred to the Mediterranean and then to the Aegean in 1918. Later that year, Sentinel was part of the squadron sent through the Dardanelles to undertake duties in the Black Sea, where Britain was becoming involved in the Russian Civil War. The ship paid off in April 1919 at Sheerness and served as a mechanic’s training ship at Chatham from July 1920 until the end of 1922 before being sold for scrap in January 1923.

== Bibliography ==
- Friedman, Norman (2009). British Destroyers From Earliest Days to the Second World War. Annapolis, Maryland: Naval Institute Press. ISBN 978-1-59114-081-8.
- Friedman, Norman (2011). Naval Weapons of World War One. Barnsley, South Yorkshire, UK: Seaforth. ISBN 978-1-84832-100-7.
- McBride, K. D. (1994). "The Royal Navy 'Scout' Class of 1904–05". Warship International. XXXI (3): 260–281. ISSN 0043-0374.
- Morris, Douglas (1987). Cruisers of the Royal and Commonwealth Navies Since 1879. Liskeard, UK: Maritime Books. ISBN 0-907771-35-1.
- Preston, Antony (1985). "Great Britain and Empire Forces". In Gardiner, Robert & Gray, Randal (eds.). Conway's All the World's Fighting Ships 1906–1921. Annapolis, Maryland: Naval Institute Press. pp. 1–104. ISBN 0-85177-245-5.
- Roberts, John (1979). "Great Britain (Including Empire Forces)". In Chesneau, Roger & Kolesnik, Eugene M. (eds.). Conway's All the World's Fighting Ships 1860–1905. Greenwich: Conway Maritime Press. pp. 1–114. ISBN 0-8317-0302-4.
