= Pathfinder-class cruiser =

1905 class of British scout cruisers

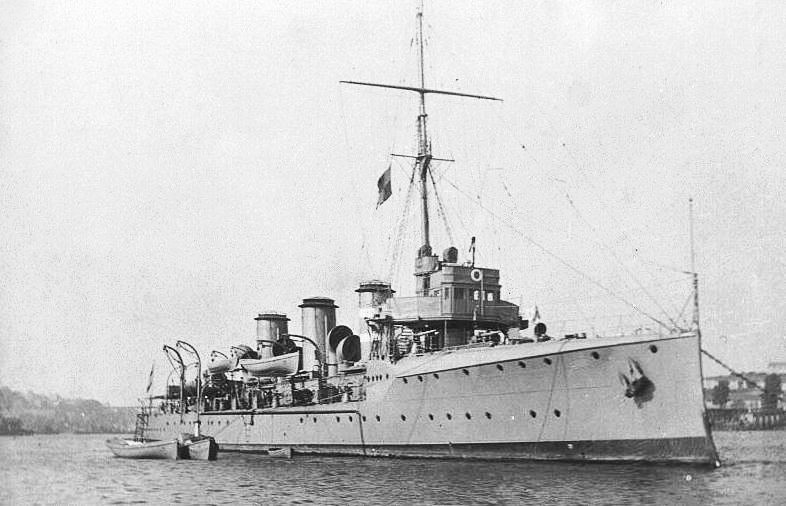
- HMS Patrol

Class overview
- Name: Pathfinder class
- Builders: Cammell Laird, Birkenhead
- Operators: Royal Navy
- Preceded by: Forward class
- Succeeded by: Sentinel class
- Built: 1903–1905
- In commission: 1905–1919
- Completed: 2
- Lost: 1
- Scrapped: 1

General characteristics (as built)
- Type: Scout cruiser
- Displacement: 2,940 long tons (2,987 t)
- Length: 370 ft (112.8 m) (p/p)
- Beam: 38 ft 9 in (11.8 m)
- Draught: 15 ft 2 in (4.6 m) (deep load)
- Installed power: 16,500 ihp (12,300 kW); 12 Laird-Normand boilers
- Propulsion: 2 Shafts, 2 triple-expansion steam engines
- Speed: 25 knots (46 km/h; 29 mph)
- Range: 3,400 nmi (6,300 km; 3,900 mi) at 10 knots (19 km/h; 12 mph)
- Complement: 289
- Armament: 10 × QF 12-pdr 3 in (76 mm) guns; 8 × QF 3-pdr (47 mm) guns; 2 × 18 in (450 mm) torpedo tubes
- Armour: Waterline belt: 2 in (51 mm); Deck: 0.625–1.5 in (15.9–38.1 mm); Conning tower: 3 in (76 mm)

The Pathfinder-class cruisers were a pair of scout cruisers built for the Royal Navy in the first decade of the 20th century. The sister ships spent much of the first decade of their careers in reserve. When the First World War began in August 1914 they were given coastal defence missions, Pathfinder on the coast of Scotland and Patrol on the coast of Yorkshire. The latter ship was badly damaged when the Germans bombarded Hartlepool in December. She spent the rest of the war in British waters. The ship was paid off in 1919 and sold for scrap the following year. Pathfinder was sunk by a German submarine shortly after the war began, the first sinking of a British warship during the war by a German submarine.

== Background and description ==
In 1901–1902, the Admiralty developed scout cruisers to work with destroyer flotillas, leading their torpedo attacks and backing them up when attacked by other destroyers. In May 1902, it requested tenders for a design that was capable of 25 knots (46 km/h; 29 mph), a protective deck, a range of 2,000 nautical miles (3,700 km; 2,300 mi) and an armament of six quick-firing (QF) 12-pounder (3 in (76 mm)) 18 cwt guns, (Note: "Cwt" is the abbreviation for hundredweight, 18 cwt referring to the weight of the gun.) eight QF 3-pounder (47 mm) guns and two 18-inch (450 mm) torpedo tubes. It accepted four of the submissions and ordered one ship from each builder in the 1902–1903 Naval Programme and a repeat in the following year's programme.

The two ships from Cammell Laird became the Pathfinder class. Four more 12-pounders were added to the specification in August. The ships had a length between perpendiculars of 370 feet (112.8 m), a beam of 38 feet 9 inches (11.8 m) and a draught of 15 feet 2 inches (4.6 m) at deep load. They displaced 2,940 long tons (2,987 t) at normal load and 3,240 long tons (3,292 t) at deep load. Their crew consisted of 289 officers and ratings.

The Pathfinder-class ships were powered by a pair of four-cylinder triple-expansion steam engines, each driving one shaft, using steam provided by a dozen Laird-Normand boilers that exhausted into three funnels. The engines were designed to produce a total of 16,500 indicated horsepower (12,300 kW) which was intended to give a maximum speed of 25 knots. Pathfinder slightly exceeded her design speed when she ran her sea trials in 1905. The scout cruisers soon proved too slow for this role as newer destroyers outpaced them. The sisters carried a maximum of 600 long tons (610 t) of coal which gave them a range of 3,400 nautical miles (6,300 km; 3,900 mi) at 10 knots (19 km/h; 12 mph).

The main armament of the Pathfinder class consisted of ten QF 12-pounder 18-cwt guns. Three guns were mounted abreast on the forecastle and the quarterdeck, with the remaining four guns positioned port and starboard amidships. They also carried eight QF 3-pounder Hotchkiss guns and two single mounts for 18-inch torpedo tubes, one on each broadside. The ships' protective deck armour ranged in thickness from .625 to 1.5 inches (16 to 38 mm) and the conning tower had armour 3 inches (76 mm) inches thick. They had a waterline belt 2 inches (51 mm) thick abreast engine rooms only.

== Ships ==
Construction data
Ship	Builder	Laid down	Launched	Completed	Fate
HMS Pathfinder	Cammell Laird, Birkenhead	15 August 1903	16 July 1904	18 July 1905	Sunk by a submarine, 5 September 1914
HMS Patrol	Cammell Laird, Birkenhead	31 October 1903	13 October 1904	26 September 1905	Sold for scrap, April 1920

== Service ==
The sisters were in reserve for most of the first decade of their existence. After the beginning of the First World War in August 1914, they were assigned to coastal defence duties on the East Coast of England. Patrol was badly damaged during the German bombardment of Hartlepool in mid-December 1914 when she attempted to exit the harbour during the bombardment. After repairs were completed she remained on coast defence duties until she was transferred to the Irish Sea in 1918. The ship was paid off in 1919 and sold for scrap in 1920.

Pathfinder was originally to have been named Fastnet but the name was changed before construction was started. Leader of the 8th Destroyer Flotilla, she was torpedoed and sunk by the German submarine U-21 in the approaches to the Firth of Forth on 5 August 1914 with the loss of 259 men, giving her the distinction of being the first warship sunk by a submarine.

== Bibliography ==
- Friedman, Norman (2009). British Destroyers From Earliest Days to the Second World War. Annapolis, Maryland: Naval Institute Press. ISBN 978-1-59114-081-8.
- Friedman, Norman (2011). Naval Weapons of World War One. Barnsley, South Yorkshire, UK: Seaforth. ISBN 978-1-84832-100-7.
- Goldrick, James (2015). Before Jutland: The Naval War in Northern European Waters, August 1914–February 1915. Annapolis, Maryland: Naval Institute Press. ISBN 978-1-59114-349-9.
- McBride, K. D. (1994). "The Royal Navy 'Scout' Class of 1904–05". Warship International. XXXI (3): 260–281. ISSN 0043-0374.
- Morris, Douglas (1987). Cruisers of the Royal and Commonwealth Navies Since 1879. Liskeard, UK: Maritime Books. ISBN 0-907771-35-1.
- Preston, Antony (1985). "Great Britain and Empire Forces". In Gardiner, Robert & Gray, Randal (eds.). Conway's All the World's Fighting Ships 1906–1921. Annapolis, Maryland: Naval Institute Press. pp. 1–104. ISBN 0-85177-245-5.
- Roberts, John (1979). "Great Britain (Including Empire Forces)". In Chesneau, Roger & Kolesnik, Eugene M. (eds.). Conway's All the World's Fighting Ships 1860–1905. Greenwich: Conway Maritime Press. pp. 1–114. ISBN 0-8317-0302-4.
