= HMS Skirmisher =

Sentinel-class cruiser

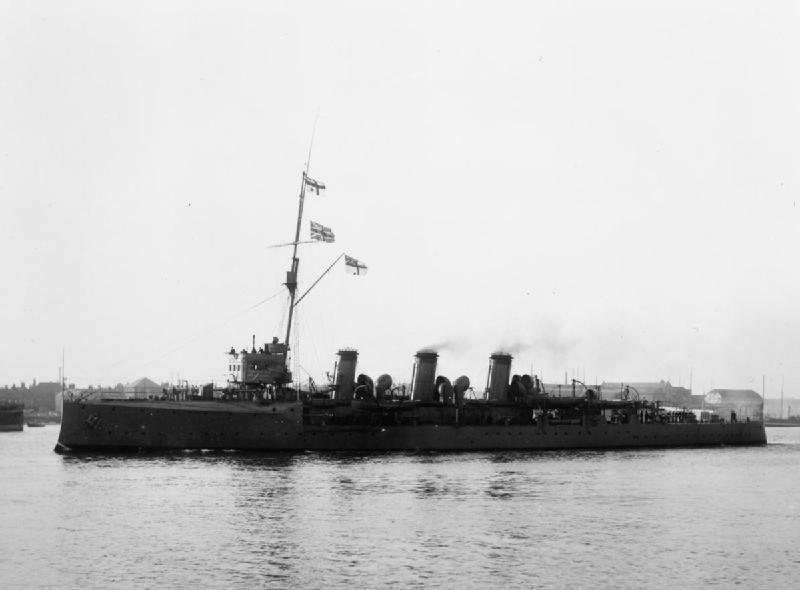

History

United Kingdom
- Name: Skirmisher
- Builder: Vickers Limited, Barrow-in-Furness
- Laid down: July 1903
- Launched: 7 February 1905
- Commissioned: July 1905
- Fate: Sold for scrap, 3 March 1920

General characteristics (as built)
- Class & type: Sentinel-class scout cruiser
- Displacement: 2,895 long tons (2,941 t)
- Length: 360 ft (109.7 m) (p/p)
- Beam: 40 ft (12.2 m)
- Draught: 14 ft 9 in (4.5 m) (deep load)
- Installed power: 16,500 ihp (12,300 kW); 12 water-tube boilers
- Propulsion: 2 Shafts, 2 triple-expansion steam engines
- Speed: 25 knots (46 km/h; 29 mph)
- Range: 2,460 nmi (4,560 km; 2,830 mi) at 10 knots (19 km/h; 12 mph)
- Complement: 289
- Armament: 10 × QF 12-pounder (3 in (76 mm)) guns; 8 × QF 3-pdr (47 mm) guns; 2 × 18 in (450 mm) torpedo tubes
- Armour: Deck: 0.625–1.125 in (16–29 mm); Conning tower: 3 in (76 mm)

HMS Skirmisher was one of two Sentinel-class scout cruisers built for the Royal Navy during the first decade of the 20th century. Completed in 1905 the ship was placed in reserve until she was commissioned in 1907 as part of the Home Fleet. She then spent the next seven years moving on and off of active service in British waters. Skirmisher was assigned to coastal defence duties when the First World War began in 1914, although she was transferred to the Mediterranean in 1915 and then to the Aegean two years later. The ship returned home in mid-1919 and was sold for scrap in 1920.

== Design and description ==
The Sentinel-class ships were one of four classes of scout cruisers ordered by the Admiralty in 1902–1903 and 1903–1904 Naval Programmes. These ships were intended to work with destroyer flotillas, leading their torpedo attacks and backing them up when attacked by other destroyers, although they were rendered obsolete as faster, turbine-engined, destroyers entered service before the First World War. They had a length between perpendiculars of 360 feet (109.7 m), a beam of 40 feet (12.2 m) and a draught of 14 feet 9 inches (4.5 m) at deep load. The ships displaced 2,895 long tons (2,941 t) at normal load and 3,100 long tons (3,150 t) at deep load. Their crew consisted of 289 officers and ratings.

The ships were powered by two four-cylinder triple-expansion steam engines fed by 12 Vickers-Express water-tube boilers, and driving a pair of three-bladed propellers. The turbines were rated at 17,000 indicated horsepower (13,000 kW) to meet the required speed of 25 knots (46 km/h; 29 mph). When Sentinel ran her sea trials, she reached a speed of 25.2 knots (46.7 km/h; 29.0 mph) from 17,031 ihp (12,700 kW) for eight hours. The Sentinel-class cruisers carried enough coal to give them a range of 2,460 nautical miles (4,560 km; 2,830 mi) at 10 knots (19 km/h; 12 mph).

Skirmisher's main armour protection consisted of an arched protective deck, covering the full length of the ship, which was 1 1/2–5/8 inch (38–16 mm) thick, while the ship's conning tower was protected by 3 inches (76 mm) of armour. The scout cruisers were intended to lead and support destroyer flotillas, and their armament was meant to fight destroyers rather than heavier ships. Main gun armament consisted of ten 12-pounder (76 mm) QF guns, arranged three abreast fore-and-aft to give maximum end-on fire for chase engagements and two more guns on each beam. This was supplemented by eight 3-pounder (47 mm) guns. Two 18 inch (450 mm) torpedo tubes were fitted in above-water mounts, with a single spare torpedo carried. This armament was considered too light, and an additional two 12-pounder guns were added on the ship's beams soon after commissioning, while the 3-pounder guns were replaced by six 6-pounder (57 mm) guns. She was rearmed again in 1911–1912, when the 12-pounders were replaced by nine 4-inch (102 mm) guns.

== Construction and career ==
Skirmisher, the only ship of her name to serve with the Royal Navy, was laid down at Vickers, Sons & Maxim's Barrow-in-Furness shipyard on 29 July 1903 and was launched on 7 February 1905. Completed in July 1905 at a cost of about £276,579, she was initially placed in reserve.

In 1907, Skirmisher commissioned as leader of the 5th Destroyer Flotilla based at Dover, part of the Home Fleet. In May 1909 she became leader of the 2nd Destroyer Flotilla, moving to the 4th Destroyer Flotilla at Portsmouth in 1910. She was refitted in 1912, and took part in the 1913 Naval Manoeuvres before joining the 7th Destroyer Flotilla, a patrol flotilla equipped with older destroyers, as leader in July 1913. During her early career, her captains included Walter Cowan and William Boyle, both of whom would later rise to the rank of Admiral.

Skirmisher remained leader of the 7th Flotilla, based at Devonport, on the eve of the outbreak of the First World War. Following the outbreak of war, the 7th Flotilla moved to the Humber on the East Coast of Britain. On 15 December 1914, German battlecruisers, supported by the battleships of the main German High Seas Fleet set out on a raid against the coastal towns of Scarborough, Whitby and Hartlepool. While the British had been warned by radio intercepts that the Germans were likely to carry out some sort of action, and sent out forces from the Grand Fleet to intercept, Admiral George A. Ballard, Admiral of Patrols in overall command of all the patrol flotillas, had, owing to poor weather, ordered the forces under his command to remain in harbor until they received explicit orders to sail. On receiving word of the bombardments, Ballard set out from the Humber in Skirmisher at together with eight torpedo boats. Heavy seas forced Ballard to send the torpedo boats back to port, while he searched up the coast in Skirmisher for the German raiders. Skirmisher failed to find the Germans, who had sailed eastwards well before Ballard reached the bombarded towns.

In May 1915 Skirmisher, still based on the Humber, joined the 6th Light Cruiser Squadron, with duties including patrolling to spot German Zeppelins. By October 1915, the 6th Light Cruiser Squadron had been broken up, and Skirmisher had joined the Mediterranean Fleet. Skirmisher remained part of the Mediterranean Fleet throughout 1916 and into 1917, joining the Aegean Squadron in September that year. On 20 January 1918, the Turkish battlecruiser Yavuz Sultan Selim (formerly the German Goeben) and light cruiser Midilli (formerly Breslau) made a sortie into the Mediterranean from the Dardanelles. The two Turkish ships attacked and sunk the monitors Raglan and M28 in the Battle of Imbros. On hearing of the attack on the monitors, Captain P. W. Dumas, commander of the old pre-dreadnought battleship Agamemnon, in port at the British base of Mudos with Skirmisher, the scout Foresight and the light cruiser Lowestoft, ordered these ships to raise steam in preparation to set out against the enemy force. Meanwhile, Vice-Admiral Hubert von Rebeur-Paschwitz, commander of the Turkish force (Note: Despite being nominally part of the Turkish fleet, Yavuz and Midilli were still largely crewed by Germans.) ordered Yavuz and Midilli to attack Mudros. Both Turkish ships struck mines, with Midilli soon sinking and Yavuz badly damaged. By the time the British ships had left Mudros harbor, Yavuz was re-entering the Dardanelles, protected against surface attack by shore batteries. Skirmisher remained part of the Aegean Squadron until the end of the war.

Skirmisher had been ordered to return to home waters by May 1919, and was in reserve at Immingham in the Humber by June. On 3 March 1920 she was sold for scrap to Thos. W. Ward, of Preston.

== Bibliography ==
- Corbett, Julian S. (1921). History of the Great War: Naval Operations: Vol. II. London: Longmans Green. OCLC 1185863.
- Colledge, J. J.; Warlow, Ben (2006) [1969]. Ships of the Royal Navy: The Complete Record of All Fighting Ships of the Royal Navy from the 15th Century to the Present (3rd Rev ed.). London: Chatham Publishing. ISBN 978-1-86176-281-8. OCLC 67375475.
- Dittmar, F.J.; Colledge, J.J. (1972). British Warships 1914–1919. Shepperton, UK: Ian Allan. ISBN 0-7110-0380-7.
- Friedman, Norman (2009). British Destroyers: From Earliest Days to the Second World War. Barnsley, UK: Seaforth Publishing. ISBN 978-1-84832-049-9.
- "H.M.S. Skirmisher" (PDF). The Engineer. 10 March 1905. p. 240.
- Viscount Hythe, ed. (1912). The Naval Annual 1912. Portsmouth, UK: J. Griffin & Co.
- Manning, T. D. (1961). The British Destroyer. London: Putnam & Co. OCLC 752694184.
- Massie, Robert K. (2007). Castles of Steel: Britain, Germany and the Winning of the War at Sea. London: Vintage Books. ISBN 978-0-099-52378-9.
- McBride, K. D. (1994). "The Royal Navy 'Scout' Class of 1904–05". Warship International. XXXI (3): 260–281. ISSN 0043-0374.
- Preston, Antony (1985). "Great Britain and Empire Forces". In Gardiner, Robert; Gray, Randal (eds.). Conway's All The World's Fighting Ships 1906–1921. London: Conway Maritime Press. pp. 1–104. ISBN 0-85177-245-5.
- Roberts, John (1979). "Great Britain (Including Empire Forces)". In Chesneau, Roger; Kolesnik, Eugene M (eds.). Conway's All The World's Fighting Ships 1860–1905. London: Conway Maritime Press. pp. 1–114. ISBN 0-85177-133-5.
