= Sentinel-class cruiser =

Cruiser class of the Royal Navy

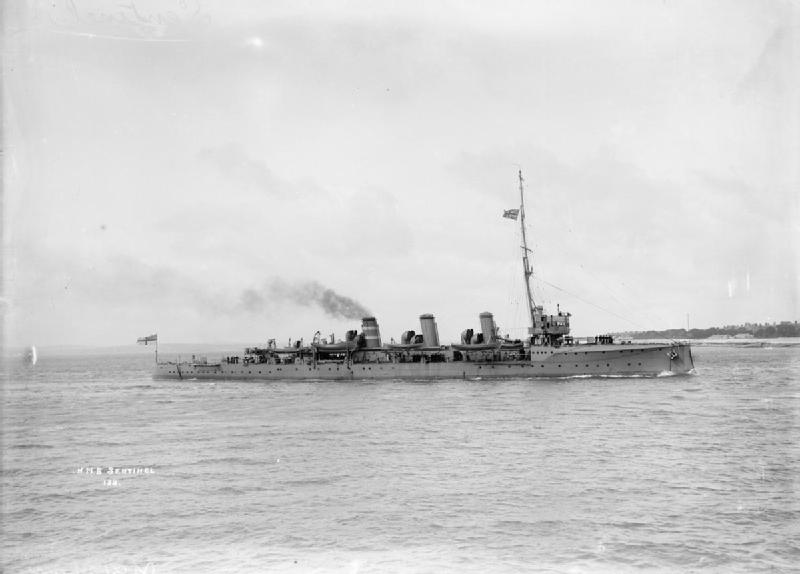
- HMS Sentinel

Class overview
- Name: Sentinel class
- Builders: Vickers Limited, Barrow
- Operators: Royal Navy
- Preceded by: Pathfinder class
- Succeeded by: Boadicea class
- Built: 1903–1905
- In service: 1905–1923
- In commission: 1905–1920
- Completed: 2
- Scrapped: 2

General characteristics (as built)
- Type: Scout cruiser
- Displacement: 2,895 long tons (2,941 t)
- Length: 360 ft (109.7 m) (p/p); 381 ft (116.1 m) (o/a)
- Beam: 40 ft (12.2 m)
- Draught: 14 ft 9 in (4.5 m) (deep load)
- Installed power: 12 water-tube boilers; 16,500 ihp (12,300 kW)
- Propulsion: 2 shafts; 2 triple-expansion steam engines
- Speed: 25 knots (46 km/h; 29 mph)
- Range: 2,460 nmi (4,560 km; 2,830 mi) at 10 knots (19 km/h; 12 mph)
- Complement: 289
- Armament: 10 × 12 pdr (3 in (76 mm)) guns; 8 × 3 pdr (47 mm (1.9 in)) guns; 2 × 18 in (450 mm) torpedo tubes
- Armour: Deck: 0.625–1.5 in (16–38 mm); Conning tower: 3 in (76 mm)

The Sentinel-class cruisers were a pair of scout cruisers built for the Royal Navy in the first decade of the 20th century. The sister ships spent about half of the first decade of their careers in reserve and were based in home waters when on active duty. When the First World War began in August 1914 they were given coastal defence missions on the north eastern coast of Britain. The ships were transferred to the Mediterranean in 1915 and then to the Aegean in mid-1916 where they remained until the end of the war in late 1918. Skirmisher was paid off in 1919 and was scrapped the following year, but Sentinel supported the British attempt to intervene in the Russian Civil War for a few months after the end of the war. She also returned home in 1919, but served as a training ship for a few years before she was broken up in 1923.

== Background and description ==
In 1901–1902, the Admiralty developed scout cruisers to work with destroyer flotillas, leading their torpedo attacks and backing them up when attacked by other destroyers. In May 1902, it requested tenders for a design that was capable of 25 knots (46 km/h; 29 mph), a protective deck, a range of 2,000 nautical miles (3,700 km; 2,300 mi) and an armament of six quick-firing (QF) 12-pounder (3 in (76 mm)) 18 cwt guns, (Note: "Cwt" is the abbreviation for hundredweight, 18 cwt referring to the weight of the gun.) eight QF 3-pounder (47 mm) guns and two 18-inch (450 mm) torpedo tubes. It accepted four of the submissions and ordered one ship from each builder in the 1902–1903 Naval Programme and a repeat in the following year's programme.

The two ships from Vickers became the Sentinel class. Four more 12-pounders were added to the specification in August. The ships had a length between perpendiculars of 360 feet (109.7 m), a beam of 40 feet (12.2 m) and a draught of 14 feet 9 inches (4.5 m) at deep load. They displaced 2,895 long tons (2,941 t) at normal load and 3,100 long tons (3,150 t) at deep load. Their crew consisted of 289 officers and ratings. The Sentinels differed from the other scout cruiser classes (the Adventure, Forward and Pathfinder classes) in having a turtleback forecastle and shorter funnels.

The Sentinel-class ships were powered by a pair of four-cylinder triple-expansion steam engines, each driving one shaft, using steam provided by a dozen Vickers Express water-tube boilers that exhausted into three funnels. The engines were designed to produce a total of 16,500 indicated horsepower (12,300 kW) which was intended to give a maximum speed of 25 knots. The Sentinels barely exceeded their design speed when they ran their sea trials in 1905. The scout cruisers soon proved too slow for this role as newer destroyers outpaced them. The sisters carried a maximum of 410 long tons (417 t) of coal which gave them a range of 2,460 nautical miles (4,560 km; 2,830 mi) at 10 knots (19 km/h; 12 mph).

The main armament of the Sentinel class consisted of ten QF 12-pounder 18-cwt guns. Three guns were mounted abreast on the forecastle and the quarterdeck, with the remaining four guns positioned port and starboard amidships. They also carried eight QF 3-pounder Hotchkiss guns and two single mounts for 18-inch torpedo tubes, one on each broadside. The ships' protective deck armour ranged in thickness from .625 to 1.5 inches (16 to 38 mm) and the conning tower had armour 3 inches (76 mm) inches thick.

== Ships ==
Construction data
Ship	Builder	Laid down	Launched	Completed	Fate
Sentinel	Vickers, Barrow-in-Furness	8 June 1903	19 April 1904	April 1905	Sold for scrap, January 1923
Skirmisher	Vickers, Barrow-in-Furness	29 February 1903	7 February 1905	July 1905	Sold for scrap, March 1920

== Service history ==
The sisters were on and off active service in British waters for most of the first decade of their existence. After the beginning of the First World War, they were assigned to coastal defence duties, Sentinel on the Scottish coast and Skirmisher at the Humber estuary. The ships were sent to the Mediterranean in 1915 and were then assigned to the Aegean Sea two years later and remained there until the end of the war. After returning home in 1919, Skirmisher was paid off and was sold for scrap in early 1920. Sentinel was sent to the Black Sea for a few months after the end of the war as the British attempted to intervene in the Russian Civil War. She too returned home in 1919, but served as a training ship in 1920–1922 before being broken up in 1923.

== Bibliography ==
- Brown, David K. (2003). Warrior to Dreadnought: Warship Development 1860–1905. London: Caxton Editions. ISBN 1-84067-529-2.
- Friedman, Norman (2009). British Destroyers From Earliest Days to the Second World War. Annapolis, Maryland: Naval Institute Press. ISBN 978-1-59114-081-8.
- Friedman, Norman (2011). Naval Weapons of World War One. Barnsley, South Yorkshire, UK: Seaforth. ISBN 978-1-84832-100-7.
- McBride, K. D. (1994). "The Royal Navy 'Scout' Class of 1904–05". Warship International. XXXI (3): 260–281. ISSN 0043-0374.
- Morris, Douglas (1987). Cruisers of the Royal and Commonwealth Navies Since 1879. Liskeard, UK: Maritime Books. ISBN 0-907771-35-1.
- Preston, Antony (1985). "Great Britain and Empire Forces". In Gardiner, Robert & Gray, Randal (eds.). Conway's All the World's Fighting Ships 1906–1921. Annapolis, Maryland: Naval Institute Press. pp. 1–104. ISBN 0-85177-245-5.
- Roberts, John (1979). "Great Britain (Including Empire Forces)". In Chesneau, Roger & Kolesnik, Eugene M. (eds.). Conway's All the World's Fighting Ships 1860–1905. Greenwich: Conway Maritime Press. pp. 1–114. ISBN 0-8317-0302-4.
