= Adventure-class cruiser =

Cruiser class of the Royal Navy

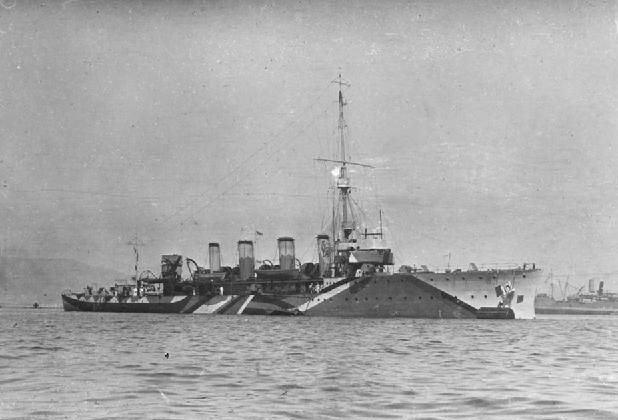
- HMS Adventure in dazzle camouflage during the First World War

Class overview
- Name: Adventure class
- Builders: Armstrong Whitworth, Elswick
- Operators: Royal Navy
- Preceded by: None
- Succeeded by: Forward class
- Built: 1904–1905
- In commission: 1905–1919
- Completed: 2
- Scrapped: 2

General characteristics (as built)
- Type: Scout cruiser
- Displacement: 2,670 long tons (2,713 t)
- Length: 374 ft (114.0 m) (p/p)
- Beam: 38 ft 3 in (11.7 m)
- Draught: 12 ft 5 in (3.8 m)
- Installed power: 12 Yarrow boilers; 16,000 ihp (12,000 kW)
- Propulsion: 2 Shafts, 2 triple-expansion steam engines
- Speed: 25 knots (46 km/h; 29 mph)
- Range: 2,370 nmi (4,390 km; 2,730 mi) at 10 knots (19 km/h; 12 mph)
- Complement: 289
- Armament: 10 × QF 12-pdr (3 in (76 mm)) guns; 8 × QF 3 pdr (47 mm) guns; 2 × 18 in (457 mm) torpedo tubes
- Armour: Deck: 0.75–2 in (19–51 mm); Conning tower: 3 in (76 mm)

The Adventure-class cruisers were a pair of scout cruisers built for the Royal Navy in the first decade of the 20th century. The sister ships spent about half of the first decade of their careers in reserve and were based in home waters when on active duty. During this time Attentive was involved in two collisions. When the First World War began in August 1914 the ships were given coastal defence missions on the English Channel. Attentive was transferred to Ireland in mid-1915, but Adventure remained with the Dover Patrol for another three years. They were assigned convoy escort duties in the Atlantic Ocean in 1918 before being separated when Attentive was transferred to the Mediterranean and Adventure was tasked to support the British intervention in North Russia. The sisters returned home a few months after the end of the war in November 1918 and were sold for scrap in 1920.

== Background and design ==
In 1901–1902, the Admiralty developed scout cruisers to work with destroyer flotillas, leading their torpedo attacks and backing them up when attacked by other destroyers. In May 1902, it requested tenders for a design that was capable of 25 knots (46 km/h; 29 mph), a protective deck, a range of 2,000 nautical miles (3,700 km; 2,300 mi) and an armament of six quick-firing (QF) 12-pounder (3 in (76 mm)) 18 cwt guns, (Note: "Cwt" is the abbreviation for hundredweight, 18 cwt referring to the weight of the gun.) eight QF 3-pounder (47 mm) guns and two 18-inch (457 mm) torpedo tubes. It accepted four of the submissions and ordered one ship from each builder in the 1902–1903 Naval Programme and a repeat in the following year's programme.

The two ships from Armstrong Whitworth became the Adventure class. Four more 12-pounders were added to the specification in August. The ships had a length between perpendiculars of 374 feet (114 m), a beam of 38 feet 3 inches (11.7 m) and a draught of 12 feet 5 inches (3.8 m). They displaced 2,670 long tons (2,713 t) at normal load and 2,893 long tons (2,939 t) at deep load. Their crew consisted of 289 officers and ratings. The Adventure-class ships were the only one of this group of scout cruisers to have four funnels and a clipper-style bow. The Brazilian Bahia-class scout cruisers were derived from these ships.

The ships were powered by a pair of three-cylinder triple-expansion steam engines, each driving one shaft, using steam provided by a dozen Yarrow boilers. The engines were designed to produce a total of 16,000 indicated horsepower (12,000 kW) which was intended to give a maximum speed of 25 knots. The Adventures barely exceeded their design speed when they ran their sea trials in 1905. The scout cruisers soon proved too slow for this role as faster, turbine-engined, destroyers entered service before the First World War. The sisters carried a maximum of 454 long tons (461 t) of coal which gave them a range of 2,370 nautical miles (4,390 km; 2,730 mi) at 10 knots (19 km/h; 12 mph).

The main armament of the Adventure class consisted of ten QF 12-pounder 18-cwt guns. Three guns were mounted abreast on the forecastle and the quarterdeck, with the remaining four guns positioned port and starboard amidships. They also carried eight QF three-pounder Hotchkiss guns and two single mounts for 18-inch torpedo tubes, one on each broadside. The ships' protective deck armour ranged in thickness from 0.75 to 2 inches (19 to 51 mm) and the conning tower had armour 3 inches (76 mm) thick.

== Ships ==
Construction data
Ship	Builder	Laid down	Launched	Completed	Fate
HMS Adventure	Armstrong Whitworth, Elswick, Tyne and Wear	7 January 1904	8 September 1904	October 1905	Sold for scrap, 3 March 1920
HMS Attentive	Armstrong Whitworth, Elswick, Tyne and Wear	8 January 1904	22 November 1904	October 1905	Sold for scrap, 12 April 1920

== Construction and service ==
The sisters were placed in reserve for two years after completion, during which time two additional 12-pounder guns were added and the 3-pounder guns were replaced with six QF 6-pounder Hotchkiss guns. They were commissioned in mid-1907 as flotilla leaders in the Home Fleet and they spent the next seven years moving on and off of active service in British waters. During this time Attentive sank one destroyer and damaged two others in collisions. In 1911–1912, they were rearmed with nine QF 4-inch (102 mm) Mk IV guns. When the First World War began, the sisters were assigned to coastal defence duties, in the English Channel. In mid-1915 Adventure was transferred to Irish waters to serve as the flagship there while Attentive remained with the Dover Patrol until 1918. That year she played a minor role in the Zeebrugge Raid in early 1918 and was then assigned to escort convoys to Gibraltar together with her sister. Attentive was transferred to the Mediterranean at the end of the war while Adventure was sent to the Arctic to support the unsuccessful British attempt to intervene in the Russian Civil War. The sisters returned home around the beginning of 1919 to be paid off; they were sold for scrap in 1920.

== Bibliography ==
- Brook, Peter (1999). Warships for Export: Armstrong Warships 1867 – 1927. Gravesend, Kent, UK: World Ship Society. ISBN 0-905617-89-4.
- Friedman, Norman (2009). British Destroyers From Earliest Days to the Second World War. Annapolis, Maryland: Naval Institute Press. ISBN 978-1-59114-081-8.
- Friedman, Norman (2011). Naval Weapons of World War One. Barnsley, South Yorkshire, UK: Seaforth. ISBN 978-1-84832-100-7.
- McBride, K. D. (1994). "The Royal Navy 'Scout' Class of 1904–05". Warship International. XXXI (3): 260–281. ISSN 0043-0374.
- Morris, Douglas (1987). Cruisers of the Royal and Commonwealth Navies Since 1879. Liskeard, UK: Maritime Books. ISBN 0-907771-35-1.
- Preston, Antony (1985). "Great Britain and Empire Forces". In Gardiner, Robert & Gray, Randal (eds.). Conway's All the World's Fighting Ships 1906–1921. Annapolis, Maryland: Naval Institute Press. pp. 1–104. ISBN 0-85177-245-5.
- Roberts, John (1979). "Great Britain (Including Empire Forces)". In Chesneau, Roger & Kolesnik, Eugene M. (eds.). Conway's All the World's Fighting Ships 1860–1905. Greenwich: Conway Maritime Press. pp. 1–114. ISBN 0-8317-0302-4.
