= 8th Destroyer Flotilla =

- Active: August 1911 – May 1939
- Country: United Kingdom
- Branch: Royal Navy
- Size: Flotilla

Commanders
- First: Commander Charles Wills
- Last: Captain Harold Hickling

The 8th Destroyer Flotilla, also styled as the Eighth Destroyer Flotilla, was a military formation of the British Royal Navy from 1911 to 1939.

== History ==
The flotilla was established in August 1911. In 1912 it was assigned to the Admiral of Patrols command and was based at Chatham Dockyard. For the duration of World War I it was on patrol duties. Post First World War it was transferred to the Mediterranean Fleet from 1921 to 1924. In 1925 it was reassigned to the China Station where it remained just before the Second World War in May 1939 when it was renamed 21st Destroyer Flotilla. It was first commanded by Commander Charles Wills and last commanded by Captain Harold Hickling.

== Administration ==
=== Captains (D) afloat, 8th Destroyer Flotilla ===
Captain (D) afloat is a Royal Navy appointment of an operational commander of a destroyer flotilla or squadron.

== Sources ==
- Dannreuther, Raymond (2005). Somerville's Force H: The Royal Navy's Gibraltar-based Fleet, June 1940 to March 1942 (1st ed.). London: Aurum. ISBN 978-1-84513-020-6.
- Harley, Simon; Lovell, Tony (2018). "Eighth Destroyer Flotilla (Royal Navy)". www dreadnoughtproject org.
- Smith, Gordon (2015). Watson, Graham (ed.). "Royal Navy Organisation and Ship Deployment, Inter-War Years 1914–1918". Naval History Net.
- Whitby, Michael (2011). Commanding Canadians: The Second World War Diaries of A. F. C. Layard. Vancouver, Canada: UBC Press. ISBN 978-0-7748-4037-8.
