= Scout cruiser =

Type of cruiser

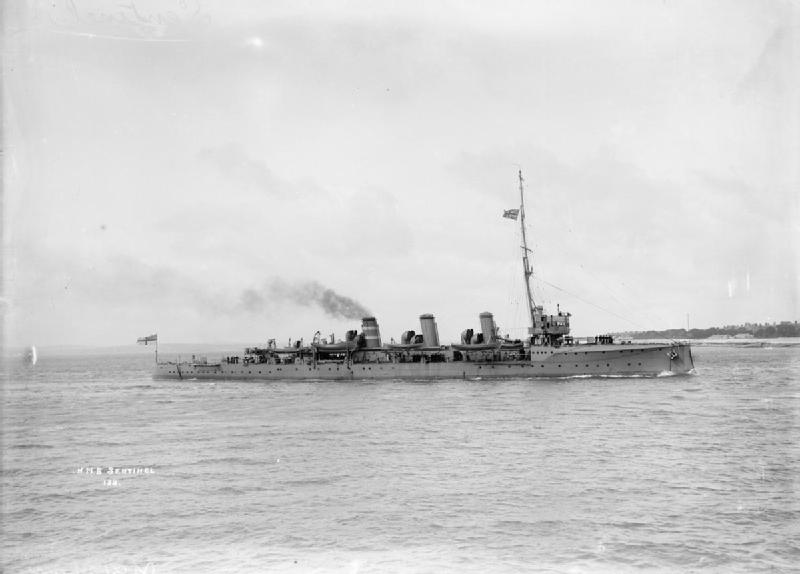
HMS Sentinel, the first scout cruiser

A scout cruiser was a type of warship of the early 20th century, which was smaller, faster, lightly armed and armoured than protected cruisers or light cruisers, but larger than contemporary destroyers. Intended for fleet scouting duties and acting as a flotilla leader, a scout cruiser was typically armed with six to ten destroyer-type guns of 3-inch (76 mm) to 4.7-inch (120 mm) calibre, plus two to four torpedo tubes.

The British were the first to operate scout cruisers, when the Royal Navy acquired 15 ships divided into two distinct groups: eight vessels ordered under the 1903 Programme, and seven heavier-armed vessels ordered under the 1907–1910 Programmes. All these ships served in World War I, although the advent of better machinery and larger, faster destroyers and light cruisers had already made them obsolete.

The other major operator of scout cruisers was the Kingdom of Italy. With no conventional protected cruisers or light cruisers planned between 1900 and 1928, the Italian Royal Navy (Italian: Regia Marina) instead operated a number of scout cruisers (esploratori) from 1912 onwards. Ranging in size from enlarged destroyers to substantial, light-cruiser-like ships, these esploratori were also given secondary capabilities as fast minelayers. Later esploratori, such as the Leone class, carried extremely heavy armament for their modest size, capable of outgunning any destroyer of the early 1920s. By 1938 the surviving esploratori were re-rated as destroyers.

== Scout cruiser designs ==
=== Austro-Hungarian Navy ===
- Admiral Spaun
- Novara class

=== Brazilian Navy ===
- Bahia class

=== Kriegsmarine ===
- Spähkreuzer – Translates to 'scout cruiser' in English; developed from late 1930s Zerstörer 1938A/Ac large ocean-going destroyer design concept intended for oceanic escort.

=== Peruvian Navy ===
- Almirante Grau class

=== Regia Marina ===
Note: this list includes all vessels rated as scouts (esploratori) by Italy.

- Agordat class – protected cruisers, rated as esploratori from 1914 to 1921
- Quarto
- Nino Bixio class
- Alessandro Poerio class - included Cesare Rossarol
- Mirabello class
- Aquila class
- Leone class
- Capitani Romani class - originally classified esploratori oceanici (ocean scouts), then re-rated light cruisers

=== Romanian Navy ===
- Aquila class

=== Royal Navy ===
- Sentinel class
- Adventure class
- Forward class
- Pathfinder class
- Boadicea class
- Blonde class
- Active class

=== United States Navy ===
- List of cruisers of the United States Navy § Scout cruisers (SCR, SC, CS)
  - Chester class – later re-classified as light cruisers (CL)
  - The first three Omaha-class ships were also designated "scout cruisers" (CS) when ordered, but in 1920, before any were launched, the Navy revised its classification system and they - and the Chesters - became light cruisers (CL).

== See also ==
- Destroyer leader
- Flotilla leader
