= Preview =

Preview may refer to:

== Arts and entertainment ==
=== Film and television ===
- Preview (subscription service), in the United States 1980–1986
- Test screening, a showing of a film or TV show before general release in order to gauge audience reaction
- Film screening, a special showing as part of a film's production and release cycle
- Trailer (promotion) or preview, an advertisement for a future film
- "Previews" (Smash), a 2012 TV episode
- "Un Preview" ('A Preview'), a 2023 song by Bad Bunny

=== Music ===
- The Preview (EP), by Chiddy Bang, 2010
- DJ Drama Presents: The Preview, a 2008 mixtape by Ludacris and DJ Drama
- "Preview", the unlisted final track on Built to Spill's 1994 album There's Nothing Wrong with Love

=== Other ===
- Preview (theatre), a public performance of a theatrical show before the official opening
- Preview (comics), a Marvel Comics character
- Preview (magazine), a Filipino fashion and lifestyle magazine

== Computing ==
- Preview (computing), a computing function to display something before it is produced in final form
- Preview (macOS), the built-in image viewer and PDF viewer of the macOS operating system
- Preview in the software release life cycle

== See also ==
- Foresight (disambiguation)
- Precognition
