= HMS Foresight =

Several ships of the Royal Navy have been named HMS Foresight:

- English ship Foresight (1570), a prototype "race-built" galleon of 1570, broken up in 1604
- English ship Foresight (1650), a 40-gun fourth-rate ship of 1650
- HMS Foresight (1904), a Forward-class scout cruiser that served in World War I
- HMS Foresight (H68), an F-class destroyer sunk in World War II
