= Foresight =

Foresight most commonly refers to:

- Foresight (psychology), the ability to predict or plan for the future
- Mental time travel or episodic foresight, the ability to reconstruct events from the past and imagine future events
- Precognition, a claimed psychic ability to see events in the future

Foresight or fore sight may also refer to:

- Foresight (forecasting journal), a publication on business forecasting, by the International Institute of Forecasters
- Foresight (futures studies), European planning mechanism for public policy
- Foresight (futures studies journal), an international bimonthly journal founded 1999
- Fore sight (surveying), short for "fore sight reading", a reading from a leveling staff when using a surveyor's level
- Foresight Institute, an American nonprofit organization studying molecular nanotechnology
- Foresight Linux, computer operating system
- Foresight magazine, a Japanese magazine published monthly by Shinchosha
- Chanting the Light of Foresight, a saxophone composition by Terry Riley
- Corporate foresight, a set of practices and capabilities of a firm
- HMS Foresight, various ships of the British Royal Navy

Foresee may also refer to:

- Foresee, a brand name of Lexar
