= HMS Forward (1904) =

Royal Navy Forward-class scout cruiser

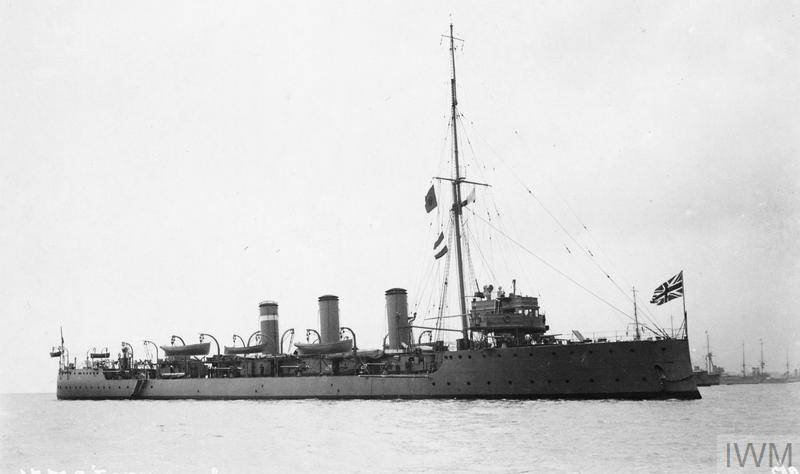
- Scout cruiser HMS Forward, photograph by Ernest Hopkins of Southsea

History

United Kingdom
- Name: Forward
- Builder: Fairfield Shipbuilding and Engineering Company, Govan
- Laid down: 22 October 1903
- Launched: 27 August 1904
- Commissioned: 22 September 1905
- Fate: Sold for scrap, 27 July 1921

General characteristics (as built)
- Class & type: Forward-class scout cruiser
- Displacement: 2,850 long tons (2,896 t)
- Length: 365 ft (111.3 m) (p/p)
- Beam: 39 ft 2 in (11.9 m)
- Draught: 14 ft 3 in (4.3 m)
- Installed power: 16,500 ihp (12,300 kW); 12 Thornycroft boilers
- Propulsion: 2 Shafts, 2 triple-expansion steam engines
- Speed: 25 knots (46 km/h; 29 mph)
- Range: 3,400 nmi (6,300 km; 3,900 mi) at 10 knots (19 km/h; 12 mph)
- Complement: 289
- Armament: 10 × QF 12-pdr 3 in (76 mm) guns; 8 × QF 3-pdr (47 mm) guns; 2 × 18 in (450 mm) torpedo tubes
- Armour: Waterline belt: 2 in (51 mm); Deck: 0.625–1.125 in (15.9–28.6 mm); Conning tower: 3 in (76 mm)

HMS Forward was the name ship of her class of two scout cruisers built for the Royal Navy in the first decade of the 20th century. The ship was in reserve for most of the first decade of her existence. After the beginning of the First World War in August 1914, she was assigned to coastal defence duties on the East Coast of England. Forward was present when the Germans bombarded Hartlepool in mid-December 1914, but played no significant role in the battle. The ship was sent to the Mediterranean in mid-1915 and was then assigned to the Aegean Sea a year later, together with her sister ship, Foresight, and remained there until the end of the war. After returning home in 1919, she was sold for scrap in 1921.

== Design and description ==
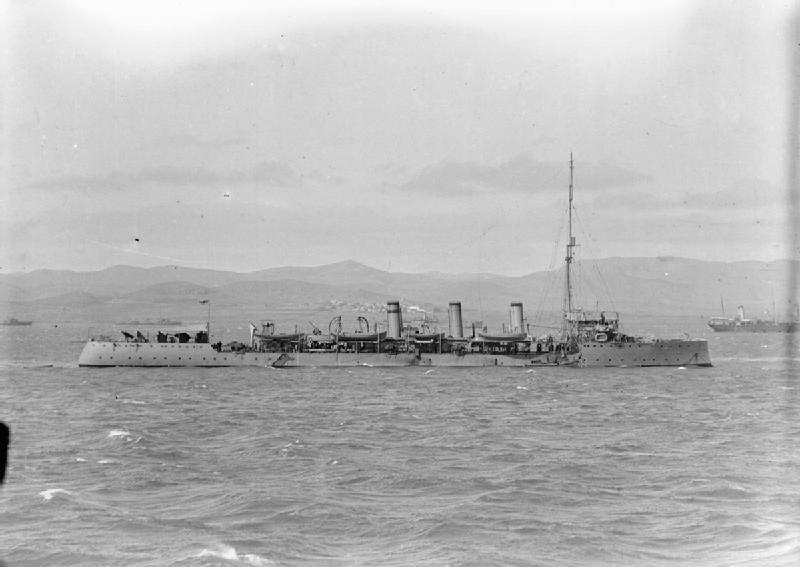
HMS Forward

The Forward-class ships were one of four classes of scout cruisers ordered by the Admiralty in 1902–1903 and 1903–1904 Naval Programmes. These ships were intended to work with destroyer flotillas, leading their torpedo attacks and backing them up when attacked by other destroyers, although they quickly became less useful as destroyer speeds increased before the First World War. They had a length between perpendiculars of 365 feet (111.3 m), a beam of 39 feet 2 inches (11.9 m) and a draught of 14 feet 3 inches (4.3 m). The ships displaced 2,850 long tons (2,896 t) at normal load and 3,100 long tons (3,150 t) at deep load. Their crew consisted of 289 officers and ratings.

The ships were powered by a pair of three-cylinder triple-expansion steam engines, each driving one shaft, using steam provided by a dozen Thornycroft boilers. The engines were designed to produce a total of 16,500 indicated horsepower (12,300 kW) which was intended to give a maximum speed of 25 knots (46 km/h; 29 mph). When Forward ran her sea trials, she reached a speed of 25.2 knots (46.7 km/h; 29.0 mph) from 15,018 ihp (11,199 kW) for eight hours. The Forward-class cruisers carried enough coal to give them a range of 3,400 nautical miles (6,300 km; 3,900 mi) at 10 knots (19 km/h; 12 mph).

The main armament of the Forward class consisted of ten quick-firing (QF) 12-pounder 3 in (76 mm) 18-cwt guns. (Note: "Cwt" is the abbreviation for hundredweight, 18 cwt referring to the weight of the gun.) Three guns were mounted abreast on the forecastle and the quarterdeck, with the remaining four guns positioned port and starboard amidships. They also carried eight 3-pounder Hotchkiss guns and two above-water 18-inch (450 mm) torpedo tubes, one on each broadside. The ships' protective deck armour ranged in thickness from 0.625 to 1.125 inches (16 to 29 mm) and the conning tower had armour 3 inches (76 mm) inches thick. They had a waterline belt 2 inches (51 mm) thick abreast machinery spaces.

== Construction and career ==
Forward was laid down on 22 October 1903 by Fairfield Shipbuilding and Engineering Company in their Govan shipyard. She was launched on 27 August 1904 and completed on 22 August 1905. Not long after completion, two additional 12-pounder guns were added and the 3-pounder guns were replaced with six QF 6-pounder Hotchkiss guns. The ship was in initially in reserve until she was assigned to the Channel Fleet in 1907. Forward became leader of the 2nd Destroyer Flotilla in early 1909, joined the 4th Destroyer Flotilla in October 1909, the 3rd Destroyer Flotilla in the Nore Command in 1910, becoming its leader in June 1913. About 1911–1912, her main guns were replaced by nine 4-inch (102 mm) guns, arranged four on each broadside and the remaining gun on the quarterdeck. At the start of the war she was part of the 9th Destroyer Flotilla, on the Shetland Patrol.

In 1914 she was transferred to the 7th Destroyer Flotilla on the Humber and rejoined the 9th Flotilla, now based in Hartlepool, under the command of Captain Alan Brown, who was also the captain of the scout cruiser HMS Patrol. On 15 December 1914 Forward, Patrol and the 3rd Division of the 9th Flotilla were in Hartlepool, while the 4th Division was patrolling off Whitby. On the morning of 16 December the Germans bombarded Hartlepool, led by the battlecruisers Seydlitz and Moltke and the armoured cruiser Blücher. Hartlepool was a tidal harbour, and at low tide it was difficult for the cruisers to get out to sea. That morning the destroyers HMS Doon, HMS Waveney, HMS Moy and HMS Test had been sent out at 05:30, and had reported that the tide was very low and the swell outside the harbour was very high. Brown decided that it was too dangerous for the cruisers and the submarine C9 to go out on patrol.

At 08:10, the German ships appeared off Hartlepool and opened fire on the town. Their initial targets were the two gun emplacements that protected the harbour, but they soon opened fire on the docks and harbour entrance. Because she already had steam up, Patrol was able to leave harbour, Forward did not and was trying to raise steam during the entire battle. When she did finally get out of Hartlepool, the German battlecruisers had already turned east to make their escape. By the time that Forward exited the harbour, they were out of sight.

After the raid Forward was sent to the 7th Destroyer Flotilla in the Humber. In May 1915 she was one of five of the seven surviving scout cruisers to make up the 6th Light Cruiser Squadron, whose duties were to guard the east coast against Zeppelin raids. This squadron was soon broken up as newer ships became available, and Forward was sent to the Mediterranean. From July 1916 to the end of the war she served in the Aegean with her sister Foresight. Early in 1919, under the command of Arthur Bedford, Forward rescued members of the Tolstoy family from the evacuation of Odessa, about to be captured by the Bolsheviks. She was sold for scrap in July 1921.

== Bibliography ==
- Chesneau, Roger & Kolesnik, Eugene M., eds. (1979). Conway's All the World's Fighting Ships 1860–1905. Greenwich: Conway Maritime Press. ISBN 0-8317-0302-4.
- Dawson, Lionel (1933). Mediterranean Medley. Rich & Cowan. OCLC 70528972.
- Friedman, Norman (2009). British Destroyers From Earliest Days to the Second World War. Annapolis, Maryland: Naval Institute Press. ISBN 978-1-59114-081-8.
- Friedman, Norman (2011). Naval Weapons of World War One. Barnsley, South Yorkshire, UK: Seaforth. ISBN 978-1-84832-100-7.
- Gardiner, Robert & Gray, Randal, eds. (1985). Conway's All the World's Fighting Ships 1906–1921. Annapolis, Maryland: Naval Institute Press. ISBN 0-85177-245-5.
- Massie, Robert K. (2003). Castles of Steel: Britain, Germany, and the Winning of the Great War at Sea. New York: Random House. ISBN 0-679-45671-6.
- McBride, K. D. (1994). "The Royal Navy 'Scout' Class of 1904–05". Warship International. XXXI (3): 260–281. ISSN 0043-0374.
- Morris, Douglas (1987). Cruisers of the Royal and Commonwealth Navies Since 1879. Liskeard, UK: Maritime Books. ISBN 0-907771-35-1.
