= HMS Tiger (1913) =

Battlecruiser of the Royal Navy

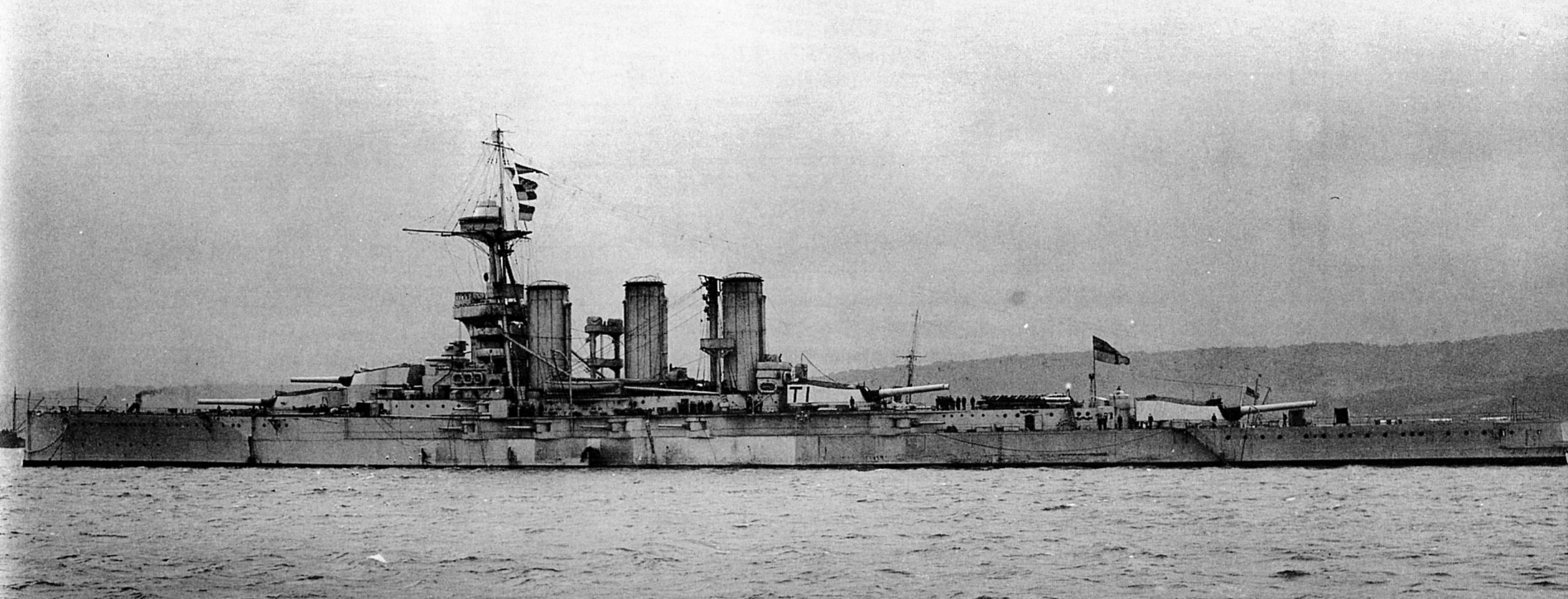
- Tiger at anchor in her 1916–1917 configuration with only a foremast

Class overview
- Operators: (United Kingdom)
- Preceded by: Queen Mary
- Succeeded by: Renown class
- Built: 1912–1914
- In commission: 1914–1931
- Completed: 1
- Scrapped: 1

History

United Kingdom
- Name: Tiger
- Builder: John Brown and Company, Clydebank
- Laid down: 20 June 1912
- Launched: 15 December 1913
- Commissioned: 3 October 1914
- Decommissioned: 15 May 1931
- Fate: Sold for scrap, February 1932

General characteristics
- Type: Battlecruiser
- Displacement: 28,500 long tons (29,000 t) (normal)
- Length: 704 ft (214.6 m) (o/a)
- Beam: 90 ft 6 in (27.6 m)
- Draught: 32 ft 5 in (9.9 m)
- Installed power: 39 × water-tube boilers; 85,000 shp (63,000 kW)
- Propulsion: 4 × shafts; 2 × steam turbine sets
- Speed: 28 knots (52 km/h; 32 mph)
- Complement: 1,112 (September 1914)
- Armament: 4 × twin 13.5 in (343 mm) guns; 12 × single 6 in (152 mm) guns; 2 × single 3 in (76 mm) AA guns; 4 × 21 in (533 mm) torpedo tubes
- Armour: Belt: 3–9 in (76–229 mm); Deck: 1 to 3 in (25 to 76 mm); Barbettes: 8 to 9 in (203 to 229 mm); Casemates: 6 in (152 mm); Turrets: 9 in (229 mm)

HMS Tiger was a battlecruiser built for the Royal Navy during the 1910s. The ship was the most heavily armoured British battlecruiser at the start of the First World War in 1914, but was not yet ready for service. The ship was assigned to the 1st Battlecruiser Squadron (1st BCS) for the duration of the war and participated in the Battle of Dogger Bank in early 1915, though she was still shaking down and did not perform well. Tiger next participated in the Battle of Jutland in 1916, where she was only lightly damaged despite suffering many hits by German shells. Apart from providing distant cover during the Second Battle of Heligoland Bight in 1917, she spent the rest of the war on uneventful patrols in the North Sea.

The ship was the oldest battlecruiser retained by the Royal Navy after the tonnage limits of the Washington Naval Treaty came into effect in 1922. She became a gunnery training ship in 1924 and then joined the Battlecruiser Squadron in 1929 when its flagship, Hood, underwent a lengthy refit. Upon Hood's return to service in 1931, Tiger was decommissioned and sold for scrap in 1932 in accordance with the terms of the London Naval Treaty of 1930.

In his book, The Price of Admiralty, British military historian John Keegan described her as "certainly the most beautiful warship in the world then, and perhaps ever[.]"

== Design and description ==
Tiger was the sole battlecruiser authorised in the 1911–12 Naval Programme. According to naval historian Siegfried Breyer, a sister ship named Leopard was considered in the 1912–13 Programme and deferred until 1914 as a sixth member of the Queen Elizabeth class, but there is no record of any additional battlecruiser being provided for in any naval estimates before 1914.

Tiger had an overall length of 704 feet (214.6 m), a beam of 90 feet 6 inches (27.6 m), and a mean draught of 32 feet 5 inches (9.88 m) at deep load. She normally displaced 28,430 long tons (28,890 t) and 33,260 long tons (33,790 t) at deep load. Although Tiger was only 4 feet (1.2 m) longer and 1 foot 5.5 inches (0.4 m) wider than the previous battlecruiser, Queen Mary, she displaced almost 2,000 long tons (2,000 t) more than the older ship. She had a metacentric height of 6.1 feet (1.9 m) at deep load. In September 1914, her complement consisted of 1,112 officers and ratings; in April 1918, they totalled 1,459.

=== Propulsion ===
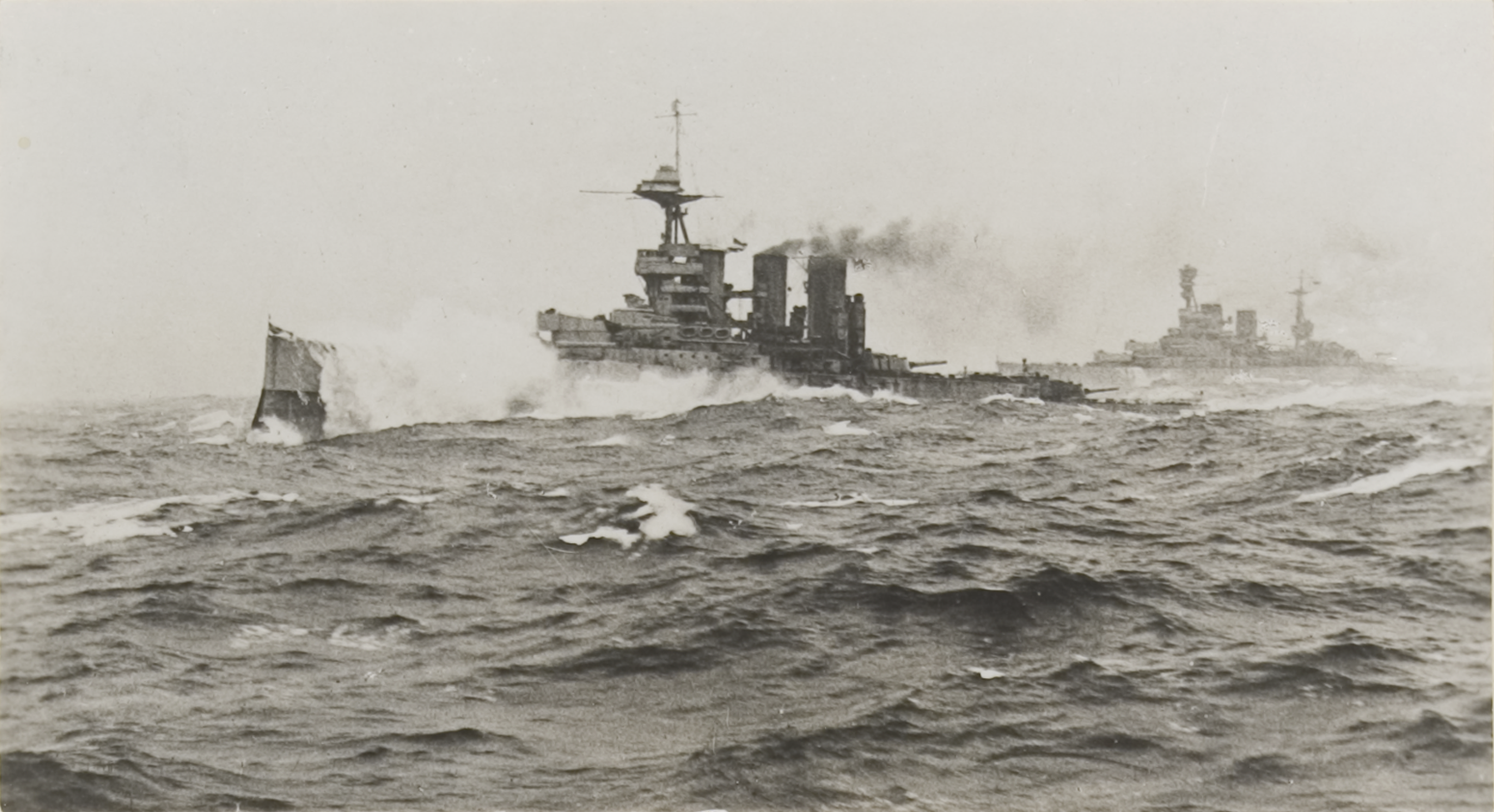
Tiger and Renown underway in heavy seas

Tiger had two paired sets of Brown-Curtis direct-drive steam turbines housed in separate engine-rooms. Each set consisted of intermediate-pressure ahead and high-pressure astern turbines driving the outboard shaft; high-pressure ahead turbines and low-pressure ahead and astern turbines, housed in the same casing, drove the inner shaft. Her three-bladed propellers were 13 feet 6 inches (4.11 m) in diameter. The turbines were powered by 39 Babcock & Wilcox boilers in five boiler rooms at a working pressure of 235 psi (1,620 kPa; 17 kgf/cm^{2}). The turbines were designed to produce a total of 85,000 shaft horsepower (63,000 kW) and a maximum of 108,000 shp (81,000 kW) when forced, but only achieved 104,635 shp (78,026 kW) during her sea trials, although she managed to exceed her maximum designed speed of 28 knots (52 km/h; 32 mph) by over a knot.

The ship's fuel stowage capacity was 3,800 long tons (3,900 t) of fuel oil and 3,340 long tons (3,390 t) of coal, giving a total fuel supply of 7,140 long tons (7,250 t)—much more than Queen Mary's total of 4,800 long tons (4,900 t). The sole (unofficial) figure for Tiger's daily fuel consumption of 1,245 long tons (1,265 t) a day at 24 knots (44 km/h; 28 mph) would have given a maximum endurance of 3,300 nautical miles (6,100 km; 3,800 mi). The equivalent figure for Queen Mary was roughly 2,400 nautical miles (4,400 km; 2,800 mi). Four direct current electric dynamos with a total capacity of 750 kilowatts (1,010 hp) supplied the common ring main at 220 volts.

=== Armament ===
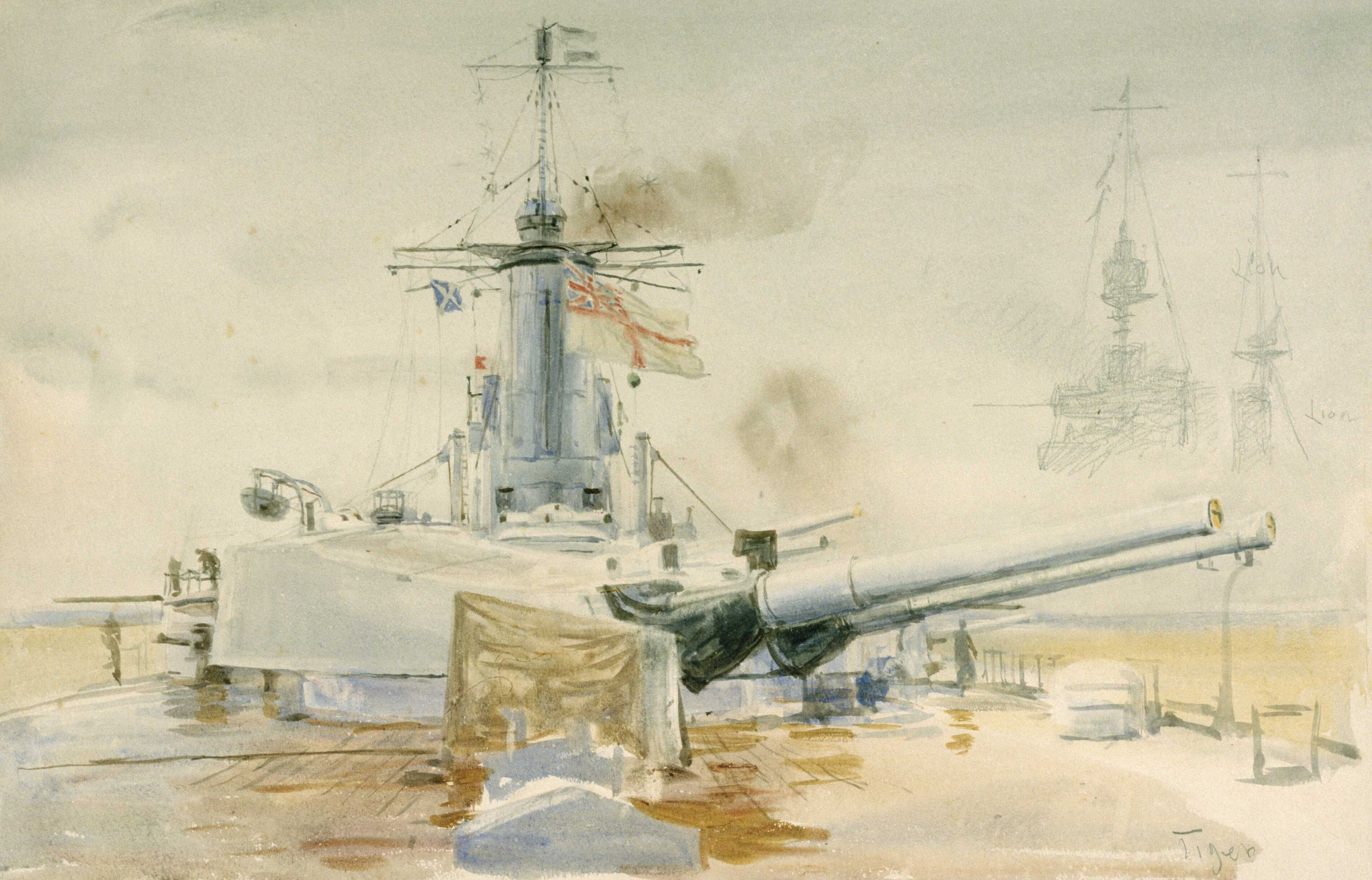
Tiger's armament as painted by William Lionel Wyllie

Tiger mounted eight 45-calibre BL 13.5-inch Mk V guns in four twin hydraulically powered turrets, designated 'A', 'B', 'Q' and 'X' from front to rear. The guns could be depressed to −5° and elevated to +20°, although the directors controlling the turrets were limited to 15° 21' until superelevating prisms were installed before the Battle of Jutland in May 1916 to allow full elevation. They fired 1,400-pound (635 kg) projectiles at a muzzle velocity of 2,491 ft/s (759 m/s); at 20° elevation, this provided a maximum range of 23,740 yards (21,710 m). The rate of fire of these guns was approximately 2 rounds per minute. The ship carried a total of 1040 rounds during wartime for 130 shells per gun.

Her secondary armament consisted of twelve BL 6-inch Mk VII guns in casemates. The guns could depress to −7° and had a maximum elevation of 14°. They fired 100-pound (45 kg) projectiles at a muzzle velocity of approximately 2,770 ft/s (840 m/s); this gave a maximum range of 12,200 yd (11,200 m) at +14° elevation. They were provided with 120 rounds per gun. The ship mounted a pair of QF 3 inch 20 cwt (Note: "Cwt" is the abbreviation for hundredweight, 30 cwt referring to the weight of the gun.) Mk I anti-aircraft guns on high-angle Mark II mounts. The gun had a maximum elevation of +90° and fired a 12.5-pound (5.7 kg) shell at a muzzle velocity of 2,604 ft/s (794 m/s). It had a maximum effective ceiling of 23,000 ft (7,000 m). Originally, Tiger carried 300 rounds per gun, but this was reduced during the war to 150 rounds per gun.

Four 21-inch (530 mm) submerged torpedo tubes were fitted on the beam, one pair port and starboard forward of 'A' barbette and aft of 'X' barbette. The ship carried 20 Mark II*** torpedoes, (Note: The British used asterisks to denote small changes between models.) each with a warhead of 400 pounds (181 kg) of TNT. They had two speed settings which governed their range; at 45 knots (83 km/h; 52 mph), they could reach 4,500 yards (4,100 m), or 10,750 yards (9,830 m) at 29 knots (54 km/h; 33 mph).

=== Fire control ===
The main guns of Tiger were controlled from either of the two fire-control directors. The primary director was in the fore-top on the foremast and the other was mounted on the aft superstructure in the torpedo control tower. Data from 9-foot (2.7 m) rangefinders in the armoured hood above the conning tower and in 'B' and 'Q' turrets was transmitted to the Mk IV Dreyer Fire Control Table located in the transmitting station below the waterline. The observations were then plotted and converted into range and deflection data for use by the director and guns. A Mark VII* Dumaresq in the armoured tower was trained on the target to supply bearing data to one transmitting station for use in plotting and calculations, and a second station was fitted for the ship's secondary armament, although a pair of fire-control directors for those guns, one for each broadside, were not fitted until 1915.

Fire-control technology advanced quickly during the years immediately preceding the First World War and the development of the director firing system was a major advance. This consisted of a fire-control director mounted high in the ship which electrically provided elevation and training angles to the turrets via pointers, which the turret crewmen had only to follow. The director layer fired the guns simultaneously by an electrical trigger which aided in spotting the shell splashes and minimised the effects of the roll on the dispersion of the shells.

During the war, Tiger's rangefinders had increased in number and in size. By the end of the war, 'A' and 'Q' turrets mounted 25-foot (7.6 m) rangefinders while 'X' turret, the armoured hood above the conning tower (also known as the gun control tower), and the torpedo control tower had 15-foot (4.6 m) instruments. A 12-foot (3.7 m) rangefinder was fitted in the fore-top and three 9-foot (2.7 m) instruments were fitted on 'B' turret, the gun control tower and above the compass platform. A high-angle 6-foot-6-inch (2.0 m) rangefinder was mounted above the roof of the fore-top for use by the anti-aircraft guns.

=== Armour ===
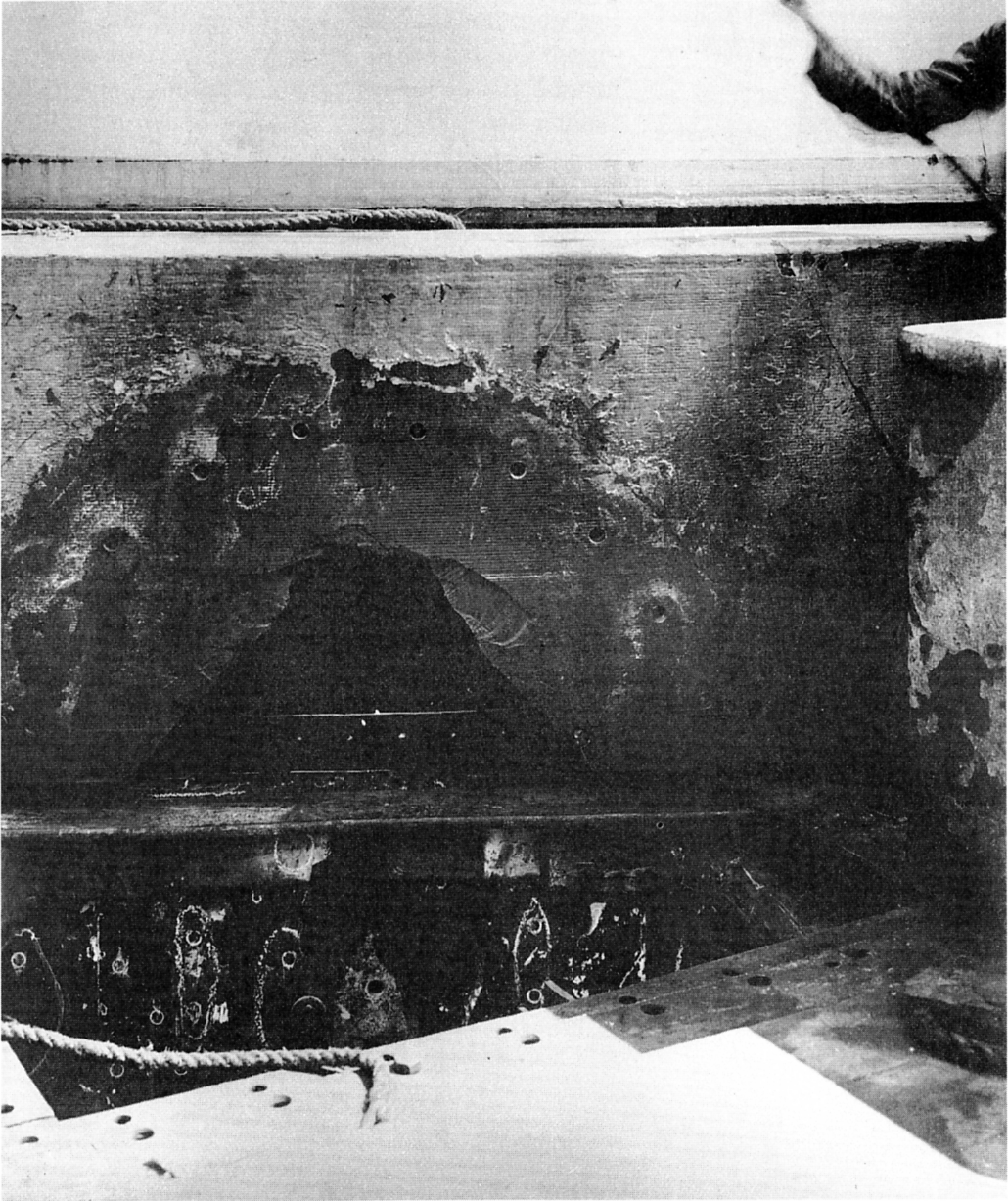
Damage suffered by the barbette of 'X' turret during the Battle of Jutland in 1916

Tiger's armour protection was similar to that of Queen Mary; her waterline belt of Krupp cemented armour measured 9 inches (229 mm) thick amidships. It thinned to four inches towards the ship's ends, but did not reach either the bow or the stern. The depth of the main belt below the waterline was reduced from 36 to 27 inches (914 to 686 mm), although a strake of three-inch armour 3 feet 9 inches (1.14 m) tall was added below the main belt that stretched from the front of 'A' barbette to the rear of 'B' barbette. It was based on that used on the Vickers built Japanese battlecruiser Kongo, the only design influence on Tiger that can be attributed to that ship. (Note: Parkes attributed her general layout to the influence of the Kongo design, but there is no evidence of that in the surviving documentation.)

Like the Lion-class ships and Queen Mary, Tiger was given an upper armour belt with a maximum thickness of six inches over the same length as the thickest part of the waterline armour and thinned to 5 inches (127 mm) abreast the end turrets. Unlike those ships, Tiger had an additional strake of 6-inch armour above the upper belt protecting her secondary armament. Four-inch transverse bulkheads closed off the ends of the armoured citadel. High-tensile steel was used for the protective decks. They generally ranged from 1 to 1.5 inches (25 to 38 mm) in thickness.

The gun turrets had 9-inch front and sides while their roofs were 2.5 to 3.25 inches (64 to 83 mm) thick. The barbettes were protected above the citadel by 8 to 9 inches (203 to 229 mm) of armour, thinning to three to four inches inside the citadel. The main conning tower had a three-inch roof and sides 10 inches (254 mm) thick. The walls of the communication tube were three to four inches thick. The aft conning tower had 6-inch walls and a 3-inch cast steel roof. High-tensile steel torpedo bulkheads 1.5 to 2.5 inches (38 to 64 mm) thick were fitted abreast the magazines and shell rooms. After the Battle of Jutland revealed the ship's vulnerability to plunging shellfire, around 295 long tons (300 t) of additional armour was added to the turret roofs, the decks over the magazines, and the bulkheads separating the 6-inch guns.

== Service history ==
=== First World War ===
Tiger was laid down at the John Brown and Company shipyard in Clydebank on 6 June 1912. She was launched on 15 December 1913 and commissioned into the Royal Navy on 3 October 1914, at the cost of £2,593,100, including armament. The ship was still under construction when the First World War broke out in August 1914. On 3 August 1914, Captain Henry Pelly was appointed to command the incomplete ship. Beatty described Pelly at the time as "a very charming person and, what is more important just now, a very efficient officer".

Tiger was commissioned for the 1st Battlecruiser Squadron (1st BCS) on 3 October. After the Battle of Coronel and the deployment of three battlecruisers to hunt for the German East Asia Squadron in November, Tiger was ordered to cut short her firing trials off Berehaven. Beatty described Tiger to the First Sea Lord, Admiral of the Fleet Lord Fisher of Kilverstone, as "not yet fit to fight. Three out of her four dynamoes are out of action for an indefinite period, and her training is impeded by bad weather, which might continue for many weeks at this time of year, and at present is quite unprepared and inefficient."

==== Battle of Dogger Bank ====
On 23 January 1915, a force of German battlecruisers under the command of Admiral Franz von Hipper sortied to clear the Dogger Bank of any British fishing boats or small craft that might be there to collect intelligence on German movements. However, the British were reading their coded messages and sailed to intercept them with a larger force of British battlecruisers under the command of Admiral Beatty. Contact was initiated at 07:20 (Note: The times used in this article are in UTC, which is one hour behind CET, which is often used in German works.) on the 24th, when the British light cruiser Arethusa spotted the German light cruiser Kolberg. By 07:35, the Germans had spotted Beatty's force and Hipper ordered a turn to the south at 20 knots (37 km/h; 23 mph), believing this would suffice if the ships he saw to his north-west were British battleships and that he could always increase speed to Blücher's maximum speed of 23 knots (43 km/h; 26 mph) if they were British battlecruisers.

Beatty ordered his battlecruisers to make all practicable speed to catch the Germans before they could escape. The leading ships, Lion, Princess Royal and Tiger, were doing 27 knots (50 km/h; 31 mph) in pursuit and Lion opened fire at 08:52 at a range of 20,000 yards (18,000 m). The other ships followed a few minutes later but, hampered by the extreme range and decreasing visibility, they did not score their first hit on Blücher until 09:09. The German battlecruisers opened fire themselves a few minutes later at 09:11, at a range of 18,000 yards (16,000 m), and concentrated their fire on Lion. At 09:35, Beatty signalled "Engage the corresponding ships in the enemy's line", but Captain Pelly, believing that Indomitable was already engaging Blücher, fired at Seydlitz, as did Lion, which left Moltke free to continue attacking Lion without risk.

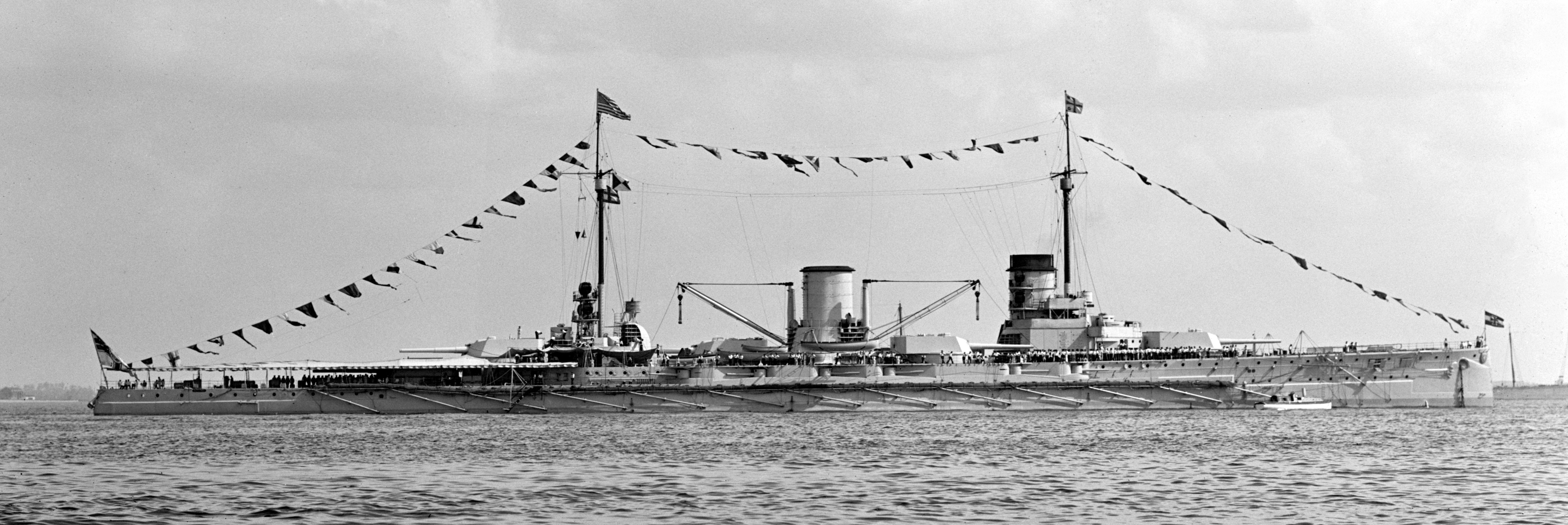
Moltke during a 1912 port visit to the U.S.

In the meantime, Blücher had been heavily damaged by fire from all the other battlecruisers; her speed had dropped to 17 knots (31 km/h; 20 mph) and her steering gear had been jammed. Beatty ordered Indomitable to attack her at 10:48. Six minutes later, Beatty spotted what he thought was a submarine periscope on the starboard bow and ordered an immediate 90° turn to port to avoid the submarine, although he failed to hoist the "Submarine Warning" flag because most of Lion's signal halyards had been shot away. Shortly afterward, Lion lost her remaining dynamo to the rising water which knocked out all remaining light and power. He ordered "Course north-east" at 11:02 to bring his ships back to their pursuit of Hipper. He also hoisted "Attack the rear of the enemy" on the other halyard, although there was no connection between the two signals. Rear-Admiral Sir Gordon Moore, temporarily commanding in New Zealand, thought that the signals meant for him to attack Blücher, which was about 8,000 yards (7,300 m) to the north-east, which he did, turning away from Hipper's main body. Beatty tried to correct the mistake, but he was so far behind the leading battlecruisers that his signals could not be read amidst the smoke and haze.

He transferred his flag to the destroyer Attack at 11:50 and set off in pursuit of his battlecruisers. He caught up to them shortly before Blücher sank and boarded Princess Royal at 12:20. He ordered the pursuit of the German battlecruisers to be resumed, but rescinded the order when it became clear that too much time had been wasted sinking Blücher and Hipper's ships would be able to reach German waters before the British could catch them. Lion was headed home at 10 knots (19 km/h; 12 mph) when the rest of the battlecruisers caught up with her around 12:45.

During the action, Tiger was hit by six German shells, the most significant of which was a 28-centimetre (11 in) shell that burst on the roof of 'Q' turret. Although most of the shell was deflected overboard, fragments penetrated the roof, damaged the left gun's breech mechanism and jammed the training gear, knocking the turret out of action. Ten men were killed during the battle and 11 wounded. Tiger's repairs were completed on 8 February. Like the rest of the battlecruisers, Tiger's own gunnery was rapid, but inaccurate, and she achieved only two hits out of 355 13.5-inch (340 mm) shells fired, scoring one hit each on Seydlitz and Derfflinger. Her performance was noted and commented upon by the senior leadership of the Royal Navy: Lord Fisher criticised Pelly's performance, calling him a "poltroon" and adding "The Tiger's gunnery seems to have been villainously bad on January 24, yet she seems to have had a lot of practice." In a memorandum of 11 February 1915, Beatty explained to Pelly where the latter had misconstrued the standing orders, going through Tiger's part in the battle blow by blow and comparing it to that of other ships. His final paragraph was conciliatory however: "In making these remarks I have no wish to express censure in any form. I realise that a newly-commissioned ship in her first action has many difficulties to contend with, and I am quite ready to make the fullest allowance for them. My chief aim is to ensure that our next action shall be a complete success." The ship was given a refit in December 1915.

==== Battle of Jutland ====
Diagram of the Battle of Jutland showing the major movements

On 31 May 1916, Tiger and the 1st BCS had put to sea with the rest of the Battlecruiser Fleet, under Beatty's overall command, to intercept a sortie by the High Seas Fleet into the North Sea. The British had decoded the German radio messages, and left their bases before the Germans put to sea. Hipper's battlecruisers spotted the Battlecruiser Fleet to their west at 15:20, but Beatty's ships did not see the Germans to their east until 15:30. Two minutes later, Beatty ordered a course change to east-southeast, positioning the British ships to cut off the German's line of retreat, and signalled action stations. Hipper ordered his ships to turn to starboard, away from the British, to assume a south-easterly course, and reduced speed to 18 knots (33 km/h; 21 mph) to allow three light cruisers of the 2nd Scouting Group to catch up. With this turn, Hipper was falling back on the High Seas Fleet, 60 nautical miles (110 km; 69 mi) behind him. Beatty altered course to the east, as he was still too far north to cut Hipper off.

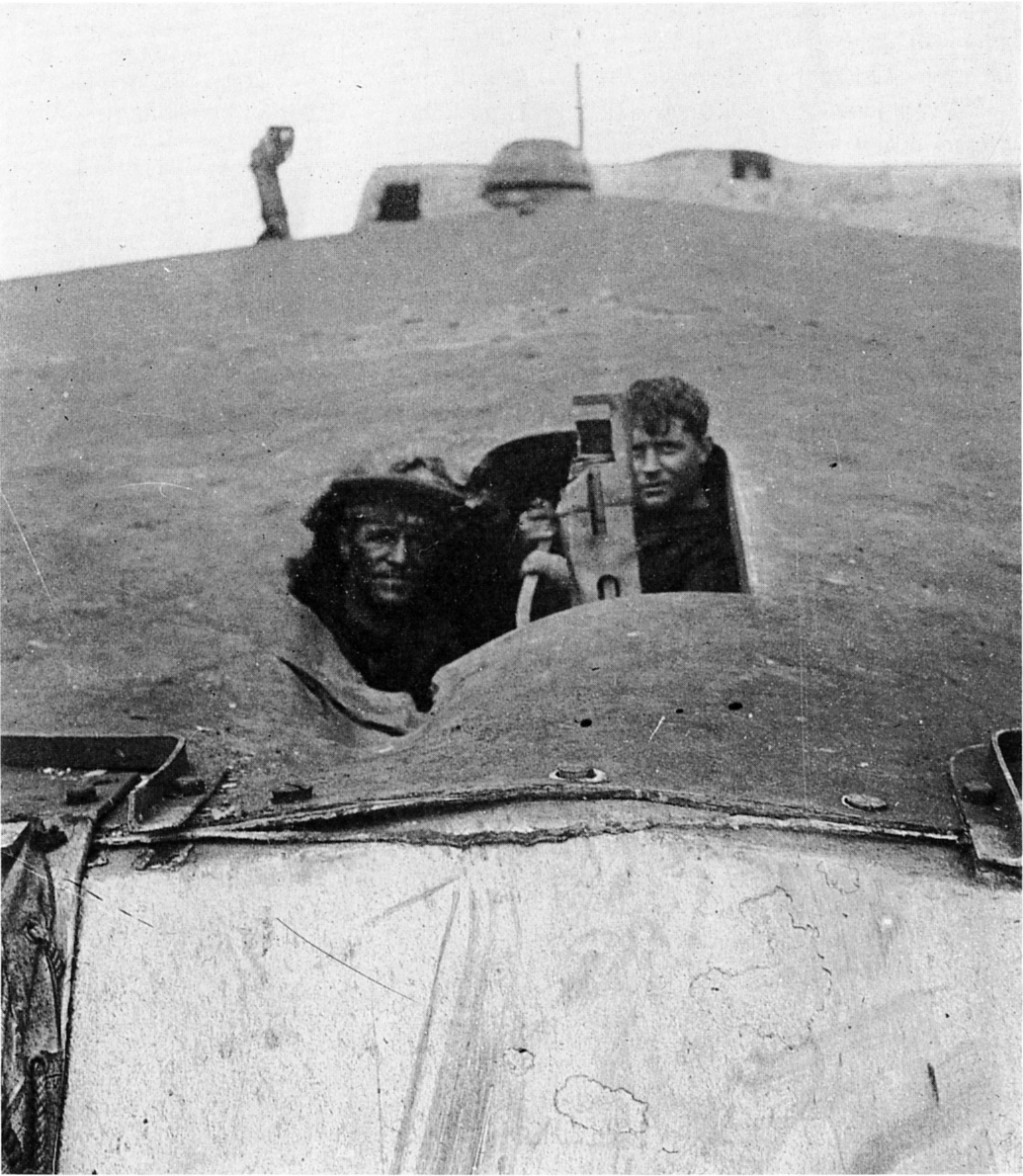
The roof of 'Q' turret after a German 28 cm (11 in) shell hit during the Battle of Jutland

This was later characterised as the "Run to the South" as Beatty changed course to steer east-southeast at 15:45, now paralleling Hipper's course less than 18,000 yards (16,000 m) away. The Germans opened fire first at 15:48, followed by the British. The British ships were still in the process of making their turn as only the two leading ships, Lion and Princess Royal, had steadied on their course when the Germans opened fire. The 1st BCS was echeloned to the right with Tiger in the rear and the furthest to the west, closest to the Germans. Tiger missed Beatty's fire distribution order, as had Queen Mary, and Tiger engaged Moltke, instead of Seydlitz as Beatty intended. The German fire was accurate from the start, with Tiger hit six times by Moltke within the first seven minutes; although two of these hits temporarily disabled both 'Q' and 'X' turrets, she was not seriously damaged. By 15:54, the range was down to 12,900 yards (11,800 m); Beatty ordered a course change two points to starboard to open up the range at 15:57. Around 16:00, Indefatigable was hit around the rear turret by two or three shells from Von der Tann. She fell out of formation to starboard and started sinking toward the stern and listing to port. Her magazines exploded at 16:03 after more hits destroying the ship with the loss of all hands but three. The range gradually increased until the distance between the British and German ships was too great for accurate fire, so Beatty altered course four points to port between 16:12 and 16:15 to close the range. By 16:25, the range was down to 14,400 yards (13,200 m) and Beatty turned two points to starboard to open the range again. Around this time, Queen Mary was hit multiple times in quick succession and her forward magazines exploded. Tiger, following in Queen Mary's wake at a distance of only 500 yards (460 m), had to put her helm hard-a-starboard to avoid colliding with the wreckage. At 16:30, the light cruiser Southampton, scouting in front of Beatty's ships, spotted the lead elements of the High Seas Fleet coming north at top speed. Three minutes later, she sighted the topmasts of Vice-Admiral Reinhard Scheer's battleships, but did not report this for another five minutes. Beatty continued south for another two minutes to confirm the sighting before ordering his force to turn north. By this time, Tiger had been hit a total of 17 times, all but one fired by Moltke, but she remained fit to fight.

The German battlecruisers made their own turn north in pursuit, but Beatty's ships maintained full speed, and gradually moved out of range. The British battlecruisers turned north, then north-east, to try to rendezvous with the main body of the Grand Fleet, and at 17:40 opened fire again on their German counterparts. The setting sun blinded the German gunners and they could not make out the British ships and turned away to the north-east at 17:47. Beatty gradually turned toward the east so his ships could cover the Grand Fleet as it deployed into battle formation, but he mistimed his manoeuvre and forced the leading British division further from the Germans. By 18:35, Beatty was following the 3rd BCS as they were leading the Grand Fleet east-southeast, and continuing to engage Hipper's battlecruisers to their south-west. A few minutes earlier, Scheer had ordered a simultaneous 180° starboard turn, and Beatty lost sight of them in the haze. At 18:44, Beatty turned his ships south-east, then south-southeast four minutes later, to find Hipper's force. He then ordered the two surviving ships of the 3rd BCS to take position astern of New Zealand, while slowing to 18 knots (33 km/h; 21 mph) and altering course to the south to stay close to the Grand Fleet. At this moment, Lion's gyrocompass failed, and she—followed by the rest of the battlecruisers—made a complete circle before her steering was brought back under control. At 18:55, Scheer ordered another 180° turn, which put the German ships on a converging course again with the Grand Fleet. However, the British had altered course to the south, allowing the Grand Fleet to cross Scheer's "T" and inflict damage on the leading German ships. Scheer ordered yet another 180° turn at 19:13, and successfully extricated the High Seas Fleet from the trap his manoeuvring caused.

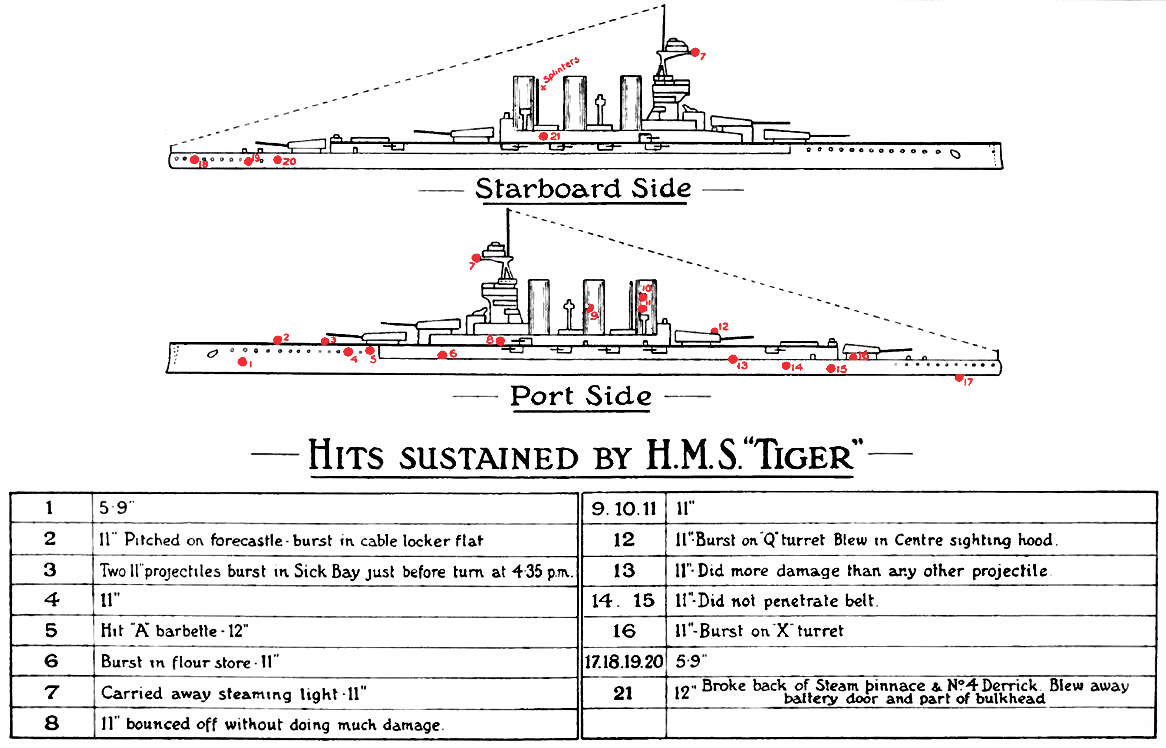
An early, and not necessarily reliable, diagram showing shell hits sustained at Jutland

The British lost sight of the Germans until Castor spotted smoke to the west-northwest at 20:05, then identified and engaged several German torpedo boats. On hearing the sound of gunfire, Beatty ordered his ships west, and spotted the German battlecruisers only 8,500 yards (7,800 m) away. Inflexible opened fire at 20:20, followed almost immediately by the rest of the battlecruisers. Shortly after 8:30, the pre-dreadnought battleships of Rear Admiral Franz Mauve's II Battle Squadron were spotted. The British battlecruisers and German pre-dreadnoughts exchanged fire; the Germans fired only a few times before turning away to the west because of poor visibility and the more accurate British gunnery, and disappeared into the mist around 20:40. Beatty's battlecruisers sailed south-southeast, ahead of both the Grand Fleet and the High Seas Fleet, until the order to reverse course for home was given at 02:55.

Tiger and the rest of the battlecruisers reached Rosyth Dockyard in Scotland on the morning of 2 June. Docked the next day for repairs which took until 1 July, she was the first of the "Splendid Cats" to be repaired. Tiger was hit a total of 18 times during the battle, mostly by shells fired by Moltke, suffering 24 men killed and 46 wounded. The battlecruiser fired 303 shells from her main guns during the battle and is credited with one hit on Moltke and two on Von der Tann. The ship also fired 136 rounds from her 6-inch guns at the light cruiser Wiesbaden and German destroyers.

==== Post-Jutland service ====
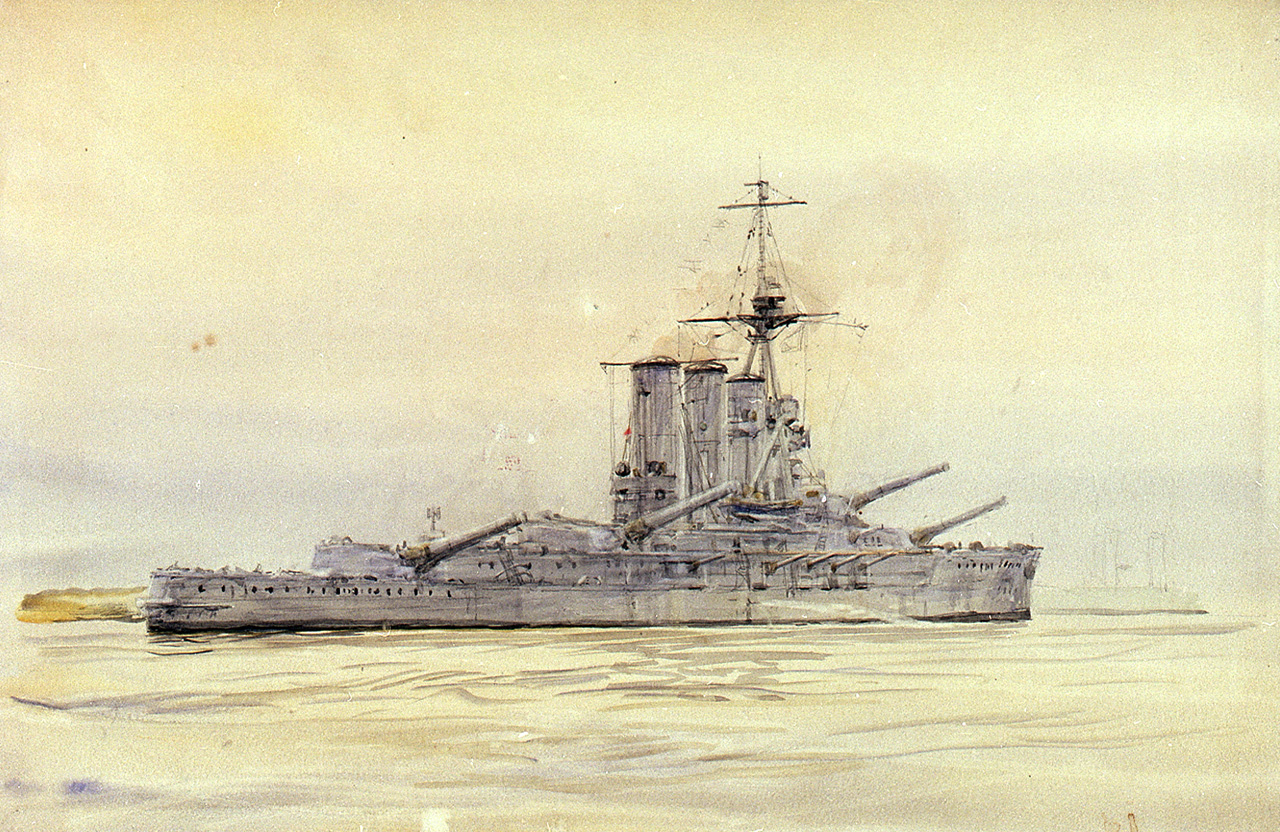
Tiger as painted by William Lionel Wyllie after the Battle of Jutland

After her repairs were completed, Tiger served as the temporary flagship of the 1st Battlecruiser Squadron while Lion was under repair. In the meantime, on the evening of 18 August the Grand Fleet put to sea in response to a message deciphered by Room 40 which indicated that the High Seas Fleet, less the II Squadron, would be leaving harbour that night. The German objective was to bombard Sunderland on the 19th, with extensive reconnaissance provided by airships and submarines. The Grand Fleet sailed with 29 dreadnought battleships and six battlecruisers, including Tiger. Throughout the 19th, Jellicoe and Scheer received conflicting intelligence, with the result that having reached its rendezvous in the North Sea, the Grand Fleet steered north in the erroneous belief it had entered a minefield before turning south again. Scheer steered south-eastward pursuing a lone British battle squadron reported by an airship, which was in fact the Harwich Force under Commodore Tyrwhitt. Having realised their mistake, the Germans then steered for home. The only contact came in the evening when Tyrwhitt sighted the High Seas Fleet, but he was unable to achieve an advantageous attack position before dark, and broke off contact. Both the British and the German fleets returned home; the British had lost two cruisers to submarine attacks, and a German dreadnought had been damaged by a torpedo.

The ship received a lengthy refit from 10 November 1916 to 29 January 1917 at Rosyth where her deck and turret roof armour were reinforced and additional rangefinders were added over her conning tower and the rear of 'X' turret. For the remainder of the war, Tiger uneventfully patrolled the North Sea, as both fleets were essentially forbidden to risk any more losses. She provided support for British light forces involved in the Second Battle of Heligoland Bight on 17 November 1917, but never came within range of any German forces. The same year saw her undergo a minor refit during which a flying-off platform for a Sopwith Camel was mounted on 'Q' turret and a searchlight platform was added to her third funnel. She underwent a more extensive refit in 1918 which saw her topmast shifted to the top of the derrick-stump and a more substantial observation platform added to the foremast. Some of her short rangefinders were replaced by longer ones as well.

=== Post-war ===
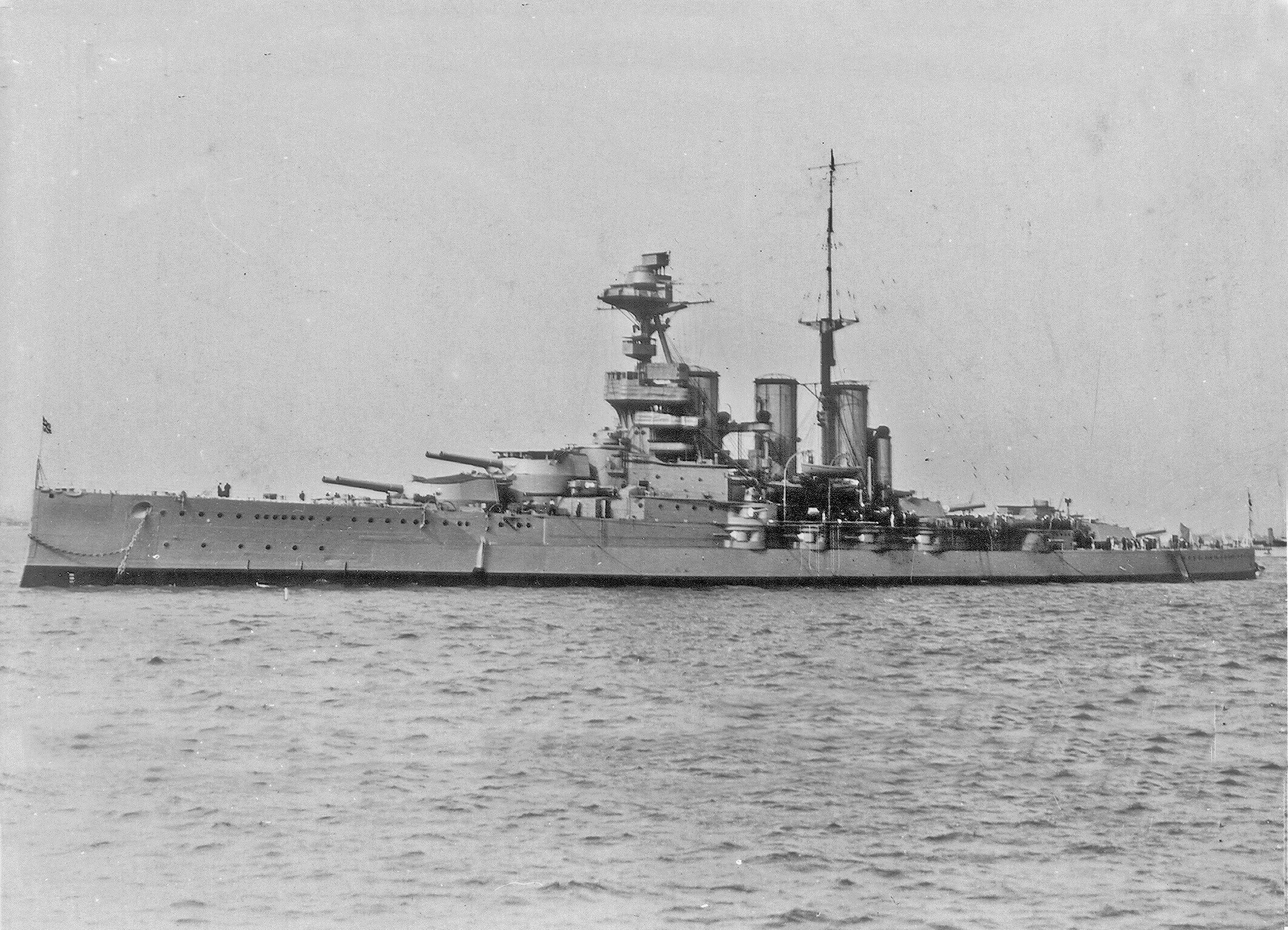
Tiger after her 1918 refit

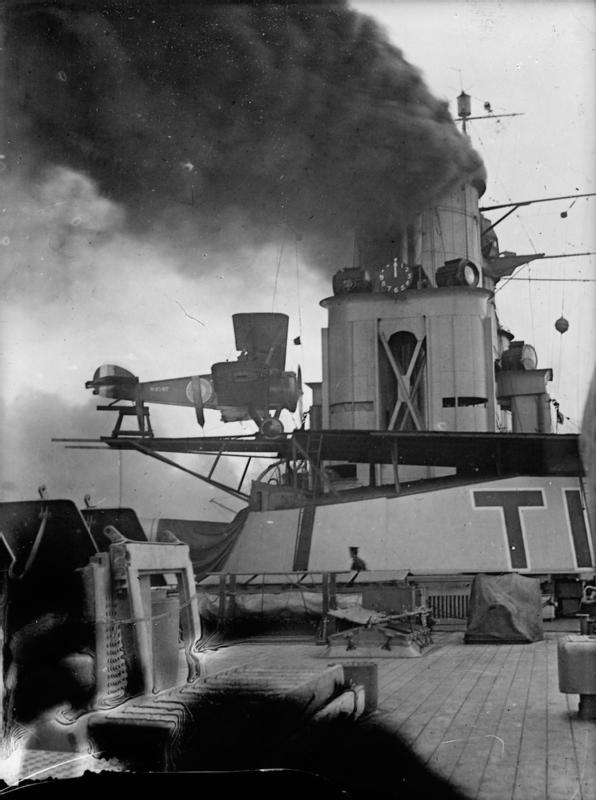
Sopwith Camel ready for launch from 'Q' turret

Tiger remained in service with the Royal Navy after the Armistice with Germany and she had a flying-off platform added on 'B' turret's roof in 1919. The ship collided with the battleship Royal Sovereign in late 1920 while assigned to the Atlantic Fleet. Tiger survived the culling of older capital ships following the Washington Naval Treaty, although she was placed in reserve on 22 August 1921. The ship was refitted in March 1922 with a 25-foot (7.6 m) rangefinder fitted on 'X' turret, her original pair of 3-inch AA guns replaced by four 4-inch (102 mm) guns, and the flying-off platform on 'Q' turret was removed. On 14 February 1924, Tiger was recommissioned and became a seagoing training ship, a role she served in throughout the 1920s. Her last major period of activity came in 1929, when Hood went into dockyard hands for refit. While Hood was out of commission, Tiger returned to active service to keep the Royal Navy's three-ship Battlecruiser Squadron (normally made up of Hood plus the smaller Renown and Repulse) up to strength. Although by the 1930s, Tiger was still in reasonable condition, the decision was taken to discard her following the London Naval Conference 1930 as part of an overall reduction in world battleship fleets. Under the command of Captain Kenneth Dewar in 1928 to 1929, her final commander was Arthur Bedford, and she remained in service with the fleet until Hood came out of refit in early 1931, at which time she was taken out of commission in accordance with the terms of the London Naval Treaty.

Tiger took the cheers of the Atlantic Fleet on 30 March 1931 at Devonport. She paid off on 15 May 1931 at Rosyth, before being sold to Thos. W. Ward of Inverkeithing for breaking up in February 1932.

== Bibliography ==
- Beatty, David (1989). Ranft, Bryan McL. (ed.). The Beatty Papers. Vol. I. Navy Records Society. ISBN 0-85967-807-5.
- Breyer, Siegfried (1973). Battleships and Battle Cruisers, 1905–1970. Doubleday & Company Inc. ISBN 0-385-07247-3.
- Brooks, John (2005). Dreadnought Gunnery and the Battle of Jutland: The Question of Fire Control. Naval Policy and History. Vol. 32. Routledge. ISBN 0-415-40788-5.
- Brown, David K. (1999). The Grand Fleet: Warship Design and Development 1906–1922. Naval Institute Press. ISBN 1-55750-315-X.
- Burt, R. A. (2012a). British Battleships, 1919–1939 (2nd ed.). Naval Institute Press. ISBN 978-1-59114-052-8.
- Burt, R. A. (2012b). British Battleships of World War One (2nd ed.). Naval Institute Press. ISBN 978-1-59114-053-5.
- Campbell, N. J. M. (1978). Battle Cruisers. Warship Special. Vol. 1. Conway Maritime Press. ISBN 0-85177-130-0.
- Campbell, John (1986). Jutland: An Analysis of the Fighting. Naval Institute Press. ISBN 0-87021-324-5.
- Fisher, John (1959). Marder, Arthur Jacob (ed.). Fear God and Dread Nought: Restoration, Abdication, and Last Years, 1914–1920. Vol. III. Jonathan Cape.
- Friedman, Norman (2011). Naval Weapons of World War One: Guns, Torpedoes, Mines and ASW Weapons of All Nations; An Illustrated Directory. Barnsley, UK: Seaforth Publishing. ISBN 978-1-84832-100-7.
- Goldrick, James (2015). Before Jutland: The Naval War in Northern European Waters, August 1914-February 1915. Naval Institution Press. ISBN 978-1-59114-349-9.
- Keegan, John (1990). The Price of Admiralty: The Evolution of Naval Warfare. New York: Penguin Books. ISBN 0-14-009650-7.
- Marder, Arthur J. (1978). From the Dreadnought to Scapa Flow, The Royal Navy in the Fisher Era, 1904–1919. Vol. III: Jutland and After, May 1916 – December 1916 (Second ed.). Oxford University Press. ISBN 0-19-215841-4.
- Massie, Robert K. (2003). Castles of Steel: Britain, Germany, and the Winning of the Great War at Sea. Random House. ISBN 0-679-45671-6.
- Monograph No. 33: Home Waters Part VII: From June 1916 to November 1916 (PDF). Naval Staff Monographs (Historical). Vol. XVII. Naval Staff, Training and Staff Duties Division. 1927.
- Newbolt, Henry (1996) [1931]. Naval Operations. History of the Great War Based on Official Documents. Vol. V. Battery Press. ISBN 0-89839-255-1.
- Newman, Brian (2019). "Battlecruiser Tiger: The Arrangement of the Main Engines". In Jordan, John (ed.). Warship 2019. Osprey Publishing. pp. 69–80. ISBN 978-1-4728-3595-6.
- Parkes, Oscar (1990) [1966]. British Battleships, Warrior 1860 to Vanguard 1950: A History of Design, Construction, and Armament (New & rev. ed.). Naval Institute Press. ISBN 1-55750-075-4.
- Roberts, John (1997). Battlecruisers. Naval Institute Press. ISBN 1-55750-068-1.
- Roberts, John Arthur (1978). "The Design and Construction of the Battlecruiser Tiger". In Preston, Antony (ed.). Warship II. Conway Maritime Press. pp. 2–13, 88–95. ISBN 0-85177-149-1.
- Tarrant, V. E. (1999) [1995]. Jutland: The German Perspective: A New View of the Great Battle, 31 May 1916. Brockhampton Press. ISBN 1-86019-917-8.
