= Herbert Fitzherbert =

Royal Navy admiral (1885–1958)

Admiral Sir Herbert Fitzherbert KCIE CB CMG
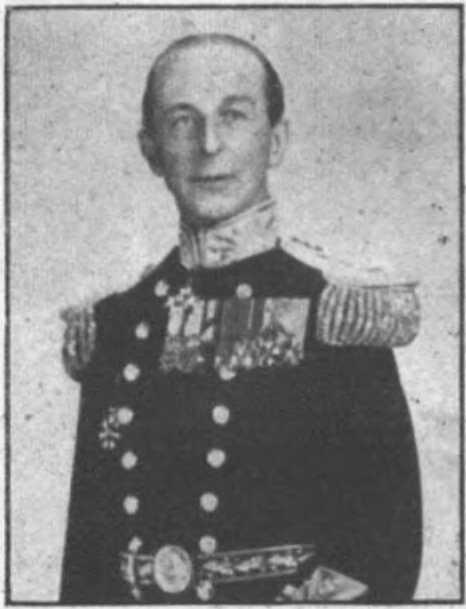
- Vice Admiral Herbert Fitzherbert
- Born: 10 August 1885; Kingswear, Totnes, Devon
- Died: 30 October 1958 (aged 73)
- Military career
- Allegiance: United Kingdom; British India
- Branch: Royal Navy; Royal Indian Navy
- Service years: 1900–1943
- Rank: Admiral
- Commands: HMS Coventry (1926); HMS Victory (1932); HMS Devonshire (1934); Flag Officer Commanding, Royal Indian Navy (1937); Flag Officer-in-Charge, Tunisia (1943)
- Conflicts: First World War; Second World War
- Awards: KCIE (1941); CB (1937); CMG (1919)

Admiral Sir Herbert Fitzherbert, KCIE, CB, CMG (10 August 1885 – 30 October 1958) was a Royal Navy admiral who served as the third Flag Officer Commanding, Royal Indian Navy, from 1937 to 1943.

== Life and career ==
Fitzherbert was born at Kingswear, Totnes, Devon, the son of Samuel Wyndham Fitzherbert. He joined the Royal Navy in 1900 and was educated aboard the cadet training ship HMS Britannia. He was commissioned as an acting Sub-Lieutenant in 1905, and was confirmed as a Sub-Lieutenant the following year. He was promoted to Lieutenant in 1907. During the First World War, he served as a Flag Lieutenant to Admiral of the Fleet Sir John Jellicoe (later the Earl Jellicoe) at the Battle of Jutland, for which he was appointed a CMG in 1919. He was also awarded the Legion d'Honneur and the Russian Order of St. Anne for his service during the battle. Fitzherbert was promoted to Commander in 1917 and to Captain in 1924.

From 1926 to 1928, he commanded the cruiser HMS Coventry, also serving as the chief staff officer to the rear-admiral (destroyers) commanding destroyer flotillas of the Mediterranean Fleet. He then served as the naval assistant to the First Sea Lord, Sir Frederick Field, from 1929 to 1930. From 1931 to 1932, he took the Imperial Defense Course at the Imperial Defence College, and was then appointed as commanding officer of the Signal School at Portsmouth aboard HMS Victory, holding the position until 1934. He then commanded the cruiser HMS Devonshire in the Mediterranean until 1936, when he received a promotion to rear-admiral. Fitzherbert was appointed a CB in the 1937 Coronation Honours and after attending the Senior Officers' War Course at Greenwich, was appointed flag officer commanding, Royal Indian Navy, in November of that year.

He was promoted to vice-admiral in 1939, was knighted with the KCIE in 1941 and retired in 1943. He was subsequently appointed as the flag officer in charge, Tunisia, and served there until 1944. In 1946, he was promoted to admiral on the retired list and died in 1958, aged 73.

He married Rachel Hanbury, and the couple had one son.

Military offices
Preceded by Arthur Bedford	Commander-in-Chief, Royal Indian Navy; 1937–1943	Succeeded by John Godfrey
