= Arthur Bedford =

Royal Navy Vice-Admiral

Vice-Admiral Arthur Bedford CB CSI
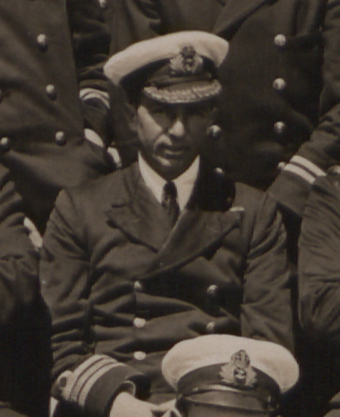
- Bedford photographed aboard HMS Kent, 1915
- Born: 2 August 1881; Greenwich, Kent, England
- Died: 5 December 1949 (aged 68); HMS Newcastle, Maltese Waters
- Military career
- Allegiance: United Kingdom; British India
- Branch: Royal Navy; Royal Indian Navy
- Service years: 1895–1945
- Rank: Vice-Admiral
- Commands: HMS Kent; HMS Forward; HMS Tiger; Royal Indian Navy
- Conflicts: World War I * Battle of the Falkland Islands (1914); World War II
- Awards: Companion of the Order of the Bath; Companion of the Order of the Star of India

Vice-Admiral Arthur Edward Frederick Bedford, CB, CSI (2 August 1881 – 5 December 1949) was a Royal Navy officer. He served in HMS Kent at the Battle of the Falkland Islands of 1914 and rose to command the Royal Indian Navy from 1934 to 1937, when he retired. A year later he rejoined the colours and served until the end of the Second World War.

== Early life ==
The son of Admiral Sir Frederick Bedford (1838–1913), by his marriage to Ethel Turner, daughter of E. R. Turner of Ipswich, Bedford was educated at Dartmouth on the cadet ship HMS Britannia (the precursor of the Britannia Royal Naval College) and joined the Royal Navy as a Midshipman in 1895. His father had previously commanded HMS Britannia from 1886 to 1889.

Bedford came of a long naval tradition. His grandfather, Vice-Admiral Edward James Bedford (1810–1887), had also been a Royal Navy officer, and was himself the son of Lieutenant Frederick Bedford RN (born 1779), who lost a leg in a naval action near the Île d'Yeu in 1801. His great-grandmother, Mary Spearing, wife of Frederick Bedford, was the daughter of Lieutenant George Spearing RN (1728–1825), who when he died in his 97th year was Senior Lieutenant of the Royal Navy.

His brother Denham Maurice Turner Bedford (1886–1974) followed him into HMS Britannia and the Royal Navy, rising to the rank of Rear Admiral.

== Career ==
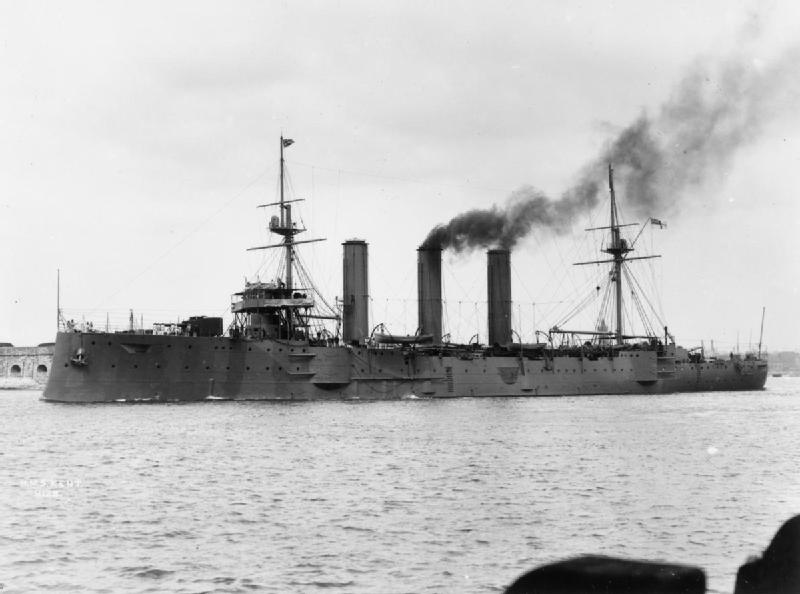
HMS Kent

SMS Nürnberg, sunk by Kent in 1914

As a midshipman, Bedford was posted to the protected cruiser HMS Charybdis in early 1900. He was confirmed as sub-lieutenant dated 2 August 1900, and promoted to lieutenant on 2 August 1902. After signal course at the Naval school of Telegraphy at HMS Victory, he was in November 1902 appointed flag lieutenant to Vice Admiral Arthur Dalrymple Fanshawe as he became Commander-in-Chief Australia Station, and posted to the flagship of the station, HMS Royal Arthur.

He had reached the rank of commander by the beginning of the Great War of 1914–18 and was Commander (second-in-command) of the Monmouth-class cruiser Kent at the Battle of the Falkland Islands of 8 December 1914, during which Kent sank the Königsberg-class cruiser SMS Nürnberg.

In 1918, he joined the staff of the Vice-Admiral Commanding, Dover Patrol. In early 1919, he was in command of the scout cruiser HMS Forward when she rescued members of the Tolstoy family from the evacuation of Odessa, about to be captured by the Bolsheviks. For two years he was naval assistant to the Second Sea Lord, then in 1926 was appointed captain of the fleet in the Mediterranean Fleet. In 1928 he took command of the Royal Navy depot at Devonport, after which he was in command of the battlecruiser HMS Tiger. In 1931 he was appointed aide-de-camp to King George V and then promoted rear-admiral. From 1932 to 1934 he was chief of staff to Vice-Admiral Sir William Fisher in the Mediterranean, then from 1934 to 1937 was flag officer commanding the Royal Indian Navy. Promoted vice-admiral in 1936, he retired in November 1937, but rejoined the Navy before the outbreak of the Second World War and served again from 1938 to 1945. He returned to the Retired List in May, 1945.

While commanding the Royal Indian Navy, Bedford was also naval adviser to the Commander-in-Chief in India and defence member of the Viceroy's Executive Council.

== Honours ==
Bedford was appointed Companion of the Order of the Bath (CB) in 1934 and of the Order of the Star of India (CSI) in 1937.

== Private life ==
In 1914, Bedford married Gladys Mort, the daughter of William Edye Mort of Sydney, Australia, and they had one son, Frederick, who as a lieutenant in the Fleet Air Arm was killed on active service over Malta on 21 February 1942, at the age of 22. Bedford's father had been Governor of Western Australia from 1903 to 1909.

In retirement, Bedford lived at Easthampnett, near Chichester, Sussex, and was a member of the United Service Club in Pall Mall and the MCC. He died on board HMS Newcastle in Malta on 5 December 1949, where he had gone to visit his son's grave.

== Publications ==
- Vice Admiral A. E. F. Bedford, "The Royal Indian Navy", in The Naval Review, vol. XXVI, no. 2 (May 1938)

Military offices
Preceded by Sir Humphrey Walwyn	Commander-in-Chief, Royal Indian Navy; 1934–1937	Succeeded by Sir Herbert Fitzherbert
