= HMS Queen Mary =

Last British battlecruiser built before WWI

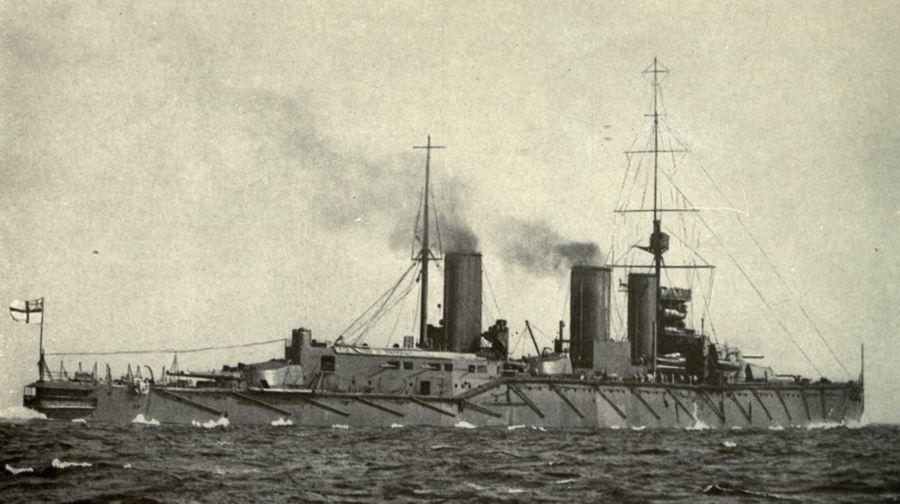
- Queen Mary at sea with torpedo net booms folded against her side

Class overview
- Operators: Royal Navy
- Preceded by: Lion class
- Succeeded by: HMS Tiger
- Built: 1911–1913
- In commission: 1913–1916
- Completed: 1
- Lost: 1

History

United Kingdom
- Name: Queen Mary
- Namesake: Queen Mary, consort of George V
- Ordered: 1910–1911 Naval Programme
- Builder: Palmers Shipbuilding and Iron Company, Jarrow
- Cost: £2,078,491
- Laid down: 6 March 1911
- Launched: 20 March 1912
- Completed: August 1913
- Commissioned: 4 September 1913
- Honours and awards: Heligoland (1914); Jutland (1916)
- Fate: Sunk during the Battle of Jutland, 31 May 1916; 56°42′N 5°54′E

General characteristics
- Type: Battlecruiser
- Displacement: 26,770 long tons (27,200 t) normal load; 31,650 long tons (32,158 t) deep load
- Length: 700 ft 1 in (213.4 m)
- Beam: 89 ft 1 in (27.2 m)
- Draught: 32 ft 4 in (9.9 m) at deep load
- Installed power: 42 Yarrow boilers; 75,000 shp (55,927 kW)
- Propulsion: 4 shafts, 2 direct-drive steam turbines
- Speed: 28 knots (51.9 km/h; 32.2 mph)
- Range: 5,610 nmi (10,390 km; 6,460 mi) at 10 knots (18.5 km/h; 11.5 mph)
- Complement: 997 (peacetime); 1,275 (wartime)
- Armament: 4 × twin 13.5 in (343 mm) guns; 16 × single 4 in (102 mm); 2 × 21 in (533 mm) torpedo tubes
- Armour: Belt: 4–9 inches (102–229 mm); Bulkheads: 4 inches (102 mm); Barbettes: 8–9 inches (203–229 mm); Turrets: 9 inches (229 mm); Decks: 2.5 inches (64 mm); Conning tower: 10 inches (254 mm)

HMS Queen Mary was the last battlecruiser built by the Royal Navy before the First World War. The sole member of her class, Queen Mary shared many features with the Lion-class battlecruisers, including her eight 13.5-inch (343 mm) guns. She was completed in 1913 and participated in the Battle of Heligoland Bight as part of the Grand Fleet in 1914. Like most of the modern British battlecruisers, the ship never left the North Sea during the war. As part of the 1st Battlecruiser Squadron, Queen Mary attempted to intercept a German force that bombarded the North Sea coast of England in December 1914, but was unsuccessful. The ship was refitted in early 1915 and missed the Battle of Dogger Bank in January, but took part in the largest fleet action of the war, the Battle of Jutland in mid-1916. She was struck twice by the German battlecruiser Derfflinger during the early part of the battle and her magazines exploded shortly afterwards, sinking her with the loss of 1,266 of her 1,286 crew members.

Her wreck was discovered in 1991 and rests in pieces, some of which are upside down, on the bed of the North Sea. Queen Mary is designated as a protected place under the Protection of Military Remains Act 1986 as a war grave.

== Design ==
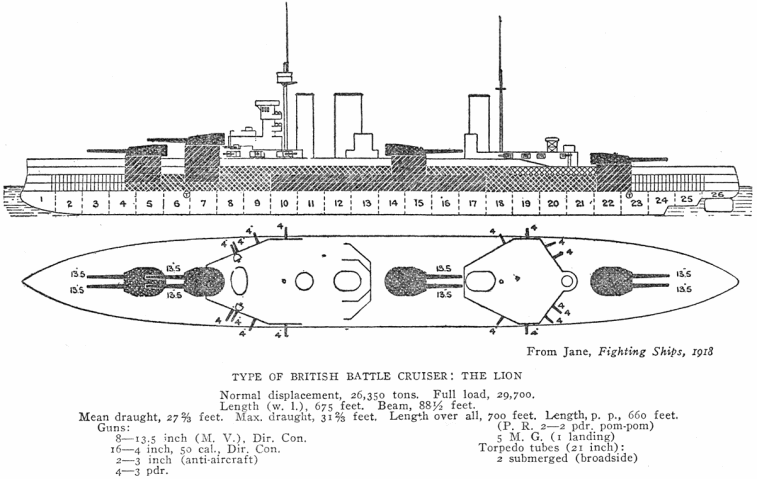
Left elevation and deck plan of the Lion-class battlecruisers, to which Queen Mary was almost identical externally

Queen Mary's construction was ordered, together with the four battleships of the King George V class, under the 1910–11 Naval Programme. As was the usual pattern of the time, only one battlecruiser was ordered per naval programme. She differed from her predecessors of the Lion class in the distribution of her secondary armament and armour and in the location of the officers' quarters. Every capital ship since the design of the battleship Dreadnought in 1905 had placed the officers' quarters closer to their action stations amidships; after complaints from the Fleet, Queen Mary was the first battlecruiser to restore the quarters to their traditional place in the stern. In addition, she was the first battlecruiser to mount a sternwalk.

Queen Mary, the only ship of her name ever to serve in the Royal Navy, was named for Mary of Teck, the wife of King George V. The Queen's representative at the ship's christening on 20 March 1912 was the wife of Viscount Allendale.

=== General characteristics ===
Slightly larger than the preceding Lion-class ships, Queen Mary had an overall length of 700 feet 1 inch (213.4 m), a beam of 89 feet 1 inch (27.2 m), and a draught of 32 feet 4 inches (9.9 m) at deep load. The ship normally displaced 26,770 long tons (27,200 t) and 31,650 long tons (32,160 t) at deep load, over 1,000 long tons (1,016 t) more than the earlier ships. She had a metacentric height of 5.92 feet (1.8 m) at deep load. In peacetime, the crew numbered 997 officers and ratings, but this increased to 1,275 during wartime.

=== Propulsion ===
The ship had two paired sets of Parsons steam turbines housed in separate engine rooms. Each set consisted of a high-pressure turbine driving an outboard propeller shaft and a low-pressure turbine driving an inner shaft. A cruising stage was built into the casing of each high-pressure turbine for economical steaming at low speeds. The turbines had a designed output of 75,000 shaft horsepower (56,000 kW), 5,000 shp (3,700 kW) more than her predecessors. On sea trials in May and June 1913, Queen Mary achieved more than 83,000 shp (62,000 kW), although she barely exceeded her designed speed of 28 knots (52 km/h; 32 mph). The steam plant consisted of 42 Yarrow boilers arranged in seven boiler rooms. Maximum bunkerage was 3,600 long tons (3,660 t) of coal and 1,170 long tons (1,190 t) of fuel oil to be sprayed on the coal to increase its burn rate. Her range was 5,610 nautical miles (10,390 km; 6,460 mi) at a speed of 10 knots (19 km/h; 12 mph).

=== Armament ===
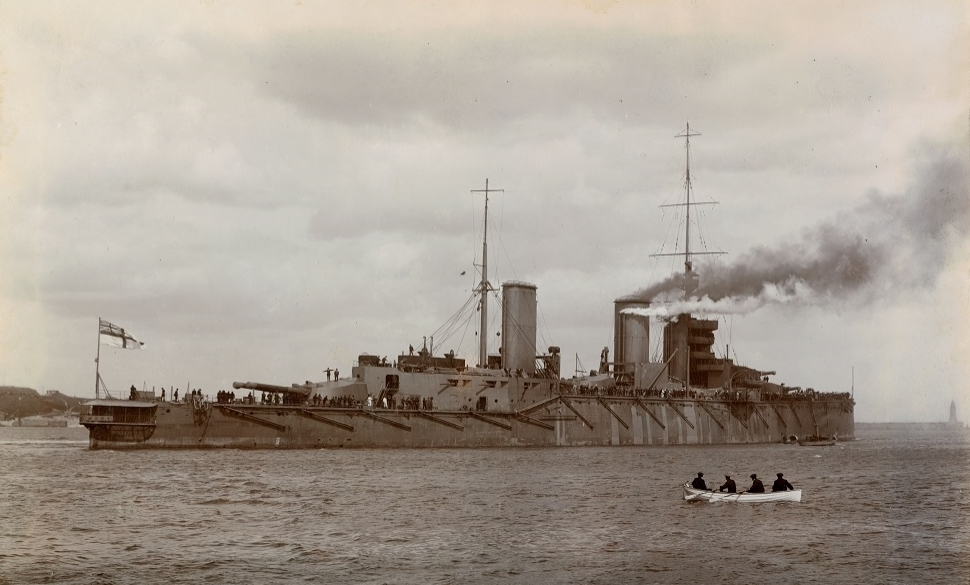
Queen Mary leaving the River Tyne, 1913

Queen Mary mounted eight BL 13.5-inch Mk V guns in four twin hydraulically powered turrets, designated 'A', 'B', 'Q' and 'X' from bow to stern. The guns could be depressed to −3° and elevated to 20°, although the director controlling the turrets was limited to 15° 21' until prisms were installed before the Battle of Jutland in May 1916 to allow full elevation. They fired 1,400-pound (635 kg) projectiles at a muzzle velocity of 2,490 ft/s (760 m/s); at 20° elevation, this provided a maximum range of 23,740 yd (21,708 m) with armour-piercing (AP) shells. The rate of fire of these guns was 1.5–2 rounds per minute. Queen Mary carried a total of 880 rounds during wartime for 110 shells per gun.

Her secondary armament consisted of sixteen BL 4-inch Mk VII guns, most of which were mounted in casemates on the forecastle deck, unlike the arrangement in the Lion class. The guns could depress to −7° and had a maximum elevation of 15°. They fired 31-pound (14 kg) projectiles at a muzzle velocity of 2,821 ft/s (860 m/s) at a maximum range of 11,400 yd (10,400 m); the ship carried 150 rounds per gun.

The ship was built without any anti-aircraft guns, but two guns were fitted in October 1914. One was a QF 6-pounder Hotchkiss gun and the other was a QF 3-inch 20 cwt, (Note: "cwt" is the abbreviation for hundredweight, 20 cwt referring to the weight of the gun.) both on high-angle mountings. The Hotchkiss fired a 6-pound (2.7 kg) shell at a muzzle velocity of 1,773 ft/s (540 m/s). The three-inch gun fired a 12.5-pound (5.7 kg) shell at a muzzle velocity of 2,604 ft/s (794 m/s) with a maximum effective ceiling of 23,000 ft (7,010 m).

Two 21-inch (530 mm) submerged torpedo tubes were fitted, one on each broadside. Fourteen Mk II*** torpedoes were carried, each of which had a warhead of 400 pounds (181 kg) of TNT. Their range was 4,500 yards (4,115 m) at 45 knots (83 km/h; 52 mph) or 10,000 yards (9,144 m) at 29 knots (54 km/h; 33 mph).

=== Fire control ===
In February 1913, the Admiralty bought five sets of fire-control equipment from Arthur Pollen for comparative trials with the equipment designed by Commander Frederic Dreyer. One set was mounted in Queen Mary and consisted of a 9-foot (2.7 m) Argo rangefinder located on top of the conning tower that fed range data into an Argo Clock Mk IV (a mechanical fire-control computer) located in the transmitting station below the conning tower. The clock converted the information into range and deflection data for use by the guns. The target's data was also graphically recorded on a plotting table to assist the gunnery officer in predicting the movement of the target. The aft torpedo director tower was the backup gunnery control position. All four turrets were provided with 9-foot rangefinders and 'B' and 'X' turrets were further outfitted to serve as auxiliary control positions.

Fire-control technology advanced quickly during the years immediately preceding World War I, and the development of the director firing system was a major advance. This consisted of a fire-control director mounted high in the ship which electrically provided elevation and training angles to the turrets via pointers, which the turret crewmen only had to follow. The guns were fired simultaneously, which aided in spotting the shell splashes and minimized the effects of the roll on the dispersion of the shells. Queen Mary received her director before the Battle of Jutland.

=== Armour ===
The armour protection given to Queen Mary was similar to that of the Lions; her waterline belt of Krupp cemented armour was also 9 inches (229 mm) thick between 'B' and 'X' turrets. It thinned to 4 inches (102 mm) inches towards the ships' ends, but did not reach either the bow or the stern. In addition the ship was given an upper armour belt with a maximum thickness of six inches over the same length as the thickest part of the waterline armour, thinning to 5 inches (127 mm) abreast the end turrets. Four-inch transverse bulkheads closed off the ends of the armoured citadel. High-tensile steel plating, cheaper than nickel-steel, but equally as effective, was used for the protective decks. The lower armoured deck was generally only 1 inch (25 mm) thick except outside the citadel where it was 2.5 inches (64 mm). The upper armoured deck was situated at the top of the upper armour belt and was also only one inch thick. The forecastle deck ranged from 1 to 1.5 inches (25.4 to 38.1 mm).

The gun turrets had nine-inch fronts and sides, while their roofs were 2.5 to 3.25 inches (64 to 83 mm) thick. The barbettes were protected by nine inches of armour above the deck, but it thinned to 8 inches (203 mm) above the upper armour deck and 3 inches (76 mm) below it. The forward 4-inch guns were protected by three-inch sides and a two-inch high-tensile steel deck overhead. The conning tower sides were 10 inches (254 mm) thick, with three-inch roofs and communication tubes. Her aft torpedo director tower was protected by six-inch walls and a three-inch cast steel roof. High-tensile steel torpedo bulkheads 2.5 inches (64 mm) thick were fitted abreast the magazines and shell rooms. Her funnel uptakes were protected by high-tensile steel splinter armour 1.5 inches (38 mm) thick on the sides and one inch thick on the ends between the upper and forecastle decks.

== Construction and career ==
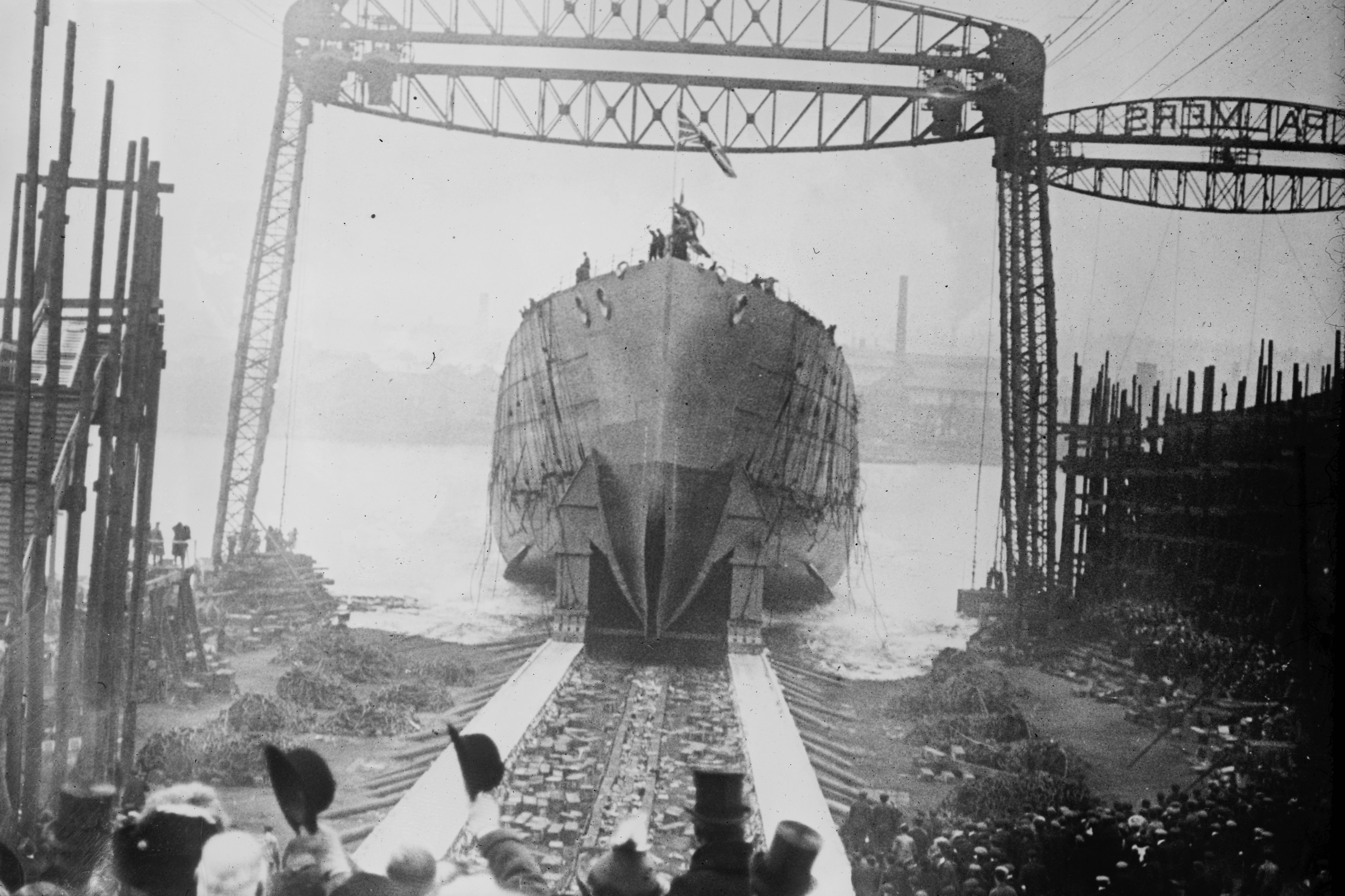
Launch of Queen Mary at Palmer's Shipbuilding

Queen Mary was laid down at Palmers Shipbuilding and Iron Company at their shipyard in Jarrow on 6 March 1911. She was launched on 20 March 1912 and was completed in August 1913 at a total cost of £2,078,491 (including guns). The ship came under the command of Captain Reginald Hall on 1 July and was commissioned on 4 September. Assigned to the 1st Battlecruiser Squadron (BCS) under the command of Rear Admiral David Beatty, Queen Mary and the rest of the 1st BCS made a port visit to Brest in February 1914 and the squadron visited Russia in June.

=== First World War ===
==== Battle of Heligoland Bight ====
Queen Mary's first action was as part of the battlecruiser force under the command of Beatty during the Battle of Heligoland Bight on 28 August 1914. Beatty's ships had originally been intended as distant support of the British cruisers and destroyers closer to the German coast in case the large ships of the High Seas Fleet sortied in response to the British attacks. They turned south at full speed at 11:35 (Note: The times used in this article are in Greenwich Mean Time, which was one hour behind CET, which is often used in German works.) when the British light forces failed to disengage on schedule, and the rising tide meant that German capital ships would be able to clear the bar at the mouth of the Jade Estuary. The brand-new light cruiser Arethusa had been crippled earlier in the battle and was under fire from the German light cruisers SMS Strassburg and SMS Cöln when Beatty's battlecruisers loomed out of the mist at 12:37. Strassburg was able to duck into the mists and evade fire, but Cöln remained visible and was quickly crippled by fire from the squadron. Beatty, however, was distracted from the task of finishing her off by the sudden appearance of the elderly light cruiser SMS Ariadne directly ahead of him. He turned in pursuit and reduced her to a flaming hulk in only three salvos at a range of 6,000 yards (5,486 m). At 13:10, Beatty turned north and made a general signal to retire. Beatty's main body encountered the crippled Cöln shortly after turning north, and she was sunk by two salvos from Lion.

==== Raid on Scarborough ====
The Imperial German Navy had decided on a strategy of bombarding British towns on the North Sea coast in an attempt to draw out the Royal Navy and destroy elements of it in detail. An earlier Raid on Yarmouth on 3 November had been partially successful, but a larger-scale operation was devised by Admiral Franz von Hipper afterward. The fast battlecruisers were to conduct the bombardment, while the entire High Seas Fleet was to station itself east of Dogger Bank to provide cover for their return and to destroy any elements of the Royal Navy that responded to the raid. But what the Germans did not know was that the British were reading the German naval codes and were planning to catch the raiding force on its return journey, although they were not aware that the High Seas Fleet would be at sea as well. Together with the six dreadnoughts of the 2nd Battle Squadron, Beatty's 1st BCS – now reduced to four ships, including Lion – was detached from the Grand Fleet in an attempt to intercept the Germans near Dogger Bank. By this time, Queen Mary was commanded by Captain C. I. Prowse.

Hipper set sail on 15 December 1914 for another such raid and successfully bombarded several English towns, but British destroyers escorting the 1st BCS had already encountered German destroyers of the High Seas Fleet at 05:15 and fought an inconclusive action with them. Vice Admiral Sir George Warrender – commanding the 2nd Battle Squadron – had received a signal at 05:40 that the destroyer Lynx was engaging enemy destroyers, although Beatty had not. The destroyer Shark spotted the armoured cruiser SMS Roon and her escorts at about 07:00, but she could not transmit the message until 07:25. Warrender received the signal – as did the battlecruiser New Zealand – but Beatty did not, despite the fact that New Zealand had been specifically tasked to relay messages between the destroyers and Beatty. Warrender attempted to pass on Shark's message to Beatty at 07:36, but he did not manage to make contact until 07:55. Beatty reversed course when he got the message and dispatched New Zealand to search for Roon. She was being overhauled by New Zealand when Beatty received messages that Scarborough was being shelled at 09:00. Beatty ordered New Zealand to rejoin the squadron and turned west for Scarborough.

Relative positions of the British and German forces at about 12:00 hours

The British forces split going around the shallow Southwest Patch of the Dogger Bank; Beatty's ships passed to the north, while Warrender passed to the south as they headed west to block the main route through the minefields defending the English coast. This left a 15-nautical-mile (28 km; 17 mi) gap between them through which the German light forces began to move. At 12:25, the light cruisers of the II Scouting Group began to pass the British forces searching for Hipper. The light cruiser Southampton spotted the light cruiser SMS Stralsund and signalled a report to Beatty. At 12:30, Beatty turned his battlecruisers towards the German ships. Beatty presumed the German cruisers were the advance screen for Hipper's ships; however, those were some 31 miles (50 km) behind. The 2nd Light Cruiser Squadron – which had been screening for Beatty's ships – detached to pursue the German cruisers, but a misinterpreted signal from the British battlecruisers sent them back to their screening positions. (Note: Beatty had intended on retaining only the two rearmost light cruisers from Goodenough's squadron; however, Nottingham's signalman misinterpreted the signal, thinking it was intended for the whole squadron, and thus transmitted it to Goodenough, who ordered his ships back into their screening positions ahead of Beatty's battlecruisers.) This confusion allowed the German light cruisers to escape, and alerted Hipper to the location of the British battlecruisers. The German battlecruisers wheeled to the northeast of the British forces and made good their escape.

Queen Mary was refitting in January and February 1915 and did not participate in the Battle of Dogger Bank; she received her main battery director in December 1915.

==== Battle of Jutland ====
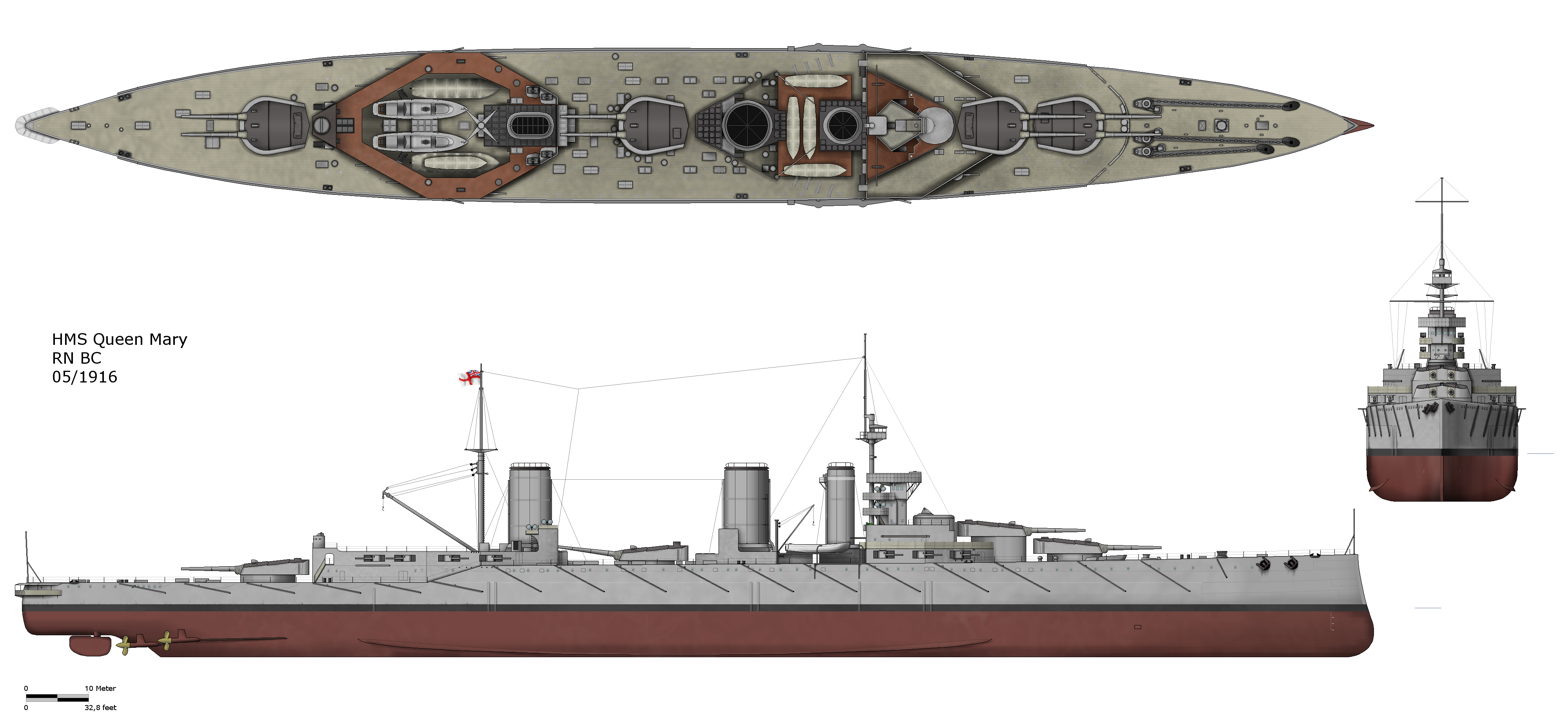
Queen Mary in her configuration at Jutland

On 31 May 1916, Queen Mary put to sea with the rest of the Battlecruiser Fleet to intercept a sortie by the High Seas Fleet into the North Sea. The British were able to decode the German radio messages and left their bases before the Germans put to sea. Hipper's battlecruisers spotted the Battlecruiser Fleet to their west at 15:20, but Beatty's ships did not spot the Germans to their east until 15:30. Two minutes later, he ordered a course change to east south-east to position himself astride the German's line of retreat and called his ships' crews to action stations. Hipper ordered his ships to turn to starboard, away from the British, almost 180 degrees, to assume a south-easterly course, and reduced speed to 18 knots (33 km/h; 21 mph) to allow three light cruisers of the 2nd Scouting Group to catch up. With this turn, Hipper was falling back on the High Seas Fleet, then about 60 nautical miles (110 km; 69 mi) behind him. Around this time, Beatty altered course to the east, as it was quickly apparent that he was still too far north to cut off Hipper.

This began what was to be called the "Run to the South" as Beatty changed course to steer east-southeast at 15:45, paralleling Hipper's course, now that the range closed to under 18,000 yards (16,000 m). The Germans opened fire first at 15:48, followed by the British. The British ships were still in the process of making their turn, as only the two leading ships – Lion and Princess Royal – had steadied on their course when the Germans opened fire. The German fire was accurate from the beginning, but the British overestimated the range, as the German ships blended into the haze. Queen Mary opened fire about 15:50 on SMS Seydlitz, using only her forward turrets. By 15:54, the range was down to 12,900 yards (11,800 m), and Beatty ordered a course change two points to starboard to open up the range at 15:57. During this period, Queen Mary made two hits on Seydlitz, at 15:55 and 15:57, one of which caused a propellant fire that burnt out her aft superfiring turret.

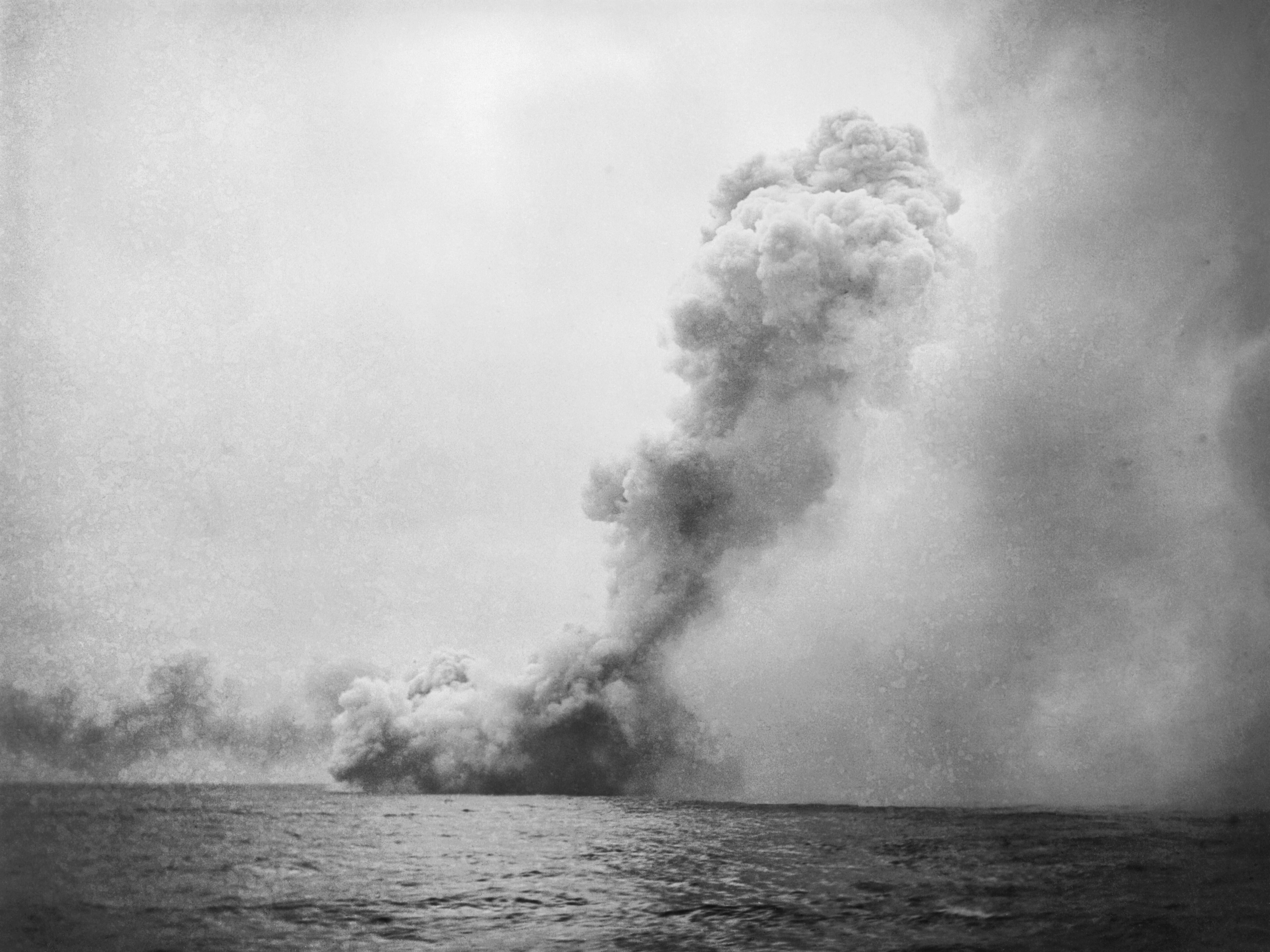
Queen Mary explodes during the Battle of Jutland

The range had grown too far for accurate shooting, so Beatty altered course four points to port to close the range again between 16:12 and 16:15. This manoeuvre exposed Lion to the fire of the German battlecruisers, and she was hit several times. The smoke and fumes from these hits caused SMS Derfflinger to lose sight of Lion – which had sheered out of line to starboard – and to switch her fire to Queen Mary, now visible to Derfflinger's gunnery officer as the second ship in the British line and therefore assumed to be Princess Royal, at 16:16. Queen Mary hit Seydlitz again at 16:17 and knocked out one gun of her secondary armament. In return, Queen Mary had been hit twice by Seydlitz before 16:21 with unknown effects, but the German battlecruiser hit the turret face of 'Q' turret at that time and knocked out the right-hand gun in the turret. By 16:25, the range was down to 14,400 yards (13,200 m), and Beatty turned two points to starboard to open the range again. This move came too late for Queen Mary, however, as Derfflinger's fire began to take effect, hitting her twice before 16:26. One shell hit forward and detonated one or both of the forward magazines, which broke the ship in two near the foremast. Stationed inside 'Q' turret, Midshipman Jocelyn Storey survived and reported that there had been a large explosion forward which rocked the turret, breaking the left gun in half, the gun breech falling into the working chamber and the right gun coming off its trunnions. Cordite in the working chamber caught fire and produced poisonous fumes that asphyxiated some of the turret's crew. It is doubtful that an explosion forward could have done this, so 'Q' turret may have been struck by the second shell. A further explosion, possibly from shells breaking loose, shook the aft end of the ship as it began to roll over and sink. Tiger, the battlecruiser behind her, was showered with debris from the explosion and forced to steer to port to avoid her remains. 1,266 crewmen were lost; eighteen survivors were picked up by the destroyers Laurel, Petard, and Tipperary, and two by the Germans. (Note: Casualty figures are in general agreement, although the number of survivors varies. According to Corbett and the Narrative of the Battle of Jutland casualties were: 57 officers and 1,209 ratings killed (1,266 total); two officers and five ratings wounded (7 total); one officer and one rating prisoners of war. Parkes gives the total officers killed as 67 instead of 57, presumably a typographical error. Campbell gives casualties as 1,266 killed, six wounded and two made prisoner.)

== Aftermath ==
Queen Mary, along with the other Jutland wrecks, has been declared a protected place under the Protection of Military Remains Act 1986 to discourage further damage to the resting place of 1,266 officers and men. Surveys of this site conducted by nautical archaeologist Innes McCartney in 2001–03 have shown the wreck is in three sections, with the two forward sections being heavily damaged and in pieces. Her aft end is upside down and relatively complete except for her propellers, which have been salvaged. Examination of the damage to the ship has suggested that the initial explosion was not in the magazine of 'A' or 'B' forward main turrets, but instead in the magazine of the forward 4-inch battery. An explosion of the quantity of cordite in the main magazine would have been sufficient to also ignite 'Q' magazine, destroying much more of the ship. The explosion in the smaller magazine would have been sufficient to break the ship in two, the blast then spreading to the forward magazine and ripping apart the forward section.

== Bibliography ==
- Brooks, John (2005). Dreadnought Gunnery and the Battle of Jutland: The Question of Fire Control. Cass Series: Naval Policy and History. Vol. 32. Routledge. ISBN 0-415-40788-5.
- Brown, David K. (1999). The Grand Fleet: Warship Design and Development 1906–1922. Naval Institute Press. ISBN 1-55750-315-X.
- Burr, Lawrence (2006). British Battlecruisers 1914–1918. New Vanguard. Vol. 126. Osprey. ISBN 1-84603-008-0.
- Burt, R. A. (2012). British Battleships of World War One (2nd ed.). Naval Institute Press. ISBN 978-1-59114-053-5.
- Campbell, N. J. M. (1978). Battle Cruisers. Warship Special. Vol. 1. Conway Maritime Press. ISBN 0-85177-130-0.
- Campbell, N. J. M. (1986). Jutland: An Analysis of the Fighting. Naval Institute Press. ISBN 0-87021-324-5.
- Colledge, J. J.; Warlow, Ben (2006) [1969]. Ships of the Royal Navy: The Complete Record of All Fighting Ships of the Royal Navy from the 15th Century to the Present (3rd Rev ed.). London: Chatham Publishing. ISBN 978-1-86176-281-8. OCLC 67375475.
- Corbett, Julian (1997) [1940]. Naval Operations. History of the Great War: Based on Official Documents. Vol. III (Second ed.). Imperial War Museum in association with the Battery Press. ISBN 1-870423-50-X.
- Friedman, Norman (2011). Naval Weapons of World War One: Guns, Torpedoes, Mines and ASW Weapons of All Nations; An Illustrated Directory. Seaforth Publishing. ISBN 978-1-84832-100-7.
- Great Britain (1924). Narrative of the Battle of Jutland. H.M. Stationery Office. OCLC 558451990.
- Massie, Robert K. (2003). Castles of Steel: Britain, Germany, and the Winning of the Great War at Sea. Random House. ISBN 0-679-45671-6.
- Parkes, Oscar (1990) [1966]. British Battleships, Warrior 1860 to Vanguard 1950: A History of Design, Construction, and Armament (New & rev. ed.). Naval Institute Press. ISBN 1-55750-075-4.
- Preston, Antony (1985). "Great Britain and Empire Forces". In Gray, Randal (ed.). Conway's All the World's Fighting Ships 1906–1921. Naval Institute Press. pp. 1–104. ISBN 0-85177-245-5.
- Roberts, John (1997). Battlecruisers. Naval Institute Press. ISBN 1-55750-068-1.
- Silverstone, Paul H. (1984). Directory of the World's Capital Ships. Hippocrene Books. ISBN 0-88254-979-0.
- Sturton, Ian, ed. (1987). Conway's All the World's Battleships: 1906 to the Present. Conway Maritime Press. ISBN 0-85177-448-2.
- Tarrant, V. E. (1999) [1995]. Jutland: The German Perspective: A New View of the Great Battle, 31 May 1916. Brockhampton Press. ISBN 1-86019-917-8.
- Williams, M. W. (1996). "The Loss of HMS Queen Mary at Jutland". Warship 1996. Conway Maritime Press. pp. 111–132. ISBN 0-85177-685-X.
