= Chanting the Light of Foresight =

1987 musical composition by Terry Riley

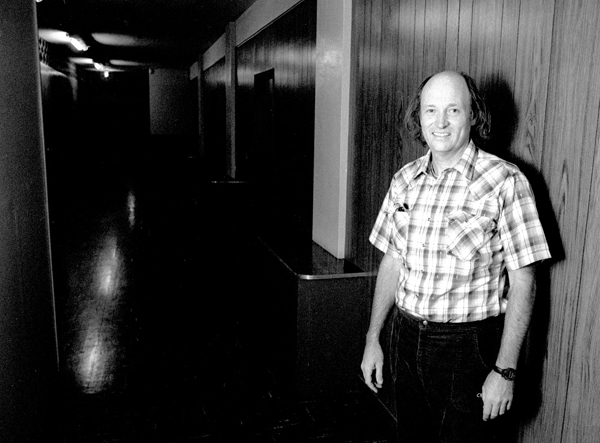
Terry Riley at the Great American Music Hall, San Francisco, 1985

Chanting the Light of Foresight (imbas forasnai) is a 1987 composition by Terry Riley. Written for and commissioned by the Rova Saxophone Quartet, during the course of the composition it was decided that Rova would compose "The Chord of War" while "The Pipes of Medb/Medb's Blues" contains improvisation.

The piece is based on the Taín Bó Cuailnge (The Cattle Raid of Cooley, translated by Thomas Kinsella), a part of the eighth-century Ulster Cycle of heroic tales.

The work is partly in resonant intonation, requiring false fingerings, jaw manipulations, and straining the lips and lungs, and contains many unusual time signatures. "The Tuning Path" and "The Pipes of Medb" progresses from simple to more complex areas of tuning, statically depicting night on the battlefield. "Medb's Blues" is in the form of a 6 bar 10/4 blues where players alternately keep a cantus firmus while others improvise. "Song Announcing Dawn's Combat" depicts foster brothers and main character adversaries Cúchulainn and Ferdia and uses 7/8 rhythms, pulsing drones, and Hindustani scales to refer to the Bhagavad Gita. Ferdia is killed by his brother with a secret weapon, gae bolga, which Cúchulainn removes from the body while lamenting in "Ferdia's Death Chant". Cúchulainn completes his training under Scáthach as a warrior and shaman, and she chants to him his future through the imbas forasnai through repeated phrases containing 8/8 and 7/8 measures. Only the first chord of the Rova-composed section does not appear throughout the rest of the piece. Riley responded to Rova's concern for this by saying, "Well — that's the chord of war."

== Movements ==
The work has six movements:

1. The Tuning Path
2. The Pipes of Medb/Medb's Blues
3. Song Announcing Dawn's Combat
4. The Chord of War
5. Ferdia's Death Chant
6. Chanting the Light of Foresight

The piece was rereleased in 1994, and was performed by Rova.
