= HMS Foresight (1904) =

Royal Navy Forward-class scout cruiser

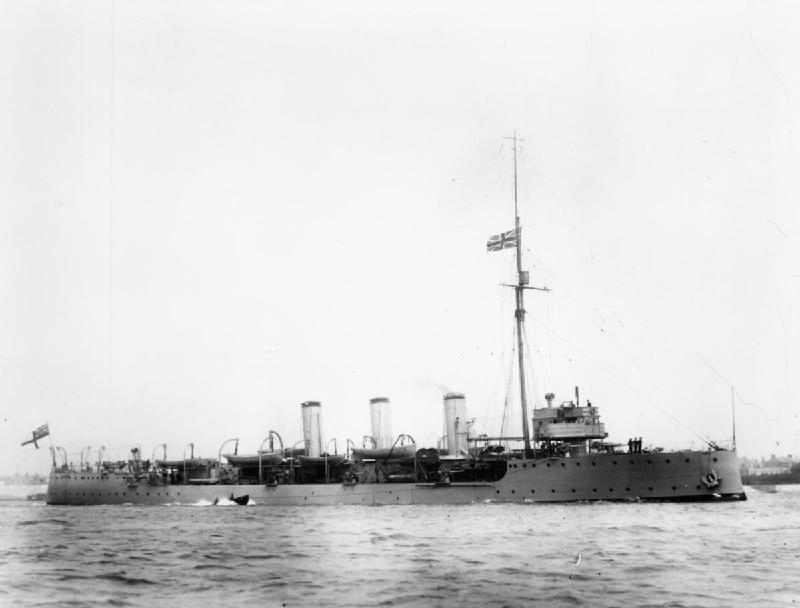

History

United Kingdom
- Name: Foresight
- Builder: Fairfield Shipbuilding and Engineering Company, Govan
- Laid down: 24 October 1903
- Launched: 8 October 1904
- Commissioned: August 1905
- Fate: Sold for scrap, 3 March 1920

General characteristics (as built)
- Class & type: Forward-class scout cruiser
- Displacement: 2,850 long tons (2,896 t)
- Length: 365 ft (111.3 m) (p/p)
- Beam: 39 ft 2 in (11.9 m)
- Draught: 14 ft 3 in (4.3 m)
- Installed power: 16,500 ihp (12,300 kW); 12 Thornycroft boilers
- Propulsion: 2 Shafts, 2 triple-expansion steam engines
- Speed: 25 knots (46 km/h; 29 mph)
- Range: 3,400 nmi (6,300 km; 3,900 mi) at 10 knots (19 km/h; 12 mph)
- Complement: 289
- Armament: 10 × QF 12-pdr 3 in (76 mm) guns; 8 × QF 3-pdr (47 mm) guns; 2 × 18 in (450 mm) torpedo tubes
- Armour: Waterline belt: 2 in (51 mm); Deck: 0.625–1.125 in (15.9–28.6 mm); Conning tower: 3 in (76 mm)

HMS Foresight was one of two Forward-class scout cruisers built for the Royal Navy during the first decade of the 20th century. The ship was in reserve for most of the first decade of her existence. After the beginning of the First World War in August 1914, she was initially assigned to the Dover Patrol and was then transferred to the 8th Destroyer Flotilla. Foresight was sent to the Mediterranean in mid-1915 and was then assigned to the Aegean Sea a year later, together with her sister ship, Forward, and remained there until the end of the war. After returning home in 1919, she was sold for scrap in 1920.

== Design and description ==
The Forward-class ships were one of four classes of scout cruisers ordered by the Admiralty in 1902–1903 and 1903–1904 Naval Programmes. These ships were intended to work with destroyer flotillas, leading their torpedo attacks and backing them up when attacked by other destroyers, although they quickly became less useful as destroyer speeds increased before the First World War. They had a length between perpendiculars of 365 feet (111.3 m), a beam of 39 feet 2 inches (11.9 m) and a draught of 14 feet 3 inches (4.3 m). The ships displaced 2,850 long tons (2,896 t) at normal load and 3,100 long tons (3,150 t) at deep load. Their crew consisted of 289 officers and ratings.

The ships were powered by a pair of three-cylinder triple-expansion steam engines, each driving one shaft, using steam provided by a dozen Thornycroft boilers. The engines were designed to produce a total of 16,500 indicated horsepower (12,300 kW) which was intended to give a maximum speed of 25 knots (46 km/h; 29 mph). When Foresight ran her sea trials, she reached a speed of 25.1 knots (46.5 km/h; 28.9 mph) from 14,227 ihp (10,609 kW) for eight hours. The Forward-class cruisers carried enough coal to give them a range of 3,400 nautical miles (6,300 km; 3,900 mi) at 10 knots (19 km/h; 12 mph).

The main armament of the Forward class consisted of ten quick-firing (QF) 12-pounder 3 in (76 mm) 18-cwt guns. (Note: "Cwt" is the abbreviation for hundredweight, 18 cwt referring to the weight of the gun.) Three guns were mounted abreast on the forecastle and the quarterdeck, with the remaining four guns positioned port and starboard amidships. They also carried eight 3-pounder Hotchkiss guns and two above-water 18-inch (450 mm) torpedo tubes, one on each broadside. The ships' protective deck armour ranged in thickness from .625 to 1.125 inches (16 to 29 mm) and the conning tower had armour 3 inches (76 mm) inches thick. They had a waterline belt 2 inches (51 mm) thick abreast machinery spaces.

== Construction and career ==
HMS Foresight was laid down by the Fairfield Shipbuilding and Engineering Company at their Govan shipyard on 24 October 1903, launched on 8 October 1904 and completed on 8 September 1905. Not long after completion, two additional 12-pounder guns were added and the 3-pounder guns were replaced with six QF 6-pounder Hotchkiss guns. The ship was in the reserve of the Portsmouth Division of the Home Fleet from completion until October 1909, when she joined the 2nd Destroyer Flotilla as its leader. In 1910 she joined the 3rd Destroyer Flotilla, then in 1911 the 6th Flotilla at Dover. About 1911–1912, her main guns were replaced by nine 4-inch (102 mm) guns, arranged four on each broadside and the remaining gun on the quarterdeck. Foresight was reduced to reserve in early 1912. In November 1913, she accidentally collided with the destroyer Falcon.

At the start of the First World War she was assigned to the Dover Patrol, then the 8th Destroyer Flotilla, still at Dover. She took part in the operations off the Flanders coast during October 1914 that helped to protect the Allied flank during the battle of the Yser. In May 1915 she was temporarily transferred to the 6th Light Cruiser Squadron on the Humber, guarding against Zeppelin raids on the east coast. In 1915 she served in the Mediterranean and in July 1916 in the Aegean with her sister ship HMS Forward until the end of the war. In November 1916, she resuced some of the survivors of HMHS Britannic which had sunk in the Kea Channel after striking a mine.

Foresight was paid off in June 1919. The ship was sold for scrap on 3 March 1920.

== Bibliography ==
- Chesneau, Roger & Kolesnik, Eugene M., eds. (1979). Conway's All the World's Fighting Ships 1860–1905. Greenwich: Conway Maritime Press. ISBN 0-8317-0302-4.
- Corbett, Julian (March 1997). Naval Operations to the Battle of the Falklands. History of the Great War: Based on Official Documents. Vol. I (2nd, reprint of the 1938 ed.). London and Nashville, Tennessee: Imperial War Museum and Battery Press. ISBN 0-89839-256-X.
- Friedman, Norman (2009). British Destroyers From Earliest Days to the Second World War. Annapolis, Maryland: Naval Institute Press. ISBN 978-1-59114-081-8.
- Friedman, Norman (2011). Naval Weapons of World War One. Barnsley, South Yorkshire, UK: Seaforth. ISBN 978-1-84832-100-7.
- Gardiner, Robert & Gray, Randal, eds. (1985). Conway's All the World's Fighting Ships 1906–1921. Annapolis, Maryland: Naval Institute Press. ISBN 0-85177-245-5.
- McBride, K. D. (1994). "The Royal Navy 'Scout' Class of 1904–05". Warship International. XXXI (3): 260–281. ISSN 0043-0374.
- Morris, Douglas (1987). Cruisers of the Royal and Commonwealth Navies Since 1879. Liskeard, UK: Maritime Books. ISBN 0-907771-35-1.
