= Forward-class cruiser =

Pair of Royal Navy scout cruisers

Forward class
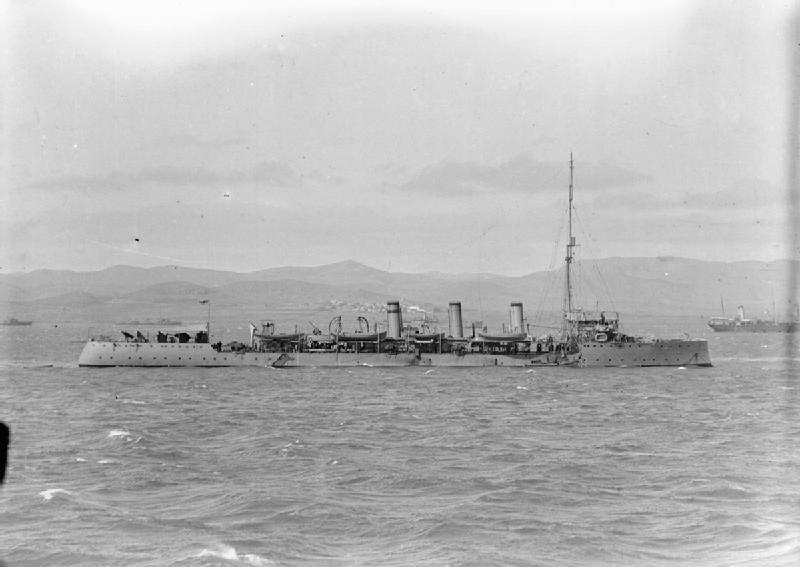
- HMS Forward

Class overview
- Name: Forward
- Operators: Royal Navy
- Preceded by: Adventure class
- Succeeded by: Pathfinder class
- Built: 1903–1905
- In commission: 1905–1919
- Completed: 2
- Scrapped: 2

General characteristics (as built)
- Type: Scout cruiser
- Displacement: 2,850 long tons (2,896 t)
- Length: 365 ft (111.3 m) (p/p)
- Beam: 39 ft 2 in (11.9 m)
- Draught: 14 ft 3 in (4.3 m)
- Installed power: 16,500 ihp (12,300 kW); 12 Thornycroft boilers
- Propulsion: 2 Shafts, 2 triple-expansion steam engines
- Speed: 25 knots (46 km/h; 29 mph)
- Range: 3,400 nmi (6,300 km; 3,900 mi) at 10 knots (19 km/h; 12 mph)
- Complement: 289
- Armament: 10 × QF 12-pdr 3 in (76 mm) guns; 8 × QF 3-pdr (47 mm) guns; 2 × 18 in (450 mm) torpedo tubes
- Armour: Waterline belt: 2 in (51 mm); Deck: 0.625–1.125 in (15.9–28.6 mm); Conning tower: 3 in (76 mm)

The Forward-class cruisers were a pair of scout cruisers built for the Royal Navy in the first decade of the 20th century. The sister ships spent much of the first decade of their careers in reserve. When the First World War began in August 1914 they were given coastal defence missions, Foresight in the English Channel and Forward on the coast of Yorkshire. The latter ship was in Hartlepool when the German bombarded it in December, but never fired a shot. The ships were transferred to the Mediterranean in 1915 and then to the Aegean in mid-1916 where they remained until 1918. They survived the war, but were scrapped shortly afterwards.

== Background and description ==
In 1901–1902, the Admiralty developed scout cruisers to work with destroyer flotillas, leading their torpedo attacks and backing them up when attacked by other destroyers. In May 1902, it requested tenders for a design that was capable of 25 knots (46 km/h; 29 mph), a protective deck, a range of 2,000 nautical miles (3,700 km; 2,300 mi) and an armament of six quick-firing (QF) 12-pounder (3 in (76 mm)) 18 cwt guns, (Note: "Cwt" is the abbreviation for hundredweight, 18 cwt referring to the weight of the gun.) eight QF 3-pounder (47 mm) guns and two 18-inch (450 mm) torpedo tubes. It accepted four of the submissions and ordered one ship from each builder in the 1902–1903 Naval Programme and a repeat in the following year's programme.

The two ships from Fairfield Shipbuilding and Engineering Company became the Forward class. Four more 12-pounders were added to the specification in August. The ships had a length between perpendiculars of 365 feet (111.3 m), a beam of 39 feet 2 inches (11.9 m) and a draught of 14 feet 3 inches (4.3 m). They displaced 2,850 long tons (2,896 t) at normal load and 3,100 long tons (3,150 t) at deep load. Their crew consisted of 289 officers and ratings.

The Forward-class ships were powered by a pair of three-cylinder triple-expansion steam engines, each driving one shaft, using steam provided by a dozen Thornycroft boilers that exhausted into three funnels. The engines were designed to produce a total of 16,500 indicated horsepower (12,300 kW) which was intended to give a maximum speed of 25 knots. The sisters slightly exceeded their design speed when they ran their sea trials in 1905. The scout cruisers soon proved too slow for this role as newer destroyers outpaced them. The ships carried a maximum of 500 long tons (508 t) of coal which gave them a range of 3,400 nautical miles (6,300 km; 3,900 mi) at a speed of 10 knots (19 km/h; 12 mph).

The main armament of the Forward class consisted of ten QF 12-pounder 18-cwt guns. Three guns were mounted abreast on the forecastle and the quarterdeck, with the remaining four guns positioned port and starboard amidships. They also carried eight QF 3-pounder Hotchkiss guns and two single mounts for 18-inch torpedo tubes, one on each broadside. The ships' protective deck armour ranged in thickness from .625 to 1.125 inches (16 to 29 mm) and the conning tower had armour 3 inches (76 mm) inches thick. They had a waterline belt 2 inches (51 mm) thick abreast machinery spaces.

== Ships ==
Construction data
Ship	Builder	Laid down	Launched	Completed	Fate
HMS Forward	Fairfield Shipbuilding and Engineering Company, Govan	22 October 1903	27 August 1904	22 August 1905	Sold for scrap, 27 July 1921
HMS Foresight	Fairfield Shipbuilding and Engineering Company, Govan	24 October 1903	18 October 1904	8 September 1905	Sold for scrap, March 1920

== Service history ==
The sisters were in reserve for most of the first decade of their existence. After the beginning of the First World War in August 1914, Foresight was initially assigned to the Dover Patrol and was then transferred to a destroyer flotilla patrolling the English Channel. Forward was assigned to coastal defence duties on the East Coast of England; she was present when the Germans bombarded Hartlepool in mid-December 1914, but played no significant role in the battle. The sisters were sent to the Mediterranean in 1915 and were then assigned to the Aegean Sea a year later and remained there until the end of the war. After returning home in 1919, they were paid off and broken up in 1920–1921.

== Bibliography ==
- Friedman, Norman (2009). British Destroyers From Earliest Days to the Second World War. Annapolis, Maryland: Naval Institute Press. ISBN 978-1-59114-081-8.
- Friedman, Norman (2011). Naval Weapons of World War One. Barnsley, South Yorkshire, UK: Seaforth. ISBN 978-1-84832-100-7.
- Massie, Robert K. (2003). Castles of Steel: Britain, Germany, and the Winning of the Great War at Sea. New York: Random House. ISBN 0-679-45671-6.
- McBride, K. D. (1994). "The Royal Navy 'Scout' Class of 1904–05". Warship International. XXXI (3): 260–281. ISSN 0043-0374.
- Morris, Douglas (1987). Cruisers of the Royal and Commonwealth Navies Since 1879. Liskeard, UK: Maritime Books. ISBN 0-907771-35-1.
- Preston, Antony (1985). "Great Britain and Empire Forces". In Gardiner, Robert & Gray, Randal (eds.). Conway's All the World's Fighting Ships 1906–1921. Annapolis, Maryland: Naval Institute Press. pp. 1–104. ISBN 0-85177-245-5.
- Roberts, John (1979). "Great Britain (Including Empire Forces)". In Chesneau, Roger & Kolesnik, Eugene M. (eds.). Conway's All the World's Fighting Ships 1860–1905. Greenwich: Conway Maritime Press. pp. 1–114. ISBN 0-8317-0302-4.
