= List of ships built at John I. Thornycroft & Company, Woolston =

This is a list of ships built by John I. Thornycroft & Company at the yard at Woolston, England. In 1966 the company merged with Vosper & Company. The combined company continued production at Woolston, and the ships produced after the merger are not included in this list.

== Ships ==
The list is sorted chronologically, with the yard number as secondary key. A large part of the information has been provided by the Miramar Ship Index (www.miramarshipindex.org.nz) through a Wikipedia partnership. However, the official lists of vessels built by Thornycroft (at both Chiswick and at Woolston) are available in the unpublished (but officially recognised) Thornycroft List of 1981 researched and compiled by the late David Lyon with assistance of Thornycroft personnel and the company's archives.

Completed	Name	Yard No	Tonnage	Description	Illustration
1904c	Albion	#379	?	Motor launch, 35 feet (11 m) length, built for Hauter and Co. Apparently the first vessel built at the Woolston yard.	
1905	Thomas More	#385	125	Six paddle steamers for the London County Council's short-lived river service on the Thames. Length overall 40.8 metres (134.0 ft). They did up to 11.5 knots on trials. The Ben Johnson was sold in 1909 to the Steamship Company of Lake Lucerne where she was rebuilt and rechristened Rhein, and in use on Lake Lucerne until 1939. From 1946 to 1949, the motor ship Waldstätter was built using her hull. This ship was then in use until 2001, when it was scrapped.	
1905	Gresham	#386	125	Six paddle steamers for the London County Council's short-lived river service on the Thames. Length overall 40.8 metres (134.0 ft). They did up to 11.5 knots on trials. The Ben Johnson was sold in 1909 to the Steamship Company of Lake Lucerne where she was rebuilt and rechristened Rhein, and in use on Lake Lucerne until 1939. From 1946 to 1949, the motor ship Waldstätter was built using her hull. This ship was then in use until 2001, when it was scrapped.	
1905	Francis Drake	#387	125	Six paddle steamers for the London County Council's short-lived river service on the Thames. Length overall 40.8 metres (134.0 ft). They did up to 11.5 knots on trials. The Ben Johnson was sold in 1909 to the Steamship Company of Lake Lucerne where she was rebuilt and rechristened Rhein, and in use on Lake Lucerne until 1939. From 1946 to 1949, the motor ship Waldstätter was built using her hull. This ship was then in use until 2001, when it was scrapped.	
1905	Raleigh	#388	125	Six paddle steamers for the London County Council's short-lived river service on the Thames. Length overall 40.8 metres (134.0 ft). They did up to 11.5 knots on trials. The Ben Johnson was sold in 1909 to the Steamship Company of Lake Lucerne where she was rebuilt and rechristened Rhein, and in use on Lake Lucerne until 1939. From 1946 to 1949, the motor ship Waldstätter was built using her hull. This ship was then in use until 2001, when it was scrapped.	
1905	Shakespeare	#389	125	Six paddle steamers for the London County Council's short-lived river service on the Thames. Length overall 40.8 metres (134.0 ft). They did up to 11.5 knots on trials. The Ben Johnson was sold in 1909 to the Steamship Company of Lake Lucerne where she was rebuilt and rechristened Rhein, and in use on Lake Lucerne until 1939. From 1946 to 1949, the motor ship Waldstätter was built using her hull. This ship was then in use until 2001, when it was scrapped.	
1905	Ben Johnson	#390	125	Six paddle steamers for the London County Council's short-lived river service on the Thames. Length overall 40.8 metres (134.0 ft). They did up to 11.5 knots on trials. The Ben Johnson was sold in 1909 to the Steamship Company of Lake Lucerne where she was rebuilt and rechristened Rhein, and in use on Lake Lucerne until 1939. From 1946 to 1949, the motor ship Waldstätter was built using her hull. This ship was then in use until 2001, when it was scrapped.	
1905	Michael Henry	#396	?	Motor launch, 55 feet (17 m) length, built for R. Kolbe.	
1906	?	#413	?	Open launch, 35 feet (11 m) o.a. length, built for E. T. Delmage.	
1905	Veradaise	#421	?	Wooden motor launch, 25 feet (7.6 m) length, built for Macandre Forbes or for R. Kolbe.	
1906	Nova Goa	#422	?	Launch, 49 feet (15 m) o.a. length, built for the governor of Nova Goa.	
1906	Branwen	#423	122	Steam yacht, 135 feet (41 m) length overall, powered by a triple expansion engine, built for Lord Howard de Walden launched 28 October 1905.	
1905	Poderoso	#424	?	Steam tug, 80 feet (24 m) length, built for the Buenos Aires and Pacific Railway for serviuce at Bahia Blanca.	
1908	HMS Tartar	#425	870	Thornycroft delivered one of the five Tribal-class destroyers in the Admiralty's 1905–06 Programme. The steam turbine vessel did 37.4 knots on trials and was described as the fastest ship of her day. The four funnels were lengthened in 1911 in order to get boiler gases away from the bridge. Sold in 1921 and broken up.	
1906	Princess Royal	430	428	Passenger paddle-steamer, built for Southampton, Isle of Wight & South of England RMSP Co Ltd, but rejected by them. In 1908 sold to Cosens & Co Ltd and renamed Emperor of India. In 1916 taken over by the Royal Navy as Emperor of India II, changed in 1918 to Mahratta. From 1920 she was back with Cosens and Co as Emperor of India, with a short interlude 1944–1945 when she was again in the Royal Navy, this time as Bunting. Withdrawn in 1956 and scrapped in 1957.	
1907	Egypt	457	500	Paddle steamer, built for Thomas Cook for service in Egypt.	
1907	Amapá	459	177	River gunboat for the Brazilian Navy. naval.com.br describes it as built by Yarrow at Poplar.	
1908 - 1909	HMTB 19	#468	280	Four vessels of the Cricket-class of coastal destroyers. Length 51.2 metres (168.0 ft).	
1908 - 1909	HMTB 20	#469	280	Four vessels of the Cricket-class of coastal destroyers. Length 51.2 metres (168.0 ft).	
1908 - 1909	HMTB 31	#493	287	Four vessels of the Cricket-class of coastal destroyers. Length 51.2 metres (168.0 ft).	
1908 - 1909	HMTB 32	#494	287	Four vessels of the Cricket-class of coastal destroyers. Length 51.2 metres (168.0 ft).	
1908	Acreano	#491	110	Passenger ship for Brazil.	
1908	Suriya Monthon	#492	225	Gunboat for Thailand ("Siam" at the time). Discarded in 1935.	
1908	Paso de Obligado	506	682	Three steamers for the Marina Mercante Argentina S. A.. Paso de Obligado was sold to French owners in 1920 and renamed Collobrieres, but in 1929 it went back to Argentina with its original name. Discarded around 1947. Paso de la Patria was also sold to France in 1920, renamed Cavalaira and in 1925 Ivolina. Wrecked in 1926. Paso de Cuevas went to France in 1918 as Carnoules and then to Uruguay 1928 as first Ciudad del Salto and in 1934 Enrique J. Vidal. She was back in Argentina in 1944 as Cupalen, with a last spell in 1969 as Don Maximo. Last mentioned in 1978.	
1908	Paso de la Patria	508	682		
1909	Paso de Cuevas	507	682		
1909	HMS Amazon	471	986	Thornycroft delivered one of the two Tribal-class destroyers in the Admiralty's 1906–07 Programme. Sold in 1919 and broken up.	
1909	HMS Nubian	501	985	Thornycroft delivered one of the five Tribal-class destroyers in the Admiralty's 1907–08 Programme. The ship ended her career under the original name in October 1916, when her bow was destroyed by a torpedo. The midsection and stern were joined to the bow of the mine-damaged Zulu, and the resulting ship became HMS Zubian.	
1909	Paso de San Lorenzo	509	703	Two steamers for the Marina Mercante Argentina S. A. Paso de San Lorenzo went to France in 1918 as Cuers and back to Argentina in 1924 as Jenny and later in 1924 Apipe. Foundered and sank in 1940. Paso de Martín García went to France in 1918 as Cogolin and back to Argentina in 1924 as Amalita. In 1926 she got her original name back and kept it, even during a spell in Paraguay in 1937–1939. Deleted in 1964.	
1909	Paso de Martín García	510	703	Two steamers for the Marina Mercante Argentina S. A. Paso de San Lorenzo went to France in 1918 as Cuers and back to Argentina in 1924 as Jenny and later in 1924 Apipe. Foundered and sank in 1940. Paso de Martín García went to France in 1918 as Cogolin and back to Argentina in 1924 as Amalita. In 1926 she got her original name back and kept it, even during a spell in Paraguay in 1937–1939. Deleted in 1964.	
1909	Shutung	515	136	Tug, built for British owners.	
1910	HMS Savage	519	897	Thornycroft delivered one of the 16 Beagle-class destroyers in the Admiralty's 1908–09 Programme. Broken up in 1921.	
1910	Miranda	521	793	Large yacht for Lord Leith of Fyvie. Taken over by the Royal Navy in 1915 and renamed Miranda II. In 1919 taken over by the Corporation of the Trinity House and named Patricia. Renamed as Patricia II in 1938 and Vestal in 1939. Sold to the government of Iraq in 1947. Broken up in Belgium in 1949.	
1910	Vulcano	535	151	A minelayer for the Navy of Portugal. Discarded in the late 1940s.	
1910	Arabia	561	236	A paddle-steamer passenger ship, registered in Egypt by T. Cook and Son.	
1911	HMS Larne	539	730	The Admiralty's 1909–10 Programme for destroyers consisted of the 20 Acorn-class units. Thornycroft built four of these. Larne and Lyra were sold for scrap in 1921, Martin in 1920, while Minstrel became the Japanese Sendan in 1917, returned in 1919 and scrapped in 1921.	
1911	HMS Lyra	540	730	The Admiralty's 1909–10 Programme for destroyers consisted of the 20 Acorn-class units. Thornycroft built four of these. Larne and Lyra were sold for scrap in 1921, Martin in 1920, while Minstrel became the Japanese Sendan in 1917, returned in 1919 and scrapped in 1921.	
1911	HMS Martin	541	730	The Admiralty's 1909–10 Programme for destroyers consisted of the 20 Acorn-class units. Thornycroft built four of these. Larne and Lyra were sold for scrap in 1921, Martin in 1920, while Minstrel became the Japanese Sendan in 1917, returned in 1919 and scrapped in 1921.	
1911	HMS Minstrel	542	730	The Admiralty's 1909–10 Programme for destroyers consisted of the 20 Acorn-class units. Thornycroft built four of these. Larne and Lyra were sold for scrap in 1921, Martin in 1920, while Minstrel became the Japanese Sendan in 1917, returned in 1919 and scrapped in 1921.	
1911	HMS Acheron	559	773	The Admiralty's 1910–11 Programme for destroyers consisted of the 23 Acheron-class units. Thornycroft built two of these. HMS Acheron was sold in 1921. HMS Ariel was converted to a fast minelayer in 1917 and was lost to mines in August 1918.	
1912	HMS Ariel	560	763	The Admiralty's 1910–11 Programme for destroyers consisted of the 23 Acheron-class units. Thornycroft built two of these. HMS Acheron was sold in 1921. HMS Ariel was converted to a fast minelayer in 1917 and was lost to mines in August 1918.	
1911	Marynthea	567	886	A large steam yacht, built for Henry J. Mason. In 1919 sold to Arthur Du Cros and named Emerald. In 1922 it was acquired by Philip H. du Cross, and in 1926 by Harry Gordon Selfridge, who changed the name to Conqueror. In 1934 the yacht was sold to Hugh Cunliffe-Owen and in 1939 to the Marwell Sailing Company Ltd. In 1947 she was registered in Panama as Patris, owned by Lamira Cia de Vapores SA. In 1948 she was registered in Greece as Marie, owned by G.P.Hadoulis & Partners, and in 1949 as Costakis Toyias, owned by Evangelos Toyias- Finally in 1960 she became Marilena, owned by S. Lagos. Broken up in 1979.	
1911	Catherine Lawrence	616	119	Two tugs, sold to Chile, and registered in Antofagasta.	
1911	Alida Harvey	617	117	Two tugs, sold to Chile, and registered in Antofagasta.	
1913	HMS Hardy	621	898	The Admiralty's 1911–12 Programme for destroyers consisted of the 20 Acasta-class units. Thornycroft built five of these. Hardy was sold in 1921, Paragon was torpedoed by a German destroyer in March 1917. Porpoise was sold to Brazil in 1920 as Alexandrino Deaenca, changed in 1927 to Maranhao. Discarded in 1945. Unity was sold in 1922 and Victor in 1923.	
1913	HMS Paragon	633	917	The Admiralty's 1911–12 Programme for destroyers consisted of the 20 Acasta-class units. Thornycroft built five of these. Hardy was sold in 1921, Paragon was torpedoed by a German destroyer in March 1917. Porpoise was sold to Brazil in 1920 as Alexandrino Deaenca, changed in 1927 to Maranhao. Discarded in 1945. Unity was sold in 1922 and Victor in 1923.	
1914	HMS Porpoise	634	934	The Admiralty's 1911–12 Programme for destroyers consisted of the 20 Acasta-class units. Thornycroft built five of these. Hardy was sold in 1921, Paragon was torpedoed by a German destroyer in March 1917. Porpoise was sold to Brazil in 1920 as Alexandrino Deaenca, changed in 1927 to Maranhao. Discarded in 1945. Unity was sold in 1922 and Victor in 1923.	
1914	HMS Unity	635	954	The Admiralty's 1911–12 Programme for destroyers consisted of the 20 Acasta-class units. Thornycroft built five of these. Hardy was sold in 1921, Paragon was torpedoed by a German destroyer in March 1917. Porpoise was sold to Brazil in 1920 as Alexandrino Deaenca, changed in 1927 to Maranhao. Discarded in 1945. Unity was sold in 1922 and Victor in 1923.	
1914	HMS Victor	636	954	The Admiralty's 1911–12 Programme for destroyers consisted of the 20 Acasta-class units. Thornycroft built five of these. Hardy was sold in 1921, Paragon was torpedoed by a German destroyer in March 1917. Porpoise was sold to Brazil in 1920 as Alexandrino Deaenca, changed in 1927 to Maranhao. Discarded in 1945. Unity was sold in 1922 and Victor in 1923.	
1913	St. Patrick	663	341	Passenger and cargo steamer, built for the Government of Trinidad and registered in Port of Spain. In 1931 she was sold to CA Venezolana de Nav in Ciudad Bolivar and renamed Casacoima. Deleted in 1951.	
1914	HMS Lance	653	997	The Admiralty's 1912–13 Programme for destroyers consisted of the 20 Laforey-class units (Later known as the L class). Thornycroft built two of these. HMS Lance is credited with having fired the first shot of the Naval War in World War I. On 5 August 1914 she sank the German minelayer SMS Königin Luise, which was caught while laying mines in the Thames estuary. Scrapped 1921 and 1922 respectively.	
1914	HMS Lookout	654	1,002	The Admiralty's 1912–13 Programme for destroyers consisted of the 20 Laforey-class units (Later known as the L class). Thornycroft built two of these. HMS Lance is credited with having fired the first shot of the Naval War in World War I. On 5 August 1914 she sank the German minelayer SMS Königin Luise, which was caught while laying mines in the Thames estuary. Scrapped 1921 and 1922 respectively.	
1914	CGS Margaret	679	756	A customs vessel for the Government of Canada. In August 1914 she was transferred to the Canadian Navy and became the patrol vessel HMCS Margaret. Went back to customs work in 1919. Sold to Brazil in 1932 and became the surveying ship Rio Branco. Did patrol work in the Second World War. Discarded in 1957 or 1958.	
1914	HMS Meteor	696	1,070	Thornycroft built their own version of the Admiralty's M-class destroyer design, the six units known as the Thornycroft M-class destroyers. HMS Meteor and HMS Mastiff were sold in 1921. HMS Patrician and HMS Patriot were transferred to the Royal Canadian Navy in 1920. Both broken up in 1929. HMS Rapid was sold in 1927 and HMS Ready in 1926.	
1914	HMS Mastiff	697	1,070	Thornycroft built their own version of the Admiralty's M-class destroyer design, the six units known as the Thornycroft M-class destroyers. HMS Meteor and HMS Mastiff were sold in 1921. HMS Patrician and HMS Patriot were transferred to the Royal Canadian Navy in 1920. Both broken up in 1929. HMS Rapid was sold in 1927 and HMS Ready in 1926.	
1916	HMS Patrician	805	1,004	Thornycroft built their own version of the Admiralty's M-class destroyer design, the six units known as the Thornycroft M-class destroyers. HMS Meteor and HMS Mastiff were sold in 1921. HMS Patrician and HMS Patriot were transferred to the Royal Canadian Navy in 1920. Both broken up in 1929. HMS Rapid was sold in 1927 and HMS Ready in 1926.	
1916	HMS Patriot	806	1,004	Thornycroft built their own version of the Admiralty's M-class destroyer design, the six units known as the Thornycroft M-class destroyers. HMS Meteor and HMS Mastiff were sold in 1921. HMS Patrician and HMS Patriot were transferred to the Royal Canadian Navy in 1920. Both broken up in 1929. HMS Rapid was sold in 1927 and HMS Ready in 1926.	
1916	HMS Rapid	827	1,033	Thornycroft built their own version of the Admiralty's M-class destroyer design, the six units known as the Thornycroft M-class destroyers. HMS Meteor and HMS Mastiff were sold in 1921. HMS Patrician and HMS Patriot were transferred to the Royal Canadian Navy in 1920. Both broken up in 1929. HMS Rapid was sold in 1927 and HMS Ready in 1926.	
1916	HMS Ready	828	1,033	Thornycroft built their own version of the Admiralty's M-class destroyer design, the six units known as the Thornycroft M-class destroyers. HMS Meteor and HMS Mastiff were sold in 1921. HMS Patrician and HMS Patriot were transferred to the Royal Canadian Navy in 1920. Both broken up in 1929. HMS Rapid was sold in 1927 and HMS Ready in 1926.	
1914	Ona	723	345	Two tugs for the Navy of Argentina. They were given the pennant numbers R-9 and R-10. Ona was probably phased out in the 1960s, while her sister was broken up around 1971.	
1914	Querandi	724	345	Two tugs for the Navy of Argentina. They were given the pennant numbers R-9 and R-10. Ona was probably phased out in the 1960s, while her sister was broken up around 1971.	
1915	Sprite	761	414	A tug for the Royal Navy.	
1915	Veteran	768	690	A tug for the Royal Navy.	
1915	HMS Michael	773	1,003	Thornycroft built six of the standard Admiralty M-class destroyers. All were sold for scrap in 1921.	
1915	HMS Milbrook	774	1,007	Thornycroft built six of the standard Admiralty M-class destroyers. All were sold for scrap in 1921.	
1915	HMS Minion	775	1,007	Thornycroft built six of the standard Admiralty M-class destroyers. All were sold for scrap in 1921.	
1916	HMS Munster	776	1,001	Thornycroft built six of the standard Admiralty M-class destroyers. All were sold for scrap in 1921.	
1916	HMS Nepean	789	1,025	Thornycroft built six of the standard Admiralty M-class destroyers. All were sold for scrap in 1921.	
1916	HMS Nereus	790	1,025	Thornycroft built six of the standard Admiralty M-class destroyers. All were sold for scrap in 1921.	
1916	HMS F3	751	353	Thornycroft built one of the three F-class submarines for the Royal Navy. It was broken up in 1920.	
1916	Pert	764	1,023	A tug for the Royal Navy.	
1916	HMS E33	784	662	Thornycroft built two units of the E class of submarines for the Royal Navy. HMS E33 was sold in 1922 and HMS E34 was mined in July 1918.	
1917	HMS E34	785	658	Thornycroft built two units of the E class of submarines for the Royal Navy. HMS E33 was sold in 1922 and HMS E34 was mined in July 1918.	
1916	HMS Rosalind	850	1,037	Thornycroft built their own version of the Admiralty's R-class destroyer design, the five units known as the Thornycroft R-class destroyers. HMS Teazer did just over 40 knots on her trials in 1917, making her the fastest destroyer in the world at the time. HMS Rosalind was sold for scrap in 1926 and HMS Radiant was sold to the Thai Navy in 1920 and became Phra Ruang, serving until the middle of the 1960s. HMS Retriever was sold in 1927, HMS Taurus in 1930 and HMS Teazer in 1931.	
1917	HMS Radiant	851	1,035	Thornycroft built their own version of the Admiralty's R-class destroyer design, the five units known as the Thornycroft R-class destroyers. HMS Teazer did just over 40 knots on her trials in 1917, making her the fastest destroyer in the world at the time. HMS Rosalind was sold for scrap in 1926 and HMS Radiant was sold to the Thai Navy in 1920 and became Phra Ruang, serving until the middle of the 1960s. HMS Retriever was sold in 1927, HMS Taurus in 1930 and HMS Teazer in 1931.	
1917	HMS Retriever	852	1,034	Thornycroft built their own version of the Admiralty's R-class destroyer design, the five units known as the Thornycroft R-class destroyers. HMS Teazer did just over 40 knots on her trials in 1917, making her the fastest destroyer in the world at the time. HMS Rosalind was sold for scrap in 1926 and HMS Radiant was sold to the Thai Navy in 1920 and became Phra Ruang, serving until the middle of the 1960s. HMS Retriever was sold in 1927, HMS Taurus in 1930 and HMS Teazer in 1931.	
1917	HMS Taurus	871	1,065	Thornycroft built their own version of the Admiralty's R-class destroyer design, the five units known as the Thornycroft R-class destroyers. HMS Teazer did just over 40 knots on her trials in 1917, making her the fastest destroyer in the world at the time. HMS Rosalind was sold for scrap in 1926 and HMS Radiant was sold to the Thai Navy in 1920 and became Phra Ruang, serving until the middle of the 1960s. HMS Retriever was sold in 1927, HMS Taurus in 1930 and HMS Teazer in 1931.	
1917	HMS Teazer	872	1,065	Thornycroft built their own version of the Admiralty's R-class destroyer design, the five units known as the Thornycroft R-class destroyers. HMS Teazer did just over 40 knots on her trials in 1917, making her the fastest destroyer in the world at the time. HMS Rosalind was sold for scrap in 1926 and HMS Radiant was sold to the Thai Navy in 1920 and became Phra Ruang, serving until the middle of the 1960s. HMS Retriever was sold in 1927, HMS Taurus in 1930 and HMS Teazer in 1931.	
1917	HMS Shakespeare	903	1,750	Admiral Jellicoe of the Royal Navy was concerned that the light cruisers of the day were not fast enough to lead the destroyer flotillas. On his request Thornycroft built five flotilla leaders - first three shown here - which were larger and better armed than conventional destroyers. HMS Shakespeare and HMS Spenser were sold for scrap in 1936, but HMS Wallace served until 1945.	
1917	HMS Spenser	904	1,750	Admiral Jellicoe of the Royal Navy was concerned that the light cruisers of the day were not fast enough to lead the destroyer flotillas. On his request Thornycroft built five flotilla leaders - first three shown here - which were larger and better armed than conventional destroyers. HMS Shakespeare and HMS Spenser were sold for scrap in 1936, but HMS Wallace served until 1945.	
1919	HMS Wallace	965	1,750	Admiral Jellicoe of the Royal Navy was concerned that the light cruisers of the day were not fast enough to lead the destroyer flotillas. On his request Thornycroft built five flotilla leaders - first three shown here - which were larger and better armed than conventional destroyers. HMS Shakespeare and HMS Spenser were sold for scrap in 1936, but HMS Wallace served until 1945.	
1917	HMS Hyderabad	966	595	Gunboat for the Royal Navy. In 1921 sold to civilian service and became the Greek freighter Lemnos.	
1918	HMS Viceroy	929	1,120	Thornycroft also built their own version of the Admiralty's V and W-class destroyer design, the four units known as the Thornycroft V and W-class destroyers. HMS Viceroy was sold in 1948, HMS Viscount in 1945, HMS Wolsey and HMS Woolston in 1947.	
1918	HMS Viscount	930	1,120	Thornycroft also built their own version of the Admiralty's V and W-class destroyer design, the four units known as the Thornycroft V and W-class destroyers. HMS Viceroy was sold in 1948, HMS Viscount in 1945, HMS Wolsey and HMS Woolston in 1947.	
1918	HMS Wolsey	953	1,120	Thornycroft also built their own version of the Admiralty's V and W-class destroyer design, the four units known as the Thornycroft V and W-class destroyers. HMS Viceroy was sold in 1948, HMS Viscount in 1945, HMS Wolsey and HMS Woolston in 1947.	
1918	HMS Woolston	954	1,120	Thornycroft also built their own version of the Admiralty's V and W-class destroyer design, the four units known as the Thornycroft V and W-class destroyers. HMS Viceroy was sold in 1948, HMS Viscount in 1945, HMS Wolsey and HMS Woolston in 1947.	
1918	HMS Speedy	961	1,092	The Admiralty's S-class destroyer also had a Thornycroft version, the five units known as the Thornycroft S-class destroyers. HMS Speedy was sunk in a collision in September 1922, and HMS Tobago was mined in November 1920. HMS Torbay and HMS Toreador were transferred to the Royal Canadian Navy in 1928 and became HMCS Champlain and Vancouver, and broken up in 1937. HMS Tourmaline was sold in 1931.	
1918	HMS Tobago	962	1,092	The Admiralty's S-class destroyer also had a Thornycroft version, the five units known as the Thornycroft S-class destroyers. HMS Speedy was sunk in a collision in September 1922, and HMS Tobago was mined in November 1920. HMS Torbay and HMS Toreador were transferred to the Royal Canadian Navy in 1928 and became HMCS Champlain and Vancouver, and broken up in 1937. HMS Tourmaline was sold in 1931.	
1919	HMS Torbay	968	1,092	The Admiralty's S-class destroyer also had a Thornycroft version, the five units known as the Thornycroft S-class destroyers. HMS Speedy was sunk in a collision in September 1922, and HMS Tobago was mined in November 1920. HMS Torbay and HMS Toreador were transferred to the Royal Canadian Navy in 1928 and became HMCS Champlain and Vancouver, and broken up in 1937. HMS Tourmaline was sold in 1931.	
1919	HMS Toreador	969	1,092	The Admiralty's S-class destroyer also had a Thornycroft version, the five units known as the Thornycroft S-class destroyers. HMS Speedy was sunk in a collision in September 1922, and HMS Tobago was mined in November 1920. HMS Torbay and HMS Toreador were transferred to the Royal Canadian Navy in 1928 and became HMCS Champlain and Vancouver, and broken up in 1937. HMS Tourmaline was sold in 1931.	
1919	HMS Tourmaline	970	1,092	The Admiralty's S-class destroyer also had a Thornycroft version, the five units known as the Thornycroft S-class destroyers. HMS Speedy was sunk in a collision in September 1922, and HMS Tobago was mined in November 1920. HMS Torbay and HMS Toreador were transferred to the Royal Canadian Navy in 1928 and became HMCS Champlain and Vancouver, and broken up in 1937. HMS Tourmaline was sold in 1931.	
1919	HMS Roysterer	967	839	A Rollicker-class rescue tug for the Royal Navy.	
1920	HMS Wishart	978	1,140	Thornycroft also built their own version of the Admiralty's Modified W-class destroyer. The second unit, HMS Witch, was launched at Woolston in 1919, but was later towed to the HM Dockyard at Devonport and eventually completed there in 1924. Sold for breaking up in 1945 and 1946, respectively.	
1924	HMS Witch	979	1,140	Thornycroft also built their own version of the Admiralty's Modified W-class destroyer. The second unit, HMS Witch, was launched at Woolston in 1919, but was later towed to the HM Dockyard at Devonport and eventually completed there in 1924. Sold for breaking up in 1945 and 1946, respectively.	
1920	Meandros	986	2,498	A cargo ship, delivered to the Greek National Steamship Company, based at Andros. Sold to the Norwegian Nidaros shipping company in 1925 and renamed Nidarholm. From 1931 she was registered in Finland.	
1920	Ville de Saint Amarin	987	1,425	Two cargo steamers, built for the Groupement Industriel de Charbons et de Transports in Rouen, France. Ville de Saint Amarin was sold to owners in Cardiff in 1922 and was subsequently named Tudor King, Liverpool Rover and Roverlock. In 1948 she was sold to Chinese owners as An Lien. Ville de Dannemarie went to Newcastle as Greatend in 1921, and was sold to Spain in 1941 as Castillo Norena and later Margara.	
1920	Ville de Dannemarie	988	1,424	Two cargo steamers, built for the Groupement Industriel de Charbons et de Transports in Rouen, France. Ville de Saint Amarin was sold to owners in Cardiff in 1922 and was subsequently named Tudor King, Liverpool Rover and Roverlock. In 1948 she was sold to Chinese owners as An Lien. Ville de Dannemarie went to Newcastle as Greatend in 1921, and was sold to Spain in 1941 as Castillo Norena and later Margara.	
1921	Elizabeth Stoner	990	2,498	This cargo ship was delivered to J. Stoner & Co. in Southampton in 1921, sold the following year to the Scindia Steam Navigation Company Ltd., being renamed as Jalatarang in 1923. She was sunk by the Japanese submarine I-64 in the vicinity of Rangoon on 30 January 1942.	
1921	Sir James Bell	991	2,496	A cargo steamer for the Belleview Shipping Company in Hull. In 1931 it was sold to Curt Mattson in Helsinki and named Aldebaran. In 1933 it was sold again, this time to the Baltic Shipping Company in Leningrad, and named Kotlin.	
1921	St Senan	992	515	Two cargo ships for Cargo Steamships Co Ltd in Southampton. St. Senan was sold to A.F.Henry & MacGregor Ltd in Leith in 1925 and named Dunnet Head. Slievenamon was sold to John S.Monks Ltd in Liverpool in 1924 and named Monksville.	
1921	Slievenamon	993	514	Two cargo ships for Cargo Steamships Co Ltd in Southampton. St. Senan was sold to A.F.Henry & MacGregor Ltd in Leith in 1925 and named Dunnet Head. Slievenamon was sold to John S.Monks Ltd in Liverpool in 1924 and named Monksville.	
1921	Sjømand	997	2,820	A steam tanker for the Norwegian A/S Laboremus in Oslo. The original steam turbines were replaced with a Norwegian-built steam engine in 1927. Sold in 1933 to the Peruvian Navy and named Parinas. Scrapped in 1961.	
1921	Liscard	1004	734	Two luggage boats for the Borough of Wallasey at Liverpool. Liscard was converted to a floating crane and taken over by the Government in 1943. In 1946 it was sold to the D/S Hetland A/S in Copenhagen, converted to a salvage vessel and renamed Lisca. Taken over by Henry Andersen in 1949 and by K.H. Andersen in 1952. In 1956 sold to Eisen u.Metall KG Lehr & Co of Hamburg as Gluckauf. Ownership passed to Eisen u.Metall AG z/n Hamburg in 1960. Broken up in 1965. IMO 5132573. Leasowe had a less eventful career, being sold for scrap in 1948.	
1921	Leasowe	1005	734		
1922	Bellasco	994	2,494	A cargo steamship for the Dover Shipping Company Ltd. in Hull. In 1933 sold to the Norwegian Wallem & Co A/S and named Moviken. In 1934 sold to China as Chung Hsing. Became the Japanese Hengshan Maru in 1938. Registered in Taiwan from 1949, first as Yuan Hsing and from 1950 as An Lung.	
1921	Maid of Spetsai	1000	1,511	Two cargo ships for the Byron Steamship Company Ltd in London. Maid of Spetsai was lost in a collision in January 1924. Maid of Hydra was sold to Soc. Naviera Chilena de Transportes in Valparaíso, Chile, in 1927 and named Republica. She was lost in a fire in July 1928.	
1922	Maid of Hydra	1001	1,511	Two cargo ships for the Byron Steamship Company Ltd in London. Maid of Spetsai was lost in a collision in January 1924. Maid of Hydra was sold to Soc. Naviera Chilena de Transportes in Valparaíso, Chile, in 1927 and named Republica. She was lost in a fire in July 1928.	
1922	Llys-Helig	1013	157	A motor yacht, built for W.E. Corlett. Later a tender for Radio Caroline and then in use as a houseboat in Essex. Currently undergoing restoration.	
1923	Canute	1014	271	A tug, launched in December 1922 and completed in February 1923.	
1924	Luna	1024	242	Two diesel-engine lightships for the Port of Calcutta	
1924	Star	1025	242	Two diesel-engine lightships for the Port of Calcutta	
1924	Neptuno	1027	122	A tug for Brazil	
1924	Pioneer	1028	281	A pilot vessel, launched in May 1924 and delivered in August of that year.	
1924	Koodoo	1029	119	A tug, launched in June 1924 and delivered in August of that year. Scuttled in 1960.	
1924	Jamnagar	1030	576	A cargo steamship, delivered to the Maharajah Jam Sahib of Nawanagar. In 1944 taken over by the British Government as Empire Bulbul. In 1947 sold to Greek owners, named Hellenic Bulbul and based in Hong Kong for the China Hellenic Lines Ltd. Wrecked in 1948.	
1924	Satellite	1033	491	A steam-powered buoy- and lighthouse tender, built for the Corporation of the Trinity House. Broken up in 1962.	
1924	Ether	1036	101	A small diesel-engine tanker, built for Salamon & Co in Great Britain.	
1924	Shanklin	1037	412	A paddle-steamer for the Southern Railway, ferrying passengers between Portsmouth Harbour and Ryde Pier. Sold to Cosens & Co Ltd in 1951 and renamed Monarch. Taken out of service 1961 and scrapped.	
1924	Southend Britannia	1038	147	A diesel-engine passenger ship for the Britannia Motor Boat Company in Southend-on-Sea. She was one of the small ships that took part in the Dunkirk evacuation.	
1924	Sir William Macintosh	1039	226	Steam-engine tug, delivered to the Department of Railways & Harbours in South Africa, and based in Port Elizabeth. In 1937 the tug was sold to the James Dredging, Towage & Transport Co Ltd, being named Protea in 1938. Later in 1938, she was sold to the Tees Towing Company Ltd, renamed Euston Cross, and based in Middlesbrough. From 1960 she had Greek owners, was based in Piraeus and named respectively Thiseus, Ioannis Matsas and Thiseus again. Broken up in Greece in 1981.	
1925	HMS Keppel	982	1,750	The last two Thornycroft leaders were both launched in 1920 (Broke as Rooke, renamed 1921), but then work stopped. They were completed at Pembroke Dock in 1925. Keppel was broken up in 1945 and Broke sank after sustaining artillery fire in November 1942.	
1925	HMS Broke	983	1,750	The last two Thornycroft leaders were both launched in 1920 (Broke as Rooke, renamed 1921), but then work stopped. They were completed at Pembroke Dock in 1925. Keppel was broken up in 1945 and Broke sank after sustaining artillery fire in November 1942.	
1925	Beacon	1042	490	A steam-powered buoy- and lighthouse tender, built for the Corporation of the Trinity House. Broken up in 1960.	
1925	Fushun	1043	577	A passenger and cargo steamer, built for Fung K. Yu of Southampton. Registered in Italy 1927 and in Bremen 1928. From 1930 based in Shanghai, first as Fooshun and from 1932 as Ming Chu. Not mentioned after 1945.	
1926	Clausentum	1049	268	A tug, based in Southampton.	
1926	Kassed Kheir	1050	1,330	A large paddle-steamer yacht, built for the Government of Egypt.	
1926	Imbuhy	1060	480	A ferry for the Cia Cantereira e Viacao Fluminense in Rio de Janeiro, Brazil.	
1926	Portman	1061	335	A diesel-engine cargo ship for Argentina, registered in Buenos Aires. Deleted in 1986.	
1927	HMS Amazon	1040	1,352	Built as a prototype for new destroyer construction for the Royal Navy (along with Yarrow's competing HMS Ambuscade). The Amazon design was chosen. Broken up in 1948.	
1927	El Buaro	1062	259	A small tanker for Ecuador.	
1928	Estácio Coimbra	1080	271	A tug for Brazil.	
1928	Serrano	1073	1,090	The six Serrano-class destroyers were built for the Navy of Chile, and were based on Thornycroft's design of Amazon. Aldea was discarded in 1957, Videla in 1960, Hyatt and Riquelme in 1963, and Serrano and Orella in 1967.	
1929	Orella	1074	1,090	The six Serrano-class destroyers were built for the Navy of Chile, and were based on Thornycroft's design of Amazon. Aldea was discarded in 1957, Videla in 1960, Hyatt and Riquelme in 1963, and Serrano and Orella in 1967.	
1929	Riquelme	1075	1,090	The six Serrano-class destroyers were built for the Navy of Chile, and were based on Thornycroft's design of Amazon. Aldea was discarded in 1957, Videla in 1960, Hyatt and Riquelme in 1963, and Serrano and Orella in 1967.	
1929	Hyatt	1076	1,090	The six Serrano-class destroyers were built for the Navy of Chile, and were based on Thornycroft's design of Amazon. Aldea was discarded in 1957, Videla in 1960, Hyatt and Riquelme in 1963, and Serrano and Orella in 1967.	
1929	Videla	1077	1,090	The six Serrano-class destroyers were built for the Navy of Chile, and were based on Thornycroft's design of Amazon. Aldea was discarded in 1957, Videla in 1960, Hyatt and Riquelme in 1963, and Serrano and Orella in 1967.	
1929	Aldea	1078	1,090	The six Serrano-class destroyers were built for the Navy of Chile, and were based on Thornycroft's design of Amazon. Aldea was discarded in 1957, Videla in 1960, Hyatt and Riquelme in 1963, and Serrano and Orella in 1967.	
1929	Martinetta	1087	99	A motor yacht built for A.G. Lomax. In 1971 it was sold to the Government of Fiji and renamed Vola Silga.	
1929	Rosa	1088	400	Motor yacht, built for the Spanish count Ramón Godó.	
1928	Bovril	1081	270	Two cargo motor-ships for the Argentine Estates of Bovril Ltd, registered in Buenos Aires. Duke of Atholl was sold to Frigorifico Regional Santa Elena SA in 1974.	
1930	Duke of Atholl	1104	270	Two cargo motor-ships for the Argentine Estates of Bovril Ltd, registered in Buenos Aires. Duke of Atholl was sold to Frigorifico Regional Santa Elena SA in 1974.	
1930	Robert Coryndon	1086	205	This steamship was built as a passenger and cargo ferry for service on Lake Albert. It was launched in 1929 and then taken apart and shipped to Africa. It was wrecked in 1962 and the hull was not removed from the shore of the lake.	
1930	Calshot	1093	679	Built as a tug tender for the Southampton Isle of Wight and South of England Royal Mail Steam Packet Company Limited. In 1940 she was taken over by the Royal Navy as HMS Calshot, and she was present as one of the headquarter ships at Juno Beach at the Normandy landings. Returned to the owners at the end of WWII. In 1964 she was sold to Port & Liner Services (Ireland) Ltd and was based at Galway and renamed Galway Bay. In 1986 she was bought by the Southampton City Council and registered there, getting her old name Calshot back in 1990. Scrapped in 2022 by The Calshot Group.	
1930	Itororo	1096	316	Two diesel-engine water tankers for Cia Docas de Santos in Santos, Brazil. Itororo was broken op in 1955, and Pilões was hulked in 1950.	
1930	Pilões	1097	316	Two diesel-engine water tankers for Cia Docas de Santos in Santos, Brazil. Itororo was broken op in 1955, and Pilões was hulked in 1950.	
1930	Anna Marie	1099	337	Motor yacht, built for Danish industrialist Valdemar Graae. In 1931 she was acquired by W.E. Corlett and renamed Llys Helig. Taken over by the Royal Navy in 1939 and renamed HMS Anna Marie (FY 004). In 1941 she was named HMS Torrent. Mined and sunk off Falmouth in April 1941.	
1930	Tobago	1106	537	Steamship for the government of Trinidad. Transported passengers and cargo between the islands until sold in 1958 and 1959 to other owners, still registered in Port of Spain. Abandoned in 1963. IMO 5607256.	
1931	HMS Acheron	1083	1,350	This was Thornycroft's contribution to the A- and B-class destroyers for the Royal Navy. Struck a mine and sank in December 1940.	
1931	HMCS Saguenay	1091	1,337	Two destroyers for Canada, similar to the Royal Navy A- and B-class destroyers. Saguenay was paid off in 1945 and broken up in 1946. Skeena ran aground in a storm at Iceland in October 1944, and was lost.	
1931	HMCS Skeena	1092	1,337	Two destroyers for Canada, similar to the Royal Navy A- and B-class destroyers. Saguenay was paid off in 1945 and broken up in 1946. Skeena ran aground in a storm at Iceland in October 1944, and was lost.	
1931	Medina	1105	342	A motor-engine passenger ship for Southampton Isle of Wight and South of England Royal Mail Steam Packet Company Limited. Sold to M. H. Bland & Co Ltd in Gibraltar in 1962 and renamed Mons Abyla. Taken over by the Government of Gibraltar in 1968. For a short period in 1972 she was registered in London, but later that year sold to Marilu Intermediterranean Tpt Sg SA in Panama and renamed Marilu.	
1932	HMS Daring	1107	1,375	These two destroyers were Thornycrofts part of the C and D-class destroyers for the Royal Navy. Daring was torpedoed and sunk in February 1940. Decoy became HMCS Kootenay in 1943 and was scrapped in 1946.	
1933	HMS Decoy	1108	1,375	These two destroyers were Thornycrofts part of the C and D-class destroyers for the Royal Navy. Daring was torpedoed and sunk in February 1940. Decoy became HMCS Kootenay in 1943 and was scrapped in 1946.	
1933	Trenora	1115	856	Motor yacht built for the surgeon Ernest Gerald Stanley. He later sold it to the Duke of Sutherland, who renamed it Sans Peur. In 1939 it was taken over by the Royal Canadian Navy and fitted out as an armed yacht. She was sold to private owners in 1947.	
1934	HMS Sandpiper	1112	185	This river gunboat was dismantled upon completion and dispatched to Singapore, where it was assembled in 1934 for service on the Yangtze. Transferred to Nationalist China in 1942 and named Ying Hao. Taken over by the People's Republic of China after 1948. Discarded after 1970.	
1934	HMS Harrier	1117	815	Two minesweepers of the Halcyon class for the Royal Navy. HMS Harrier was discarded in the late 1940s and HMS Hussar was sunk in error by the RAF in August 1944.	
1935	HMS Hussar	1118	815	Two minesweepers of the Halcyon class for the Royal Navy. HMS Harrier was discarded in the late 1940s and HMS Hussar was sunk in error by the RAF in August 1944.	
1935	La Dryade	1133	152	Motor passenger ship, built for French owners.	
1936	HMS Glowworm	1125	1,350	These two destroyers constituted Thornycroft's part of the G and H-class destroyers of the Royal Navy. Both were lost in 1940.	
1936	HMS Grafton	1126	1,350	These two destroyers constituted Thornycroft's part of the G and H-class destroyers of the Royal Navy. Both were lost in 1940.	
1936	Gracie Fields	1149	393	A paddle-wheel passenger ship for Southampton Isle of Wight and South of England Royal Mail Steam Packet Company Limited. She was sunk in May 1940 while taking part in the Dunkirk evacuation.	
1936	Amazone	1154	222	A motor yacht for the Belgian officer Leon Hemeleers-Shenley.	
1937	HMS Kittiwake	1152	530	Thornycroft built two of the small Kingfisher-class sloops. After World War II, they were sold to civilian use in 1946 as Tuch Shing and Tuch Loon.	
1937	HMS Sheldrake	1153	530	Thornycroft built two of the small Kingfisher-class sloops. After World War II, they were sold to civilian use in 1946 as Tuch Shing and Tuch Loon.	
1937	Tadorna	1172	226	A motor yacht for Dutch owners (G.& W.Miesegaes).	
1938	HMS Mohawk	1158	1,960	Thornycroft built two of the 27 large Tribal-class destroyers for the Royal Navy. Mohawk was torpedoed by an Italian destroyer in April 1941, while Nubian survived the war and was sold for scrapping in 1949.	
1938	HMS Nubian	1159	1,960	Thornycroft built two of the 27 large Tribal-class destroyers for the Royal Navy. Mohawk was torpedoed by an Italian destroyer in April 1941, while Nubian survived the war and was sold for scrapping in 1949.	
1938	Shemara	1175	878	Motor yacht, built for the industrialist Bernard Docker. Taken over by the Royal Navy in 1939 as HMS Shemara, and served until 1946, when it was returned to its owners. Had major refit in 1992, and again in 2010–4, and is still in use a motor yacht.	
1938	Lasso	1176	910	Cable ship for the Royal Navy. Broken up in 1946.	
1939	HMS Pelican	1177	1,250	Thornycroft built one of the three Egret-class sloops for the Royal Navy. Saw extensive anti-submarine service in World War II. Broken up in 1958.	
1939	HMS Kashmir	1178	1,690	Thornycroft built two of the eight K-class destroyers for the Royal Navy. Kashmir was sunk by German bombers at Crete in May 1941, while Kimberley survived the war and was sold for scrap in 1949.	
1940	HMS Kimberley	1179	1,690	Thornycroft built two of the eight K-class destroyers for the Royal Navy. Kashmir was sunk by German bombers at Crete in May 1941, while Kimberley survived the war and was sold for scrap in 1949.	
1940	HMS Hesperus	1185	1,370	Thornycroft built two of the six Jurua class destroyers ordered by Brazil, and identical to the British H-class. In September all six of the class (still building) were taken over by the Royal Navy. Juruena was launched 1 August 1939 and completed in January 1940 as HMS Hearthy. The name was changed to HMS Hesperus in February 1941. Highlander was launched 19 October 1939 and completed in March 1940. Both saw extensive wartime service, and were broken up in 1947.	
1940	HMS Highlander	1186	1,370	Thornycroft built two of the six Jurua class destroyers ordered by Brazil, and identical to the British H-class. In September all six of the class (still building) were taken over by the Royal Navy. Juruena was launched 1 August 1939 and completed in January 1940 as HMS Hearthy. The name was changed to HMS Hesperus in February 1941. Highlander was launched 19 October 1939 and completed in March 1940. Both saw extensive wartime service, and were broken up in 1947.	
1941	HMS Latona	1198	2,650	Thornycroft built one of the six Abdiel-class minelayers for the Royal Navy. She was the largest Thornycroft-built warship of the war and had a short service life, sunk by enemy aircraft while supporting the garrison at Tobruk in October 1941.	
1941	Sivrihisar	1200	350	Two minelayers for the Navy of Turkey. Yuzbasi Hakki was renamed Torgud Reis in 1940. Both were discarded in 1964.	
1941	Yuzbasi Hakki	1201	350	Two minelayers for the Navy of Turkey. Yuzbasi Hakki was renamed Torgud Reis in 1940. Both were discarded in 1964.	
1941	HMAS Norman	1202	1,773	The yard at Woolston built two of the eight N-class destroyers. Both were loaned to Australia and served the war in the Far East. Norman was sold in 1958 and Nepal (launched as Norseman) in 1955.	
1942	HMAS Nepal	1203	1,773	The yard at Woolston built two of the eight N-class destroyers. Both were loaned to Australia and served the war in the Far East. Norman was sold in 1958 and Nepal (launched as Norseman) in 1955.	
1941	HMS Lauderdale	1212	1,050	These two units were Thornycroft's part of the Hunt-class Type II production. Lauderdale became the Greek Aigaion in 1946, serving until 1959 and scrapped in 1960. HMS Ledbury distinguished herself in Operation Pedestal and was finally sold for scrap in 1958.	
1942	HMS Ledbury	1213	1,050	These two units were Thornycroft's part of the Hunt-class Type II production. Lauderdale became the Greek Aigaion in 1946, serving until 1959 and scrapped in 1960. HMS Ledbury distinguished herself in Operation Pedestal and was finally sold for scrap in 1958.	
1942	HMS Opportune	1210	1,560	Thornycroft built two of the eight O-class destroyers for the Royal Navy. Both saw extensive wartime service. HMS Opportune was sold for scrap in 1955, while HMS Orwell was converted to a Type 16 frigate (with pennant F98) in 1952–1953, and finally sold for scrap in 1965.	
1942	HMS Orwell	1211	1,560	Thornycroft built two of the eight O-class destroyers for the Royal Navy. Both saw extensive wartime service. HMS Opportune was sold for scrap in 1955, while HMS Orwell was converted to a Type 16 frigate (with pennant F98) in 1952–1953, and finally sold for scrap in 1965.	
1942	HMS Brecon	1290	1,194	Thornycroft built these two vessels as their own version of the Hunt-class destroyer, known as the Type IV. Brecon was sold for scrap in 1961 and broken up the following year. Brissenden was scrapped in 1965.	
1943	HMS Brissenden		1,194	Thornycroft built these two vessels as their own version of the Hunt-class destroyer, known as the Type IV. Brecon was sold for scrap in 1961 and broken up the following year. Brissenden was scrapped in 1965.	
1943	HMIS Narbada	1385	1,300	The original Black Swan class of sloops comprised 12 units. Thornycroft delivered two, both to the Navy of India, for service in the Far East. The spelling of the second unit can be seen as both Godavari and Godaveri. After the partition of India, they became part of the Navy of Pakistan in 1948, renamed as Jhelum and Sind. They were discarded in 1959.	
1943	HMIS Godavari	1386	1,300	The original Black Swan class of sloops comprised 12 units. Thornycroft delivered two, both to the Navy of India, for service in the Far East. The spelling of the second unit can be seen as both Godavari and Godaveri. After the partition of India, they became part of the Navy of Pakistan in 1948, renamed as Jhelum and Sind. They were discarded in 1959.	
1943	HMS Magpie	4016	1,350	The modified Black Swan class of sloops (frigates) eventually comprised 25 units. Thornycroft delivered three, of which two were delivered in time to take part in the hunt for German submarines. The first two were sold for scrap in 1959 and 1958 respectively, while Actaeon was sold to West Germany in 1958. It served as Hipper until hulked in 1964. Sold for scrap in 1967.	
1944	HMS Peacock	4017	1,350	The modified Black Swan class of sloops (frigates) eventually comprised 25 units. Thornycroft delivered three, of which two were delivered in time to take part in the hunt for German submarines. The first two were sold for scrap in 1959 and 1958 respectively, while Actaeon was sold to West Germany in 1958. It served as Hipper until hulked in 1964. Sold for scrap in 1967.	
1946	HMS Actaeon	4033	1,350	The modified Black Swan class of sloops (frigates) eventually comprised 25 units. Thornycroft delivered three, of which two were delivered in time to take part in the hunt for German submarines. The first two were sold for scrap in 1959 and 1958 respectively, while Actaeon was sold to West Germany in 1958. It served as Hipper until hulked in 1964. Sold for scrap in 1967.	
1943	HMS Undine	4023	1,806	These two were Thornycroft's part of the eight U-class destroyers. In 1952–1954 Undine was converted into a Type 15 fast frigate, with pennant number F141. Ursa was similarly converted in 1953–1954, receiving pennant number F200. They were scrapped in 1965 and 1967 respectively.	
1944	HMS Ursa	4024	1,806	These two were Thornycroft's part of the eight U-class destroyers. In 1952–1954 Undine was converted into a Type 15 fast frigate, with pennant number F141. Ursa was similarly converted in 1953–1954, receiving pennant number F200. They were scrapped in 1965 and 1967 respectively.	
1944	HMS Zest	4034	1,730	Among the eight units of the Z-class destroyers were these two, built by Thornycroft. In 1954-1956 Zest was converted into a Type 15 fast frigate, with pennant number F102. She was sold in 1969 and broken up in 1970. Zodiac was sold to the Navy of Israel in 1955, renamed Yaffo and served until 1972. One of her 4.5-inch guns is preserved at the Clandestine Immigration and Naval Museum, Haifa.	
1944	HMS Zodiac	4035	1,730	Among the eight units of the Z-class destroyers were these two, built by Thornycroft. In 1954-1956 Zest was converted into a Type 15 fast frigate, with pennant number F102. She was sold in 1969 and broken up in 1970. Zodiac was sold to the Navy of Israel in 1955, renamed Yaffo and served until 1972. One of her 4.5-inch guns is preserved at the Clandestine Immigration and Naval Museum, Haifa.	
1944	HMS LCT 7035	4078	350	Not much is known about this Mark 3 Landing craft tank, launched at Thornycrofts on 26 April 1944.	
1945	HMS Chaplet	4048	1,740	Thornycroft built two of eight destroyers of the Ch' subgroup - a part of the 32 C-class destroyers. Both were delivered after the end of World War II. Chaplet received new anti-submarine weapons in 1954 and was scrapped in 1965. Charity was sold to the United States in 1958 and immediately transferred to Pakistan as Shah Jahan. During the Indo-Pakistani War of 1971 it was badly damaged by a Styx missile from INS Nipat. Although towed back to Karachi, the destroyer was found to be damaged beyond repair and was scrapped.	
1945	HMS Charity	4049	1,740		
1946	HMS Comus	4050	1,915	Thornycroft built two of eight destroyers of the Co subgroup - a part of the 32 C-class destroyers. Both were delivered after the end of World War II. Comus served in the Korean War and in the Malayan Emergency before being scrapped in 1958. Concord was launched as Corso, but renamed in 1946 before entering service. She took part in the Amethyst Incident and the Korean War. Concord was scrapped in 1962.	
1946	HMS Concord	4051	1,915	Thornycroft built two of eight destroyers of the Co subgroup - a part of the 32 C-class destroyers. Both were delivered after the end of World War II. Comus served in the Korean War and in the Malayan Emergency before being scrapped in 1958. Concord was launched as Corso, but renamed in 1946 before entering service. She took part in the Amethyst Incident and the Korean War. Concord was scrapped in 1962.	
1947	El Malek Fouad	4108	3,746	A passenger and cargo ship for the Khedivial Mail S.S. Company. In 1956 she was renamed as Nefertiti, and in 1961 sold to Tirrenia – Compagnia italiana di navigazione in Naples and given the name Olbia, (IMO 5262079). Scrapped in 1972.	
1948	HMS Crossbow	4074	1,980	Of the twenty Weapon-class destroyers ordered, Thornycroft were allotted four. A series of cancellations meant that only two of these, Crossbow and Culverin were launched, and only Crossbow was completed. In 1957–1959 the torpedo armament gave way to a large lattice mast with radar, enabling the ship to serve as radar picket for a carrier strike force. Sold for scrap in December 1971, arriving at the breakers in January 1972.	
1948	Commandant Quéré	4114	4,478	Built for the Compagnie Générale Transatlantique for service in the Mediterranean, primarily between Corsica and the French mainland. Scrapped in 1969.	
1949	Atlas	4115	500	Two tugs for the colonial government of Nigeria, based at Lagos. In 1957 both were transferred to the Nigerian Ports Authority. Atlas foundered 9 nautical miles (17 km; 10 mi) east of Lagos in August 1967. Vulcan was sold to Tsavliris (Salvage & Towage) Ltd in Piraeus in 1967, renamed Nisos Thasos, and was scrapped there in 1970.	
1949	Vulcan	4116	500	Two tugs for the colonial government of Nigeria, based at Lagos. In 1957 both were transferred to the Nigerian Ports Authority. Atlas foundered 9 nautical miles (17 km; 10 mi) east of Lagos in August 1967. Vulcan was sold to Tsavliris (Salvage & Towage) Ltd in Piraeus in 1967, renamed Nisos Thasos, and was scrapped there in 1970.	
1949	Stalwart	4117	456	A tug, built for the Calcutta Port Trust. IMO number 5337915. Not much information online - might still be floating.	
1949	Balmoral	4120	688	A car- and passenger ferry for the Red Funnel Line, used between Southampton and Cowes. Sold to P & A Campbell in 1979 and based in Bristol. In 1983 she was acquired by Craig Inns and intended for use as a floating restaurant. The project was abandoned, and Balmoral went back to the Bristol Channel in 1985, now owned by Helseam Ltd. In 1995 she was bought by the Waverley SN Co Ltd, and became part of the National Historic Fleet. In 2015 ownership was transferred to MV Balmoral Fund Limited.	
1949	Atile	4122	193	A tug, built for Anglo-Saxon Petroleum. Not much information online.	
1951	Ucayali	4126	320	Two river gunboats for the Peruvian Navy. Pennant numbers CF-14 and CF-13 respectively.	
1951	Marañón	4127	320	Two river gunboats for the Peruvian Navy. Pennant numbers CF-14 and CF-13 respectively.	
1952	HMS Duchess	4087	2,950	The yard at Woolston built one of the eight Daring-class destroyers for the Royal Navy. In 1964 she was loaned to the Royal Australian Navy, and later bought outright. Converted to training ship 1973–1974. Left active service in 1977 and was sold for scrap in 1980.	
1951	Blenheim	4123	4,766	Two passenger/cargo Ships launched at Thornycroft's and completed by Akers (Yard No. 490 and 494) in Oslo, Norway. Owned by Ganger Rolf ASA (a subsidiary of Fred. Olsen & Co. Both served on the Oslo-Kristiansand-Newcastle route, but Blenheim sustained heavy damage from a fire in 1968, and in 1969 was sold to A/S Uglands Rederi, Grimstad, Norway. Converted to car carrier (2,466 GRT) and renamed Cilaos. In 1973 sold to Ocean Car Carriers Pte Ltd in Singapore (IMO 5046334). Sold for scrap 1981 and broken up. Braemar served in Norway until 1973, when she was sold to Dashwood Finance Co Ltd of Manilla and renamed as The Philippine Tourist. (IMO 5050074). Laid up as a floating casino in 1976, and further fate is sparsely documented.	
1953	Braemar	4145	4,766		
1953	Horus	4134	337	Thornycroft sold this tug to the Cie Universelle du Canal Maritime de Suez, home port Port Said. After the Suez channel was nationalized, it was transferred to the Suez Canal Authority in 1958. Deleted in 1996. (IMO 5155331).	
1953	Vigilant	4141	728	A salvage vessel, built for the Mersey Docks and Harbour Board in Liverpool. In 1978 the name was changed to Staunch and the ship was broken up the same year. (IMO 5380170).	
1953	Hamtun	4151	318	A tug, owned by the shipyard until 1959, when it was bought by the Red Funnel Line, also at Southampton. In 1970 she was bought by Union de Remorquage et de Sauvetage SA in Antwerp, who in 1972 named her Nathalie Letzer. In 1974 she was rebuilt and rated at 394 GRT. In 1987 she was back in Britain, as Anglican Lady, owned by Klyne Tugs (Lowestoft) Ltd. In 1991, the tug went to Sault Ste Marie in Canada, now owned by Purvis Marine Ltd. (IMO 5141483). Apparently still active.	
1953	Sir Bevois	4158	318	This tug was very similar to Hamtun, and similarly owned by the shipyard until 1959, when it was bought by the Red Funnel Line, also at Southampton. In 1968 she was bought by the John Howard & Co (Northern) Ltd in Liverpool and named Amanda Howard. Broken up in 1970. (IMO 5329437)	
1955	Sechura	4159	4,297	A tanker for the Navy of Peru, pennant number ATP-54, commissioned in 1956. In 1968 sold to Veneziatankers Sas in Venice and named Monte Grappa. In 1976 sold to Francesco Saverio Salonia in Rome and named Micheleesse. Sold for scrap in 1981. (IMO 5317070)	
1955	Barana	4162	361	A tug for the government of Sri Lanka, based in Colombo. The engine broke down in 1991, and she was subsequently scrapped. (IMO 5036171)	
1956	Scillonian	4130	921	A ferry for the Isles of Scilly Steamship Company, transporting passengers and cargo between the Isles of Scilly and Penzance, Cornwall. In 1977, she was bought by P.& A.Campbell of Bristol and named Devonia. In 1982 sold to John Graham & Maureen M.Thompson of Glasgow and named Devonium. Later that same year sold to Torbay Seaways & Stevedores Ltd, who reverted the name to Devonia. In 1984 she was sold to Norse Atlantic Ferries Ltd and became the Syllingar, serving at the Orkney Islands. In 1986 she became the Remvi, now owned by the Hellenic Cruising Holidays in Piraeus. In 1989 she was sold to J.A.R.Atlantic Ocean Ltd of Belize, renamed Africa Queen, serving in West Africa. The name was changed to Princess Eliana in 1997. In 1998, she became the Olga J. owned by John Christodoulo of Belize. He abandoned her and the crew in Bourgas, Bulgaria in 1999 and she was eventually hulked there in 2007. (IMO 5315723).	
1956	Atherfield	4163	246	Two tugs for the Red Funnel Line in Southampton. Atherton became Irwing Hemlock in 1972 and Swellmaster in 1996, employed in Canada. Latest sighting January 2017. (IMO 5028605). Culver is also referred to as a fire fighting vessel. (IMO 5082895).	
1956	Culver	4164	246	Two tugs for the Red Funnel Line in Southampton. Atherton became Irwing Hemlock in 1972 and Swellmaster in 1996, employed in Canada. Latest sighting January 2017. (IMO 5028605). Culver is also referred to as a fire fighting vessel. (IMO 5082895).	
1953	HMS Coniston	4135	360	Among the 117 Ton-class minesweepers delivered to the Royal Navy were 12 built by Thornycroft.: Coniston was sold to the salvage company Metrec Ltd in 1970, and became Investic. Broken up in 1973.; Alcaston became the Australian HMAS Snipe in 1961 and was broken up in 1988.; Alfriston was RNR Warsash 1954–1958 and RNR Kilmorey 1961–1975, reverting to her old name and broken up in 1988.; Derriton was RNR Killiekrankie 1955–1960 and broken up 1971.; Oulston was sold to the Irish Naval Service in 1971, renamed LÉ Grainne (CM10). Sold for scrap 1987.; Highburton was sold for scrap in 1978.; Hickleton served in the Navy of New Zealand 1965–1966. Sold to Argentina in 1967, and became ARA Neuquen (M1). Discarded 1996.; Blaxton was sold to the Irish Naval Service in 1971, renamed LÉ Fola (CM12). Sold for scrap 1987.; Bossington was scrapped in Belgium in 1989.; Upton was scrapped in Belgium in 1991.; Walkerton was broken up in Middlesbrough in 1990.; Crofton was an RNR tender 1969–1975, carrying the name Warsash. Broken up 1987.	
1953	HMS Alcaston	4136	360		
1954	HMS Alfriston	4137	360		
1954	HMS Derriton	4152	360		
1955	HMS Oulston	4153	360		
1955	HMS Highburton	4154	360		
1955	HMS Hickleton	4155	360		
1956	HMS Blaxton	4156	360		
1956	HMS Bossington	4157	360		
1956	HMS Upton	4160	360		
1958	HMS Walkerton	4161	360		
1958	HMS Crofton	4173	360		
1957	HMS Blackwood	4149	1,200	The yard built two of the 12 Blackwood-class frigates ordered by the Royal Navy. Blackwood was originally equipped with four 21-inch (533 mm) anti-submarine torpedoes. Broken up in 1976. Duncan was relegated to harbour service in the early 1980s, decommissioned in 1984 and scrapped in 1985.	
1958	HMS Duncan	4150	1,200	The yard built two of the 12 Blackwood-class frigates ordered by the Royal Navy. Blackwood was originally equipped with four 21-inch (533 mm) anti-submarine torpedoes. Broken up in 1976. Duncan was relegated to harbour service in the early 1980s, decommissioned in 1984 and scrapped in 1985.	
1958	SAS Windhoek	4174	360	A Ton-class minesweeper, built for the South African Navy. No longer active, but fate unknown.	
1958	Dunnose	4182	241	A tug for the Red Funnel line of Southampton. In 1980 renamed Irving Willow of the Atlantic Towing Ltd in Canada, and in 1996 Wavemaster. IMO 5094953. Broken up 2005.	
1959	Carisbrooke Castle	4183	672	A ferry for the Red Funnel line of Southampton, connecting Southampton and West Cowes. In 1974 she was sold to the Societa Partenopea di Navigazione S.p.A., Naples and renamed Citta di Meta, serving between Naples and Ischia. In 1978 she was sold to Soc Campania Regionale Marittima SpA, also in Naples. In 1987 she was sold to Maregiglio S.r.l., Naples, for service between Porto Santo Stefano and Isola del Giglio, and she was named Giglio Expresso II in 1989. In 2001 ownership passed to Trasporti Regionali Marittimi Srl, connecting Calasetta and Carloforte (off the coast of Sardinia), and in 2006 to MF Maddalena Ferry Srl in Genova, before she was broken up in 2007. IMO 5063681.	
1960	HMNZS Otago	4172	2,150	A Rothesay-class frigate, ordered by the Royal Navy in 1956 as Hastings, but the order was taken over by New Zealand in 1957, and she was built as Otago. She was paid off in 1983 and sold for scrap in 1987.	
1960	Keverne	4189	260	A tug for J.P. Knight Ltd. Became Vaya con Dios in 1987, March in 2004 and Cosan I in 2009. IMO 5186031.	
1960	Gatcombe	4192	513	A tug for the Red Funnel Line of Southampton. Sold to the Bermuda Marine & Port Authority in 1969 and renamed Bermudian. Became Topsham in 1988, owned by Peninsular Sg Co Ltd. In 1989 sold to Splendid Sg Ltd of Valletta, Malta, and renamed Royal M.. Broken up in Greece in 2003. IMO 5126627.	
1961	Thorness	4194	247	A tug for the Red Funnel Line of Southampton. Became Irving Juniper in 1984, and Atlantic Juniper in 1999, based in Canada. IMO 5360106.	
1962	Osborne Castle	4196	736	A ferry for the Red Funnel Line, serving between Southampton and Cowes. Became Le Gobelet D'Argent in Canada in 1978. Renamed Le Maxim in 1989 and Cavalier Maxim in 1993. IMO 5265904.	
1963	HMS Gurkha	4180	2,300	Thornycroft delivered one of the seven Tribal-class frigates. In 1984 she was sold to Indonesia and became Wilhelmus Zakarias Yohannes, discarded in 2000.	
1963	Ikwerre	4200	289	Two apparently identical tugs. Ikwerre was delivered to the Nigerian Ports Authority in Lagos, Nigeria. (IMO 5411723). Nguvu went to the East African Railways & Harbours, later registered in Tanzania. (IMO 5412739).	
1963	Nguvu	4201	289	Two apparently identical tugs. Ikwerre was delivered to the Nigerian Ports Authority in Lagos, Nigeria. (IMO 5411723). Nguvu went to the East African Railways & Harbours, later registered in Tanzania. (IMO 5412739).	
1964	Calshot	4202	493	A tug/tender for the Red Funnel Line of Southampton. Sold to Antrefo Supplies Ltd of Southampton in 1987. Became Tara II of Dublin in 1989, owned by Dublin Bay Cruises (Ireland) Ltd. Finally, in 1992, she became Boluda Abrego of Valencia, owned by Remolques del Mediterraneo SA. Broken up in Turkey in 2012. IMO 6402717.	
1965	Chale	4208	254	A tug for the Red Funnel Line of Southampton.	
1965	Cowes Castle	4209	786	A ferry for the Red Funnel Line of Southampton. In 1975 she was converted to roll-on/roll-off, with space for 25–30 extra vehicles and measured at 912 tons. In 1993 (or 1994) sold to Javno Poduzece "Jadrolinija" PO of Rijeka, Croatia and renamed Neha. Phased out around 2010 and broken up in Turkey in 2011. IMO 6525002.	
1966	Portsmouth Queen	4211	159	Two small ferries for the Portsmouth Harbour Ferry Company, serving its subsidiary Gosport Ferry. Portsmouth Queen was sold in 2016 for service on the Thames as London Queen. Gosport Queen was sold in 2017 for service on the Thames as Pearl of London.	
1966	Gosport Queen	4212	159	Two small ferries for the Portsmouth Harbour Ferry Company, serving its subsidiary Gosport Ferry. Portsmouth Queen was sold in 2016 for service on the Thames as London Queen. Gosport Queen was sold in 2017 for service on the Thames as Pearl of London.	
	HMS Juno	4207	2,350	This Leander-class frigate was ordered from Thornycroft and launched at Woolston in 1965, but when she was delivered in 1967, the company had merged into Vosper Thornycroft.	
	HMS Abdiel	4210	1,375	This minelayer was ordered from Thornycroft, but before she was launched in 1967, the company had merged into Vosper Thornycroft.	

== See also ==
List of ships built at John I. Thornycroft & Company, Chiswick
