= HMS Seraph (1918) =

Royal Navy S class destroyer

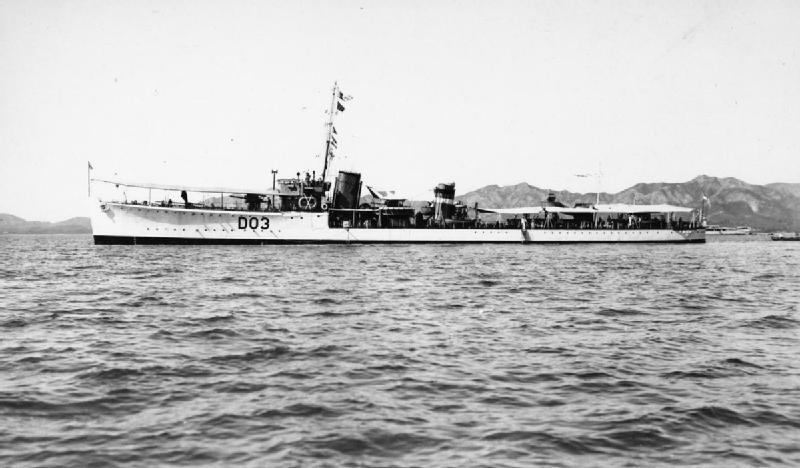
- Sister ship Sepoy also serving in China in c. 1930

History

United Kingdom
- Name: Seraph
- Namesake: Seraph
- Ordered: 7 April 1917
- Builder: Denny, Dumbarton
- Yard number: 1099
- Laid down: 10 October 1917
- Launched: 8 July 1918
- Completed: 25 December 1918
- Out of service: 7 May 1934
- Fate: Sold to be broken up

General characteristics
- Class & type: S-class destroyer
- Displacement: 1,075 long tons (1,092 t) normal; 1,221 long tons (1,241 t) deep load
- Length: 265 ft (80.8 m) p.p.
- Beam: 26 ft 8 in (8.13 m)
- Draught: 9 ft 10 in (3.00 m) mean
- Propulsion: 3 Yarrow boilers; 2 geared Brown-Curtis steam turbines, 27,000 shp
- Speed: 36 knots (41.4 mph; 66.7 km/h)
- Range: 2,750 nmi (5,090 km) at 15 kn (28 km/h)
- Complement: 90
- Armament: 3 × single QF 4 in (102 mm) Mark IV guns; 1 × single 2-pdr 40 mm (2 in) Mk. II AA gun; 2 × twin 21 in (533 mm) torpedo tubes; 4 × depth charge chutes

HMS Seraph was an S-class destroyer, which served with the Royal Navy during the Russian Civil War. The S class were a development of the previous R class, with minor differences, constructed at the end of the First World War. Seraph had a career as an evacuation vessel more than as a warship. Launched in 1918 by Denny, Seraph was originally destined for the Grand Fleet but, after the Armistice, the destroyer transferred to the Mediterranean Fleet based at Malta. The destroyer was sent into the Black Sea to support the White Russian forces in their fight against the Communists. The role involved supporting the movement of troops rather than firing at the enemy. Ultimately, the Communists won and Seraph helped the evacuation of White Russian troops from Crimea, returning to Malta in 1921. The destroyer was then stationed in the Eastern Mediterranean in 1923 in response to the tensions in Turkey. In 1927, the ship was sent to Hong Kong to serve under the Commander-in-Chief, China. In 1929, the vessel was once again called to evacuate, this time Christian missionaries from the Chinese Red Army. Once again, the evacuation took place without bloodshed. With the introduction of more modern destroyers, the Royal Navy started retiring the S class and, in 1934, Seraph was sold to be broken up.

== Design and development ==
Seraph was one of thirty-three Admiralty S class destroyers ordered by the British Admiralty on 7 April 1917 as part of the Eleventh War Construction Programme. The design was a development of the R class introduced as a cheaper and faster alternative to the V and W class. Differences with the R class were minor, such as having the searchlight moved aft.

Seraph had an overall length of 276 ft (84 m) and a length of 265 ft (81 m) between perpendiculars. Beam was 26 ft 8 in (8.13 m) and draught 9 ft 10 in (3.00 m). Displacement was 1,075 long tons (1,092 t) normal and 1,221 long tons (1,241 t) deep load. Three Yarrow boilers fed steam to two sets of Brown-Curtis geared steam turbines rated at 27,000 shaft horsepower (20,000 kW) and driving two shafts, giving a design speed of 36 knots (67 km/h; 41 mph) at normal loading and 32.5 knots (60.2 km/h; 37.4 mph) at deep load. Two funnels were fitted. A full load of 301 long tons (306 t) of fuel oil was carried, which gave a design range of 2,750 nautical miles (5,090 km; 3,160 mi) at 15 knots (28 km/h; 17 mph).

Armament consisted of three QF 4 in (102 mm) Mk IV guns on the ship's centreline. One was mounted raised on the forecastle, one on a platform between the funnels and one aft. The ship also mounted a single 2-pounder 40 mm (1.6 in) "pom-pom" anti-aircraft gun for air defence. Four 21 in (533 mm) torpedo tubes were carried in two twin rotating mounts aft. Four depth charge chutes were also fitted aft. Typically ten depth charges were carried. The ship was designed to mount two additional 18 in (457 mm) torpedo tubes either side of the superstructure but this required the forecastle plating to be cut away, making the vessel very wet, so they were removed. The weight saved enabled the heavier Mark V 21-inch torpedo to be carried. Fire control included a training-only director, single Dumaresq and a Vickers range clock. The ship had a complement of 90 officers and ratings.

== Construction and career ==
Laid down on 10 October 1917 by William Denny and Brothers in Dumbarton with the yard number 1099, Seraph was launched on 8 July the following year. The vessel was the first with the name to serve in the Royal Navy, and the second of six of the class to be built by the yard. Seraph was completed on 25 December shortly after the Armistice that ended the First World War. The vessel was destined to join the Fourteenth Destroyer Flotilla of the Grand Fleet. However, with the dissolution of the Grand Fleet as the Royal Navy adjusted to peacetime operations, Seraph joined the Sixth Destroyer Flotilla of the Mediterranean Fleet and was transferred to Malta.

Increasing awareness of the conflicts in the region, both the Greco-Turkish War and the Russian Civil War, meant that the Royal Navy transferred a number of warships into the Black Sea to assist the evacuation efforts. Seraph was sent to Crimea to support the White Russian forces, arriving in the Sea of Azov with sister ship Speedy in time to support their attack on Mariupol. On 29 June 1919, Seraph assisted the Russian cruiser Kagul in the landing 300 Russian troops that captured Koktebel. The destroyer was then posted to Feodosia arriving on 4 July. Three days later, Seraph was sent to Constantinople to support the peaceful dissolution of the Ottoman Empire.

As it became increasingly clear that the White Russians had lost the war, the ship was also involved in the evacuation of the Crimea. The vessel carried over typically 300 troops at a time, helping to rescue 5,500 people in one night, on 26 March 1920, and was involved in the evacuation of Sevastopol on 11 November. The destroyer returned to Malta on 9 February 1921. However, increasing tension between the new Greek and Turkish states meant the navy built up forces in the Eastern Mediterranean. Seraph was sent to Chanak along with three other destroyers under the flotilla leader Montrose. Returning to Malta on 3 May 1923 for a respite, the destroyer returned to the area 21 days later. With the signing of the Treaty of Lausanne on 24 July, the Mediterranean Fleet was able to be reduced and the destroyers returned to UK waters. On 4 December, Seraph was placed in the Reserve Fleet at Devonport.

On 7 January 1927, the destroyer was recommissioned with a full complement and left on 8 February to join the Eighth Destroyer Flotilla, operating under the Commander-in-Chief, China. By 4 June, the destroyer had joined a multinational force, with warships from the Japanese and US Navies, based in Nanking, in the aftermath of the Nanking incident. On 1 October 1929, the vessel was recommissioned, having arrived in Hong Kong. On 26 December, the destroyer was called upon to sail to Shanwei to evacuate Christian missionaries threatened by the advancing Chinese Red Army. Taking the Apostolic vicar, Enrico Valtorta, as an interpreter, Seraph arrived the following day, and set a cutter to negotiate, containing Valtorta and fifty soldiers, under a flag of truce. The negotiations were successful and no shots were fired.

On 22 April 1930, the London Naval Treaty was signed, which limited total destroyer tonnage in the Royal Navy. The force was looking to introduce more modern destroyers and so needed to retire some of the older vessels. Seraph was retired and, on 7 May 1934, sold to Thos. W. Ward to be broken up at Pembroke Dock.

== Pennant numbers ==
Penant numbers
Pennant number	Date
G60	November 1918
F25	January 1919
D04	1923
