= HMS Tourmaline (1919) =

British S-class destroyer

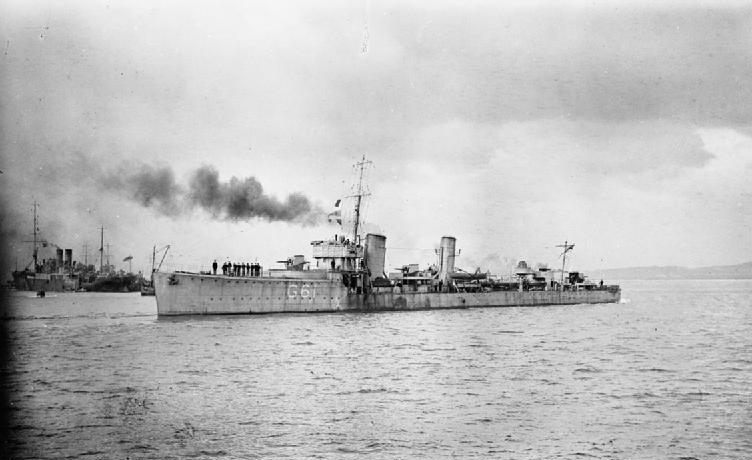
- Sister ship HMS Tobago

History

United Kingdom
- Name: HMS Tourmaline
- Namesake: Tourmaline
- Ordered: June 1917
- Builder: Thornycroft, Woolston
- Laid down: January 1918
- Launched: 19 April 1919
- Completed: 18 December 1919
- Out of service: 28 November 1931
- Fate: Broken up

General characteristics
- Class & type: S-class destroyer
- Displacement: 1,087 long tons (1,104 t) standard; 1,240 long tons (1,260 t) deep load
- Length: 266 ft 9 in (81.3 m) between perpendiculars
- Beam: 27 ft 4 in (8.3 m)
- Draught: 10 ft 4 in (3.15 m)
- Propulsion: 3 Yarrow boilers; 2 geared Brown Curtis steam turbines, 29,000 shp
- Speed: 36 knots (41 mph; 67 km/h)
- Range: 3,450 nautical miles (6,390 km) at 20 knots (37 km/h)
- Complement: 90
- Armament: 3 × QF 4 in (102 mm) Mark IV guns; 1 × single 2-pounder (40 mm) "pom-pom" Mk. II anti-aircraft gun; 6 × 21 in (533 mm) torpedo tubes (2×3); 2 × 21 in (533 mm) torpedo tubes (1×2)

HMS Tourmaline was a Thornycroft S-class destroyer, which served with the Royal Navy during the Greco-Turkish War and the Russian Civil War. Tourmaline was one of three destroyers ordered from Thornycroft in June 1917 with more powerful geared turbines than the majority of the class as well as design changes that improved seakeeping. Launched on 19 April 1919, the vessel operated as part of the Fourth Destroyer Flotilla serving with the Atlantic and Mediterranean Fleets. After serving in the Black Sea and Sea of Marmara, during which sister ships Speedy and Tobago were lost, Tourmaline led the Gibraltar Local Defence Flotilla. The London Naval Treaty, signed 1930, required the retirement of some destroyers to meet the Royal Navy's tonnage requirement and Tourmaline was chosen for retirement. The destroyer was decommissioned on 28 November 1931 after 12 years of service and broken up.

== Design ==
Tourmaline was one of three S-class destroyers ordered by the British Admiralty from Thornycroft in June 1917 as part of the Twelfth War Construction Programme. The design was based on the R-class destroyer Rosalind built by the shipyard. Compared to the standard S-class vessels, the design, also known as Modified Rosalind, was longer, with a raised forward gun position and 18 in (457 mm) torpedo tubes moved to a new position, both of which improved seakeeping. They also had provision for triple torpedo tubes. In a similar way to previous designs, Thornycroft also installed more powerful machinery to give the warship a higher top speed. This also enabled a more stable hull design with a greater beam and a metacentric height of 2 ft 10 in (0.86 m).

Tourmaline had a overall length of 275 ft 9 in (84.05 m) and a length of 266 ft 9 in (81.31 m) between perpendiculars. Beam was 27 ft 4 in (8.33 m) and draught 10 ft 4 in (3.15 m). Displacement was 1,087 long tons (1,104 t) normal and 1,240 long tons (1,260 t) full load. Three Yarrow boilers fed steam to two sets of Brown-Curtis geared steam turbines rated at 29,000 shaft horsepower (22,000 kW) and driving two shafts, giving a design speed of 36 knots (67 km/h; 41 mph) in light load and 32 knots (59 km/h; 37 mph) at full load. Two funnels were fitted, the forward one larger in diameter. A total of 250 long tons (250 t) of fuel oil was carried, giving a design range of 3,450 nautical miles (6,390 km; 3,970 mi) at 20 knots (37 km/h; 23 mph).

Armament consisted of three QF 4-inch (102 mm) Mk IV guns on the ship's centreline. One was mounted raised on the forecastle, one between the funnels and one aft. The ship also mounted a single 2-pounder (40 mm) pom-pom anti-aircraft gun for air defence. A total of eight torpedoes were fitted, consisting of six 21-inch (533 mm) torpedo tubes in two triple rotating mounts aft and two 18 in (460 mm) tubes on fixed mounts fitted athwartships. Complement was 90 officers and ratings.

== Service ==
Laid down in January 1918 at Thornycroft's yard in Woolston, Southampton, Tourmaline was launched on 19 April 1919. On completion on 18 December that year, the ship joined the Fourth Destroyer Flotilla of the Atlantic Fleet under the C-class light cruiser Castor. As part of fleet led by the dreadnought battleship Iron Duke, the ship was assigned to Constantinople as part of a wider presence to represent British interests in the conflicts in the Black Sea. The fleet was soon in action in support of the Volunteer Army fighting in the Southern Front of the Russian Civil War. For the destroyers, this often involved operations close to the coast in areas were the risks were highest. For example, while Tourmaline and sister ship Tobago patrolled the area of the Black Sea between Novorossiysk and Tuapse between 1 and 10 November 1920, Tobago was fatally crippled after striking a mine.

Soon afterwards, Tourmaline was also damaged. After a period back in UK waters, when departing Portland on 17 January 1921 to rejoin the Fleet, the ship collided with the Yarrow-built S-class destroyer Turquoise and had to instead sail to Portsmouth for repairs. Soon afterwards, the Flotilla was allocated to the Mediterranean Fleet. The destroyer formed part of a fleet part of the Royal Navy's presence in the Greco-Turkish War. The ship was allocated to Constantinople and patrolled the areas around the Sea of Marmara While on this service, the ship took on the survivors from sister ship Speedy when that vessel sank on 24 September 1922 with the loss of ten lives. In September 1923, it was announced that Tourmaline and sister-ship Splendid, part of the 8th Destroyer Flotilla, would be transferred to the Local Defence Flotilla at Gibraltar, replacing the R-class destroyers Romola and Rigorous. On 15 May 1926, Tourmaline was recommissioned in Gibraltar to lead the Local Defence Flotilla. On 22 April 1930, the London Naval Treaty was signed, which limited total destroyer tonnage in the Navy. Tourmaline was one of those chosen to be retired and, on 28 November 1931, the destroyer was sold to Thos. W. Ward and broken up at Grays.

== Pennant numbers ==
Pennant number	Date
D83	December 1919
D10	January 1919
H00	November 1919
