= HMS Sepoy (1918) =

Royal Navy S class destroyer

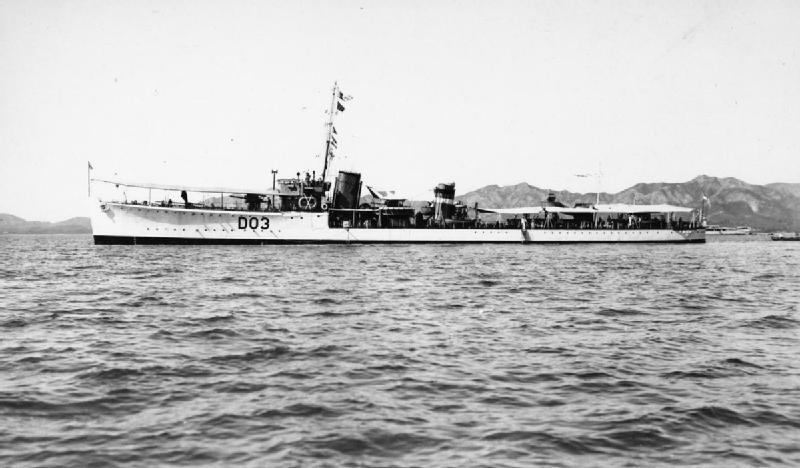
- Sepoy while serving in Asia c. 1930

History

United Kingdom
- Name: Sepoy
- Namesake: Sepoy
- Ordered: 7 April 1917
- Builder: Denny, Dumbarton
- Yard number: 1099
- Laid down: 6 August 1917
- Launched: 22 May 1918
- Completed: 6 August 1918
- Fate: Sold 2 July 1932 to be broken up

General characteristics
- Class & type: S-class destroyer
- Displacement: 1,075 long tons (1,092 t) normal; 1,221 long tons (1,241 t) deep load
- Length: 265 ft (80.8 m) p.p.
- Beam: 26 ft 8 in (8.13 m)
- Draught: 9 ft 10 in (3.00 m) mean
- Propulsion: 3 Yarrow boilers; 2 geared Brown-Curtis steam turbines, 27,000 shp
- Speed: 36 knots (41.4 mph; 66.7 km/h)
- Range: 2,750 nmi (5,090 km) at 15 kn (28 km/h)
- Complement: 90
- Armament: 3 × single QF 4-inch (101.6 mm) Mark IV guns; 1 × single 2-pounder (40-mm) "pom-pom" Mk. II AA gun; 2 × twin 21 in (533 mm) torpedo tubes; 4 × depth charge chutes.

HMS Sepoy was an S-class destroyer, which served with the Royal Navy during the First World War and the Russian Civil War. Sepoy was launched in 1918 and initially joined the Grand Fleet. After the Armistice that ended the First World War, the ship was briefly transferred to the Reserve Fleet before sailing to Tallinn in 1919 as part of the Royal Navy response to the fighting there. Sepoy rejoined the Reserve Fleet at the end of the year. In 1922, the destroyer served in the Mediterranean Sea. The ship was later allocated to the naval base in Hong Kong, arriving in 1929. During exercises the following year, a depth charge explosion killed six sailors. The destroyer was also damaged. Following the signing of the London Naval Treaty a few days later, Sepoy returned to the United Kingdom and, in 1932, was sold to be broken up at Newport, Wales.

== Design and development ==
Sepoy was one of twenty-four Admiralty S class destroyers ordered by the British Admiralty on 7 April 1917 as part of the Eleventh War Construction Programme. The design was a development of the R class introduced as a cheaper and faster alternative to the V and W class. Differences with the R class were minor, such as having the searchlight moved aft.

Sepoy had a overall length of 276 ft (84 m) and a length of 265 ft (81 m) between perpendiculars. Beam was 26 ft 8 in (8.13 m) and draught 9 ft 10 in (3.00 m). Displacement was 1,075 long tons (1,092 t) normal and 1,221 long tons (1,241 t) deep load. Three Yarrow boilers fed steam to two sets of Brown-Curtis geared steam turbines rated at 27,000 shaft horsepower (20,000 kW) and driving two shafts, giving a design speed of 36 knots (67 km/h; 41 mph) at normal loading and 32.5 knots (60.2 km/h; 37.4 mph) at deep load. Two funnels were fitted. A full load of 301 long tons (306 t) of fuel oil was carried, which gave a design range of 2,750 nautical miles (5,090 km; 3,160 mi) at 15 knots (28 km/h; 17 mph). The ship had a complement of 90 officers and ratings.

Armament consisted of three QF 4-inch (102 mm) Mk IV guns on the ship's centreline. One was mounted raised on the forecastle, one on a platform between the funnels and one aft. The ship also mounted a single 40-millimetre (1.6 in) 2-pounder "pom-pom" anti-aircraft gun for air defence. Four 21-inch (533 mm) torpedo tubes were fitted in two twin rotating mounts aft. The ship was designed to mount two additional 18-inch (457 mm) torpedo tubes either side of the superstructure but this required the forecastle plating to be cut away, making the vessel very wet, so they were removed. The weight saved enabled the heavier Mark V 21-inch torpedo to be carried. Four depth charge chutes were also fitted aft and typically ten depth charges were carried. Fire control included a training-only director, single Dumaresq and a Vickers range clock.

== Construction and career ==
Laid down on 6 August 1917 by William Denny and Brothers in Dumbarton with the yard number 1099, Sepoy was launched on 22 May the following year. The vessel was the second with the name, given in honour of the Indian infantry, to serve in the Royal Navy. Sepoy was completed on 6 August and joined the Twelfth Destroyer Flotilla of the Grand Fleet. After the Armistice that ended the First World War, Sepoy was transferred to the Reserve Fleet at Rosyth. However, the escalating civil war in Russia meant that the destroyer was soon back in service. The United Kingdom felt that the Russians were planning to liberate the Baltic States by integrating them into the new Soviet Union.

Sepoy formed part of a flotilla under the command of Rear Admiral Sir Walter Cowan, who had returned to Copenhagen with fresh crews after 19 February 1919. Cowan took Sepoy, along with sister ship Seafire and light cruiser Caledon, first, to Tallinn, and then to Libau. News was received at Libau on 25 April that the Red Fleet, ships of the nascent Soviet Navy, had put to sea, and Sepoy sailed with Caledon, acting as flagship, and Seafire, "within the hour's notice at which the British ships normally kept steam. And as they headed north at high speed, the flagship's wireless sent out an urgent call for the Cleopatra and the destroyers which had recently been detached to Copenhagen, to join their Admiral with all dispatch." Sepoy remained in theatre for some time, until Curacoa struck a mine on 14 May whilst operating in the Baltic. The damaged ship was escorted back to England by Seafire and Sepoy, arriving there on 21 May.

On 3 December, Sepoy was recommissioned in the Reserve Fleet at Chatham, joining the Sixth Destroyer Flotilla of the Mediterranean Fleet. In May 1920, Sepoy was on station at İzmit on the Sea of Marmara, as the Turkish War of Independence continued. On 2 December 1922, the destroyer was based in Gibraltar but 10 days later departed Malta for Constantinople with sister ship Tourmaline in response to the Chanak crisis. The vessel returned to Gibraltar on 23 February.

On 7 January 1927, Sepoy was recommissioned at the Nore to join the Eighth Destroyer Flotilla at the Royal Naval base Tamar at Hong Kong. The vessel arrived on 1 October 1929. On 8 April the following year, the destroyer departed for exercises but, on the following day, one of the depth charges carried aft exploded. Three sailors died instantly and another two were lost overboard. The destroyer was damaged but returned to port without needing assistance. Another sailor later died in hospital. Thirteen days later, the London Naval Treaty was signed, which limited total destroyer tonnage in the Royal Navy. The Admiralty was looking to introduce more modern destroyers and so needed to scrap some of the older vessels. Sepoy was one of those chosen for retirement. The ship returned to the United Kingdom and, on 2 July 1932, was sold to Cashmore to be broken up at Newport, Wales.

== Pennant numbers ==
Penant numbers
Pennant number	Date
G26	September 1918
F49	December 1919
D03	1923
