= HMS Speedy (1918) =

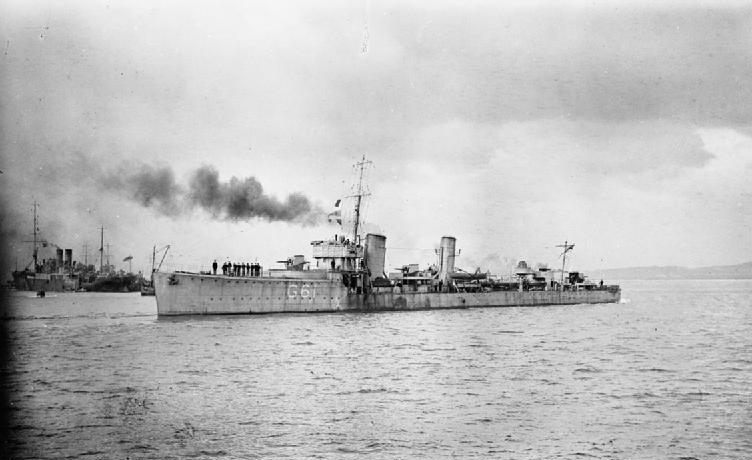
- Sistership HMS Tobago in 1918

History

United Kingdom
- Name: HMS Speedy
- Ordered: April 1917
- Builder: Thornycroft
- Laid down: May 1917
- Launched: 1 June 1918
- Commissioned: 14 August 1918
- Out of service: 24 September 1922
- Fate: Sunk following collision in the Sea of Marmara

General characteristics
- Class & type: S-class destroyer
- Displacement: 1,087 long tons (1,104 t) standard 1,240 long tons (1,260 t) deep load
- Length: 266 ft 9 in (81.3 m) between perpendiculars
- Beam: 27 ft 4 in (8.3 m)
- Draught: 10 ft 4 in (3.15 m)
- Propulsion: 3 Yarrow boilers; 2 geared Brown Curtis steam turbines, 29,000 shp
- Speed: 36 knots (41 mph; 67 km/h)
- Range: 3,450 nautical miles (6,390 km) at 20 knots (37 km/h)
- Complement: 90
- Armament: 3 × QF 4 inches (102 mm) Mark IV guns; 1 × single 2-pounder (40 mm) "pom-pom" Mk. II anti-aircraft gun; 6 × 21 in (533 mm) torpedo tubes (2×3); 2 × 21 in (533 mm) torpedo tubes (2×1)

HMS Speedy was a Thornycroft S-class destroyer which served with the Royal Navy during the First World War, Russian Civil War and the Greco-Turkish War. Speedy was one of a pair of destroyers ordered from Thornycroft with more powerful geared turbines and design changes like a raised forecastle that improved seakeeping. Launched on 1 June 1918, the vessel operated as part of the 12th Destroyer Flotilla of the Grand Fleet for the last months the War. After the Armistice, the vessel joined the Mediterranean Fleet and took part in actions in the Black Sea and Sea of Marmara. It was during action there that the ship struck a tug on 24 September 1922. The collision sank the destroyer, killing ten sailors.

== Design and development ==
Speedy was one of two S-class destroyers ordered by the British Admiralty from Thornycroft in April 1917 as part of the Eleventh War Construction Programme alongside the similar Tobago. The design was based on the R-class destroyer Rosalind built by the shipyard. Compared to the standard S-class vessels, the design, also known as Modified Rosalind, was longer, with a raised forward gun position and 18 in (457 mm) torpedo tubes moved to a new position, both of which improved seakeeping. They also had provision for triple mounts for the main torpedo tubes. In a similar way to previous designs, Thornycroft also installed more powerful machinery to give the warship a higher top speed. This also enabled a more stable hull design with a greater beam and a metacentric height of 2 ft 10 in (0.86 m).

Speedy had a long overall of 275 ft 9 in (84.05 m) between and a length of 266 ft 9 in (81.31 m) between perpendiculars. Beam was 27 ft 4 in (8.33 m) and draught 10 ft 4 in (3.15 m). Displacement was 1,087 long tons (1,104 t) normal and 1,240 long tons (1,260 t) full load. Three Yarrow boilers fed steam to two sets of Brown-Curtis geared steam turbines rated at 29,000 shaft horsepower (22,000 kW) and driving two shafts, giving a design speed of 36 knots (67 km/h; 41 mph) in light load and 32 knots (59 km/h; 37 mph) at full load. Two funnels were fitted, the forward one larger in diameter. The ship carried 250 long tons (250 t) of fuel oil, giving a design range of 3,450 nautical miles (6,390 km; 3,970 mi) at 20 knots (37 km/h; 23 mph).

Armament consisted of three QF 4in Mk IV guns on the ship's centreline. One was mounted raised on the forecastle, one between the funnels and one aft. The ship also mounted a single 2-pounder (40 mm) pom-pom anti-aircraft gun for air defence. Four 21 in (533 mm) torpedoes were fitted in two triple rotating mounts aft with two 18 in (457 mm) fitted athwartships. The ship's complement was 90 officers and ratings.

== Construction and career ==
Laid down in May 1917, Speedy was launched on 1 June 1918 and completed on 14 August that year. For the remainder of the War, the destroyer served in the 12th Destroyer Flotilla. Like many of the class the destroyer was moved to reserve at the end of the conflict.

Speedy was recommissioned on 22 February 1919 and assigned to the Mediterranean Fleet under Blenheim. As part of fleet led by Iron Duke, the ship was assigned to Constantinople to enforce British interests in the conflicts in the Black Sea. To this end, the ship was sent to support the Volunteer Army fighting in the Southern Front of the Russian Civil War, including providing gunfire support during the attack on Mariupol. Speedy was also involved in the evacuation of the High Commission for Southern Russia.

The destroyer also formed part of a fleet that supported Greek forces during the Greco-Turkish War. The action required the ships to avoid casualties as much as possible, which meant that, for example, in the Gulf of Gemlik in July 1920, Speedy had to carefully provide support without firing on Turkish villages. Later, while serving during the Chanak Crisis on 24 September 1922, the destroyer collided with a Turkish tug in the Sea of Marmara near the Gulf. The damage was fatal and the ship sank taking ten crew. The survivors joined the slightly newer Thornycroft-built S-class destroyer Tourmaline under Lt. Cdr. Donal S. McGrath which was also serving in the area.

== Pennant numbers ==
Pennant number	Date
G36	September 1918
F27	January 1919
