= HMS Tobago (1918) =

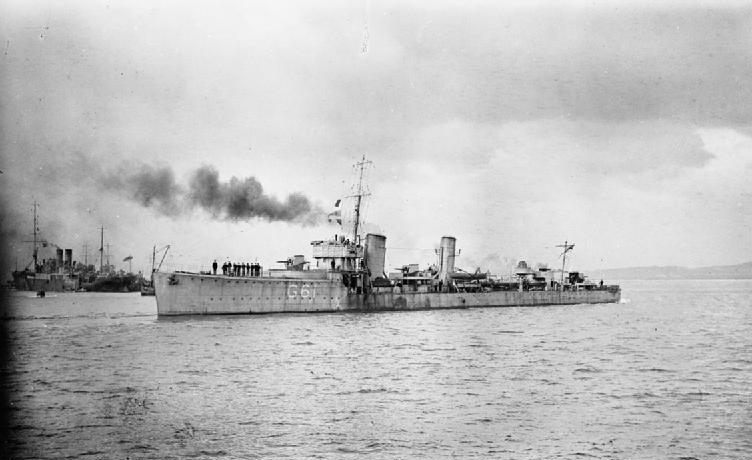
- HMS Tobago in 1918

History

United Kingdom
- Name: HMS Tobago
- Ordered: April 1917
- Builder: Thornycroft
- Laid down: May 1917
- Launched: 15 July 1918
- Commissioned: October 1918
- Decommissioned: 15 December 1920
- Fate: Sold for scrap in Malta on 9 February 1922

General characteristics
- Class & type: S-class destroyer
- Displacement: 1,087 long tons (1,104 t) standard 1,240 long tons (1,260 t) deep load
- Length: 266 ft 9 in (81.3 m) between perpendiculars
- Beam: 27 ft 4 in (8.3 m)
- Draught: 10 ft 6 in (3.20 m)
- Propulsion: 3 Yarrow boilers; 2 geared Brown Curtis steam turbines, 29,000 shp
- Speed: 36 knots (41 mph; 67 km/h)
- Range: 3,450 nautical miles (6,390 km) at 20 knots (37 km/h)
- Complement: 90
- Armament: 3 × QF 4 inches (102 mm) Mark IV guns; 1 × single 2-pounder (40 mm) "pom-pom" Mk. II anti-aircraft gun; 6 × 21 in (533 mm) torpedo tubes (2×3); 2 × 18 in (457 mm) torpedo tubes (2×1)

HMS Tobago was a Thornycroft S-class destroyer which served with the Royal Navy during the Greco-Turkish War. Launched by Thornycroft on 15 July 1918, the vessel followed a design typical of the yard by being faster than the majority of the class, and also had better seakeeping properties thanks to a raised forecastle. The destroyer operated as part of the Grand Fleet for the last few weeks of the First World War, and, after the Armistice, joined the Mediterranean Fleet based in Malta. While serving in off the coast of Turkey, the ship hit a mine on 15 July 1920, exactly two years after being launched. Despite the relative youth of the vessel, the damage was deemed irrepairable and so Tobago returned to Malta and was sold for scrap on 9 February 1922.

== Design and development ==
Tobago was one of two S-class destroyers ordered by the British Admiralty from Thornycroft in April 1917 as part of the Eleventh War Construction Programme alongside Speedy. The design was based on the R-class destroyer Rosalind built by the shipyard. Compared to the standard S-class vessels, the design, also known as Modified Rosalind, was longer, with a raised forward gun position and 18 in (457 mm) torpedo tubes moved to a new position, both of which improved seakeeping. They also had provision for triple mounts for the main torpedo tubes. In a similar way to previous designs, Thornycroft also installed more powerful machinery to give the warship a higher top speed. This also enabled a more stable hull design with a greater beam and a metacentric height of 2 ft 10 in (0.86 m).

With an overall length of 275 ft 9 in (84.05 m) and a length of 266 ft 9 in (81.31 m) between perpendiculars, Tobago had a beam of 27 ft 4 in (8.33 m) and a draught of 10 ft 6 in (3.20 m). Displacement was 1,087 long tons (1,104 t) normal and 1,240 long tons (1,260 t) full load. Three Yarrow boilers fed steam to two sets of Brown-Curtis geared steam turbines rated at 29,000 shaft horsepower (22,000 kW) and driving two shafts, giving a design speed of 36 knots (67 km/h; 41 mph) in light load and 32 knots (59 km/h; 37 mph) at full load. Two funnels were fitted, the forward one larger in diameter. A total of 250 long tons (250 t) of fuel oil were carried, giving a design range of 3,450 nautical miles (6,390 km; 3,970 mi) at 20 knots (37 km/h; 23 mph).

Tobago's armament consisted of three QF 4in Mk IV guns on the ship's centreline. One was mounted on the raised forecastle, while another was positioned between the second and third funnels and the last was located aft. The ship also mounted a single 2-pounder (40 mm) pom-pom anti-aircraft gun for air defence. Six 21 in (533 mm) torpedoes were launched from two triple rotating mounts located aft with two 18 in (457 mm) mounts fitted athwartships. This ship's complement was 90 officers and ratings.

== Construction and career ==
Laid down in May 1917, Tobago was launched on 15 July 1918 and completed on 2 October that year. The destroyer joined the Fourteenth Destroyer Flotilla just before the end of the First World War. After the Armistice, the Grand Fleet was dissolved. Tobago was recommissioned on 22 February 1919 and assigned to the Mediterranean Fleet attached to the depot ship Blenheim. The ship was assigned to Malta to support of British interests in the Greco-Turkish War. While on patrol on 15 July 1920, Tobago hit a mine 10 miles (16 km) off the coast from Trabzon. The damage was deemed uneconomic to repair and, on 15 December 1920, the ship was paid off. The destroyer returned to Malta and was sold for scrap on 9 February 1922.

== Pennant numbers ==
| Pennant number | Date |
|---|---|
| G61 | September 1918 |
| F28 | January 1919 |
| HA8 | January 1922 |
