= HMS Rosalind (1916) =

Destroyer of the Royal Navy

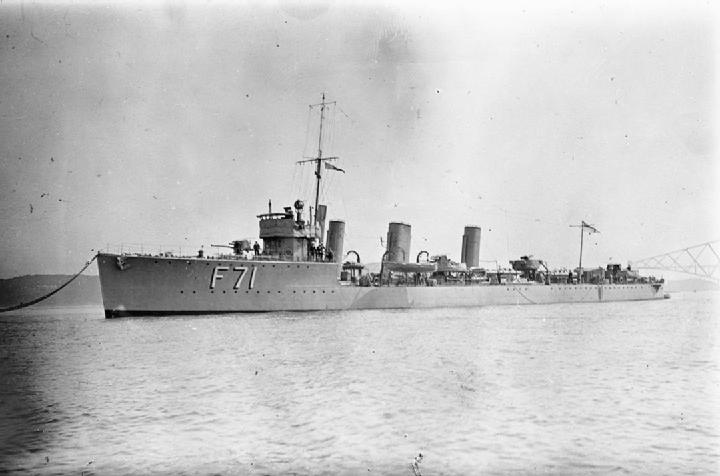
- Sister ship HMS Taurus

History

United Kingdom
- Name: Rosalind
- Ordered: July 1915
- Builder: Thornycroft, Woolston, Southampton
- Yard number: 850
- Laid down: October 1915
- Launched: 14 October 1916
- Commissioned: December 1916
- Decommissioned: 13 July 1926
- Fate: Broken up at Garston, Liverpool

General characteristics
- Class & type: R-class destroyer
- Displacement: 1,037 long tons (1,054 t) standard 1,208 long tons (1,227 t) full
- Length: 274 ft (83.5 m)
- Beam: 27 ft 6 in (8.4 m)
- Draught: 11 ft (3.4 m)
- Installed power: 3 Yarrow boilers, 29,000 shp (22,000 kW)
- Propulsion: Brown-Curtis geared steam turbines, 2 shafts
- Speed: 35 kn (40 mph; 65 km/h)
- Range: 3,450 nmi (6,390 km) at 20 kn (37 km/h)
- Complement: 82
- Armament: 3 × QF 4 inches (102 mm) Mark IV guns, mounting P Mk. IX; 1 × single 2-pounder (40 mm) "pom-pom" Mk. II anti-aircraft gun; 4 × 21 in (533 mm) torpedo tubes (2×2)

HMS Rosalind was an R-class destroyer which served with the Royal Navy. The ship was launched by Thornycroft in October 1916 as the first of five similar ships ordered from the yard. The design was used as the basis for five subsequent ships of the S-class also built by the company. Rosalind served as part of the Grand Fleet during the First World War, operating as an escort to other warships and in anti-submarine patrols alongside other destroyers of the coast of Scotland and Ireland. In 1917, the destroyer escorted the armoured cruisers Duke of Edinburgh and HMS Shannon. After the Armistice that ended the wr, Rosalind was briefly paid off, then recommissioned and served with the Portsmouth local defence flotilla. In 1924, the destroyer participated in a naval review in front of George V. The vessel was sold to be broken up in July 1926.

== Design and development ==
As the First World War progressed, the Royal Navy required more, and more modern, warships. Rosalind was the first of three R-class destroyers ordered by the British Admiralty from John I. Thornycroft & Company in July 1915 as part of the Sixth War Construction Programme. The destroyers were known as the 'Rosalind group', named after this vessel. The ships differed from the six preceding Thornycroft M-class built by the yard in having all geared steam turbines and the aft gun being raised on a bandstand.

Rosalind had a long overall of 274 feet (84 m), with a beam of 27 feet 6 inches (8.38 m) and a draught of 11 feet (3.4 m). Displacement was 1,037 long tons (1,054 t) normal and 1,208 long tons (1,227 t) full load. Three Yarrow boilers fed steam to two sets of Brown-Curtis geared steam turbines rated at 29,000 shp (22,000 kW) and driving two shafts, giving a design speed of 35 knots (65 km/h; 40 mph), although the ship reached 37.09 knots (68.69 km/h; 42.68 mph) during trials. Three funnels were fitted. A total of 296 long tons (301 t) of fuel oil was carried, giving a design range of 3,450 nautical miles (6,390 km; 3,970 mi) at 20 knots (37 km/h; 23 mph).

Armament consisted of three QF 4in Mk IV guns on the ship's centreline, with one on the forecastle, one aft on a raised bandstand and one between the second and third funnels. A single 2-pounder (40 mm) pom-pom anti-aircraft gun was carried, along with four 21 in (533 mm) torpedoes in two twin rotating mounts. The destroyer was fitted with racks and storage for depth charges. Initially, only two depth charges were carried but the number increased in service and by 1918, the vessel was carrying between 30 and 50 depth charges. The vessel had a complement of 82 officers and ratings.

== Construction and career ==
Rosalind was laid down in October 1915 and launched on 14 October 1916. On commissioning in December 1916, the ship joined the Grand Fleet, initially joining the Thirteenth Destroyer Flotilla. However, within a month, Rosalind had moved and served until the end of the war as part of the Fifteenth Destroyer Flotilla. Between 15 and 24 June 1917, the flotilla took part in anti-submarine patrols east of the Shetland Islands. Rosalind did not sight any submarines, but out of the 117 ships that sailed the route to and from Scandinavia, four were sunk during the operation. On 2 August, the destroyer escorted the armoured cruisers Duke of Edinburgh and HMS Shannon off the coast of Scotland. Rosalind was transferred to form part of the defence of the Irish Coast during December, serving in that capacity into 1918. The destroyer remained a member of the Fifteenth Destroyer Flotilla.

After the Armistice of 11 November 1918 that ended the war, the Royal Navy returned to a peacetime level of strength and both the number of ships and the amount of personnel in service needed to be reduced to save money. Having been paid off earlier in the year, the vessel was re-commissioned on 15 December 1919, with a reduced complement. Rosalind subsequently formed part of the local defence flotilla for Portsmouth under the cruiser Dido. On 26 July 1924, the vessel participated in a naval review in front of George V. However, by that time, the Navy had decided to systematically scrap many of the older destroyers in preparation for the introduction of newer and larger vessels. Rosalind was one of those deemed to have reached the end of life and so was sold to King of Garston, Liverpool, to be broken up on 13 July 1926.

== Legacy ==
Rosalind was the prototype for not only three similar R class destroyers built by Thornycroft, but also the five S-class destroyers built by the same yard, including two that served with the Royal Canadian Navy. These were termed Modified Rosalinds. The name Rosalind was reused by the Shakespearian-class trawler HMT Rosalind that was a founding member of the Royal East African Navy.

== Pennant numbers ==
Pennant number	Date
G95	January 1917
G89	January 1918
D87	January 1919
H77	January 1922
G64	August 1925
