= SMS V26 =

History

German Empire
- Name: SMS V26
- Ordered: 1913
- Builder: AG Vulcan, Stettin
- Launched: 21 February 1914
- Commissioned: 27 August 1914
- Fate: Scrapped 1922

General characteristics
- Class & type: V25-class torpedo boat
- Displacement: 975 t (960 long tons)
- Length: 78.5 m (257 ft 7 in)
- Beam: 8.33 m (27 ft 4 in)
- Draft: 3.63 m (11 ft 11 in)
- Installed power: 23,500 PS (23,200 shp; 17,300 kW)
- Propulsion: 3 × water tube boilers; 2 × AEG Vulcan Steam Turbines
- Speed: 33.5 kn (62.0 km/h; 38.6 mph)
- Range: 1,950 nmi (3,610 km; 2,240 mi) at 17 kn (31 km/h; 20 mph)
- Complement: 83 officers and sailors
- Armament: 3 × 8.8 cm (3.5 in) L/45 guns; 6 × 500 mm torpedo tubes; 24 mines

SMS V26 (Note: "SMS" stands for Seiner Majestät Schiff ('His Majesty's Ship')) (Note: The "V" in V26 denoted the shipbuilder who constructed her.) was a V25-class torpedo boat of the Imperial German Navy that served during the First World War. The ship was built by AG Vulcan at Stettin in Prussia (now Szczecin in Poland), and was completed in June 1914.

The ship served in the Baltic, North Sea and English Channel, taking part in the Battle of Jutland on 31 May–1 June 1916 and the Battle of Dover Strait on 26/27 October that year. She survived the war after which she was surrendered under the Treaty of Versailles and scrapped in 1922.

== Construction and design ==
In 1913, the Imperial German Navy placed orders for 12 high-seas torpedo boats, with six each ordered from AG Vulcan (V25–V30) and Schichau-Werke (S31–S36). (Note: The Imperial German Navy's practice was to split a year's orders into half-flotillas of six torpedo boats from different builders.) While the designs built by each shipyard were broadly similar, they differed from each other in detail, and were significantly larger and more capable than the small torpedo boats built for the German Navy in the last two years.

V26 was laid down as yard number 347 at AG Vulcan's Stettin shipyard, was launched on 21 February 1914 and commissioned on 1 August 1914.

V26 was 78.5 metres (257 ft 7 in) long overall and 77.8 metres (255 ft 3 in) at the waterline, with a beam of 8.33 metres (27 ft 4 in) and a draft of 3.63 metres (11 ft 11 in). Displacement was 812 tonnes (799 long tons) normal and 975 tonnes (960 long tons) deep load. Three oil-fired water-tube boilers fed steam to 2 sets of AEG-Vulcan steam turbines rated at 23,500 metric horsepower (23,200 shp; 17,300 kW), giving a speed of 33.5 knots (62.0 km/h; 38.6 mph). 225 tonnes (221 long tons) of fuel oil was carried, giving a range of 1,080 nautical miles (2,000 km; 1,240 mi) at 20 knots (37 km/h; 23 mph).

Armament consisted of three 8.8 cm SK L/45 naval guns in single mounts, (Note: SK stood for Schnellfeuerkanone (quick-firing gun).) (Note: In Imperial German Navy gun nomenclature, the L/45 denotes the length of the gun. In this case, the L/45 gun is 45 caliber, meaning that the gun is 45 times as long as it is in diameter.) together with six 50 cm (19.7 in) torpedo tubes with two fixed single tubes forward and 2 twin mounts aft. Up to 24 mines could be carried. The ship had a complement of 83 officers and men.

== Service ==
On 1 August 1914, Germany declared war on the Russian Empire, with the newly commissioned V26 was deployed to the Baltic coast-defence division as one of the few modern German torpedo boats in the Baltic. On 9 August, V26 along with sister ship V25 and the torpedo boat V186 accompanied the light cruisers Augsburg and Magdeburg on a sortie into the Baltic. The torpedo boats turned back and returned to Memel on 11 August owing to fuel shortages. V26, V25 and V186 together with Augsburg and Magdeburg took part in another sortie into the Baltic from 15 to 20 August, escorting the minelayer Deutschland on a mission to lay a minefield at the entrance to the Gulf of Finland. The operation was disrupted when they encountered the Russian cruisers Admiral Makarov and Gromoboi, forcing the minefield to be laid out of its planned position. The Russian ships did not attack because they thought that the German force was accompanied by two armoured cruisers. On 26 August, V26 was escorting Magdeburg on a sortie against Russian patrols in the Gulf of Finland when the cruiser ran aground off Osmussaar, Estonia. Attempts by V26 to pull Magdeburg clear failed, and V26 took off part of Magdeburg's crew before the arrival of the Russian cruisers Bogatyr and Pallada arrived, driving off V26. V26 was hit by one 6 inch shell in a stern, which destroyed officers' quarters, inflicting casualties among survivors, and damaged one turbine's steam pipe. Unknown to the Germans, the Russians managed to salvage important German code books from Magdeburg, copies of which were passed to the British for use by Room 40.

In September 1914, V26 and V186 were detached to the North Sea, replaced by six torpedo boats (G132–G136) in the Baltic. In October 1914, V26 was part of the 17th Half Flotilla of the 9th Torpedo Boat Flotilla. As a response to an unsuccessful attack on 18 October by the British submarine E1 on the German cruiser Victoria Louise at the entrance to the Baltic, the newly formed 17th Half-Flotilla, including V26, was diverted from its work-up activities to carry out anti-submarine patrols in the Fehmarn Belt. On 19 October, the 17th Half Flotilla was relieved by the 8th Torpedo Boat Flotilla, and returned to Kiel.

On 15 December 1914 the German battlecruiser squadron under the command of Franz von Hipper set out on an attack on the British east coast towns of Scarborough, Hartlepool, West Hartlepool and Whitby, with the intent of drawing out parts of the British Grand Fleet where it could be defeated in detail. The 9th Torpedo Boat Flotilla, including V26 was part of the escort for Hipper's heavy ships. On 14 January 1915, the cruisers Strassburg and Stralsund, escorted by the 9th Torpedo boat Flotilla, including V26, set out to lay a minefield off the Humber. The weather was extremely poor, with the torpedo-boats struggling in the heavy seas, and after V26 collided with V25 causing minor damage, the torpedo boats turned back, leaving the two cruisers to carry on unescorted. The minefield claimed a British trawler, Windsor, on 22 January.

On 10 February 1916, V26 took part in a sortie by 25 torpedo boats of the 2nd, 6th and 9th Torpedo-boat Flotillas into the North Sea. The sortie led to an encounter between several German torpedo boats and British minesweepers off the Dogger Bank, which resulted in the British minesweeper Arabis being torpedoed and sunk by ships of the 2nd Flotilla. On 24 April 1916, the German battlecruisers of I Scouting Group and the light cruisers of the II Scouting Group set out from Kiel on a mission to bombard the British East-coast towns of Yarmouth and Lowestoft, with the torpedo boats of the 6th and 9th Torpedo Boat Flotillas as escorts, and V26 as part of the 9th Flotilla. The battleships of the High Seas Fleet were deployed in support, with the hope of destroying isolated elements of the British Forces if they tried to intercept. There was a brief engagement between the German forces and the light cruisers and destroyers of the Harwich Force, which caused the German battlecruisers to break off the bombardment of Lowestoft, but rather than take the chance to destroy the outnumbered British force, the Germans chose to retire.

V26 participated in the Battle of Jutland as part of the 17th Half Flotilla of the 9th Flotilla, in support of the German battlecruisers. The 9th Flotilla, including V26, took part in an attempted torpedo attack on British battlecruisers from about 17:26 CET (16:26 GMT). V26 managed to launch a single torpedo at the British battlecruisers (which missed, like all the German torpedoes launched during this attack), but the attack was disrupted by British destroyers of the 13th and the 10th Destroyer Flotillas, which were attempting an attack on the German battlecruisers. The German torpedo boat V27 was disabled by a shell in her engine room during this engagement, while V29 was hit by a torpedo from the British destroyer Petard. V26 collected the crew of V27, before attempting to scuttle the stricken torpedo boat. An attempt to torpedo V27 failed when the torpedo would not run straight, and V26 was forced to sink V27 by gunfire. V26, together with S35, then took off the crew of the sinking V29. From about 20:15 CET (19:15 GMT), V26 took part in a large-scale torpedo attack on the British fleet in order to cover the outnumber German battleship's turn to west. V26 launched three torpedoes, which as with all the torpedoes launched in this attack, missed. While V26 was unharmed in this attack, several torpedo boats were damaged by heavy British fire, (Note: G41, G86, G87, V28, S51 and S52 were all damaged in this attack.) and S35 was sunk. V26 was part of the 9th Torpedo Boat Flotilla during the inconclusive Action of 19 August 1916, when the German High Seas Fleet sailed to cover a sortie of the battlecruisers of the 1st Scouting Group.

In October 1916, the 3rd and 9th Torpedo Boat Flotillas were ordered to reinforce the German naval forces based in Flanders, in order to disrupt the Dover Barrage, a series of anti submarine minefields and nets that attempted to stop U-boats from operating in the English Channel, and to directly attack cross-Channel shipping. The twenty torpedo boats of the two flotillas, including V26, now part of the 18th Half Flotilla of the 9th Flotilla, left Wilhelmshaven on 23 October, reaching Belgium the next day. The 9th Flotilla took part in a large scale raid into the English Channel on the night of 26/27 October 1916, and was assigned the role of attacking Allied shipping while other torpedo boats went after the Dover Barrage, with the 18th Half Flotilla, including V26, to operate off Calais. The 18th Half Flotilla successfully passed through the British defences of the Dover Straits, despite twice encountering British warships on the journey through the barrage. Four British destroyers (Note: Laforey, Liberty, Lucifer and Laurel) on passage to Dunkirk were spotted, but failed to see the German ships, while the old destroyer Flirt spotted the 18th Half Flotilla and challenged them, but the Germans repeated Flirt's signal and continued on course, with Flirt mistaking the ships for the Laforey division and not engaging or reporting the ships. The 18th Half Flotilla did not encounter any of the hoped for merchant ships, but on its return journey clashed with three British destroyers (Note: Viking, Mohawk and Tartar) which attempted to pursue, but lost contact after German fire caused Mohawk's rudder to jam. Other German units sank several drifters that were part of the Dover Barrage together with Flirt (which was attempting to rescue the crews of the drifters) and the merchant ship The Queen, and badly damaged the destroyer Nubian. The 9th Flotilla continued to operate from Flanders, attacking shipping off the coast of the Netherlands on 1 November. On the night of 23/24 November, V26 was one of 13 torpedo boats that took part in an attempt to attack shipping in the Downs. While they clashed briefly with patrolling drifters, they found none of the shipping anchored on the Downs. On the night of 26/27 November, the 9th Flotilla sortied again, stopping the Dutch merchant ship Beijerland and taking her pilot prisoner, and sinking the naval trawler Narval. The torpedo boats V30 and S34 collided during this sortie, badly damaging both ships. The 9th Flotilla (less the two damaged torpedo boats) returned to Germany on 30 November.

V26 collided with the German submarine UB-25 at Kiel on 19 March 1917, sinking UB-25 and killing 16 of the submarine's crew. UB-25 was subsequently salvaged and returned to service as a training submarine. By late April 1917, the torpedo boats of the 9th Torpedo Boat Flotilla had been fitted for minesweeping and their crews trained in that task, and became increasingly dedicated to minesweeping. The 9th Flotilla, together with the 6th Flotilla and the cruisers Emden, Graudenz, Frankfurt and Bremse took part in a commerce-raiding sortie into the Skaggerak and Kattegat on 10–13 March 1918. V26 remained part of the 9th Torpedo Boat Flotilla in November 1918, when the Armistice of 11 November 1918 stopped the fighting between Germany and the Allies.

=== Post-war operations and disposal ===
By the terms of the Armistice, a large proportion of the Imperial German Navy, including 50 modern torpedo boats, was interned at Scapa Flow in the Orkneys. V26 remained in German hands, however, forming part of the Eisernen Flottille (Note: English: Iron Flotilla), a volunteer force of torpedo boats remaining in active service and used for security duties, although the ship's torpedo tubes were removed under the terms of the Armistice. On 21 June 1919, the German fleet interned at Scapa scuttled itself, and as a result, Germany was forced to hand over more warships and equipment, including V26, to the Allies under the Treaty of Versailles to compensate for the ships scuttled at Scapa. The Allies decided to transfer 10 destroyers from the ships surrendered from the German and Austro-Hungarian to each of the French and Italian navies to replace wartime losses. Twenty of the best of the surrendered German torpedo boats, including V26, were therefore sent to Cherbourg in France to allow France and Italy to make their selection. The unwanted ships would be scrapped by Britain. V26 was not wanted, and was sold for scrap on 21 October 1920, and was scrapped at Portishead in 1922.

== Bibliography ==
- Campbell, John (1998). Jutland: An Analysis of the Fighting. London: Conway Maritime Press. ISBN 0-85177-750-3.
- Dodson, Aidan (2019). "Beyond the Kaiser: The IGN's Destroyers and Torpedo Boats After 1918". In Jordan, John (ed.). Warship 2019. Oxford, UK: Osprey Publishing. pp. 129–144. ISBN 978-1-4728-3595-6.
- Firle, Rudolph (1921). Der Krieg in der Ostsee: Erster Band: Von Kriegsbeginn bis Mitte März 1915. Der Krieg zur See: 1914–1918 (in German). Berlin: Verlag von E. S. Mittler und Sohn.
- Fock, Harald (1989). Z-Vor! Internationale Entwicklung und Kriegseinsätze von Zerstörern und Torpedobooten 1914 bis 1939 (in German). Herford, Germany: Koehlers Verlagsgesellschaft mBH. ISBN 3-7822-0207-4.
- Gardiner, Robert; Gray, Randal, eds. (1985). Conway's All The World's Fighting Ships 1906–1921. London: Conway Maritime Press. ISBN 0-85177-245-5.
- Gröner, Erich; Jung, Dieter; Maass, Martin (1983). Die deutschen Kriegsschiffe 1815–1945: Band 2: Torpedoboote, Zerstörer, Schnellboote, Minensuchboote, Minenräumboote (in German). Koblenz: Bernard & Graef Verlag. ISBN 3-7637-4801-6.
- Gröner, Erich; Jung, Dieter; Maass, Martin (1985). Die deutschen Kriegsschiffe 1815–1945: Band 3: U-Boote, Hilfskreuzer, Minenschiffe, Netzleger, Sperrbrecher (in German). Koblenz: Bernard & Graef Verlag. ISBN 3-7637-4802-4.
- Groos, O. (1923). Der Krieg in der Nordsee: Dritter Band: Von Ende November 1914 bis Unfang Februar 1915. Der Krieg zur See: 1914–1918 (in German). Berlin: Verlag von E. S. Mittler und Sohn – via National Library of Estonia.
- Halpern, Paul G. (1994). A Naval History of World War I. London: UCL Press. ISBN 1-85728-498-4.
- Massie, Robert K. (2007). Castles of Steel: Britain, Germany and the Winning of the Great War at Sea. London: Vintage Books. ISBN 978-0-099-52378-9.
- Karau, Mark K. (2014). The Naval Flank of the Western Front: The German MarineKorps Flandern 1914–1918. Barnsley, UK: Seaforth Publishing. ISBN 978-1-84832-231-8.
- Monograph No. 25: The Baltic 1914 (PDF). Naval Staff Monographs (Historical). Vol. VII. The Naval Staff, Training and Staff Duties Division. 1922. pp. 67–103.
- Monograph No. 28: Home Waters—Part III. From November 1914 to the end of January 1915 (PDF). Naval Staff Monographs (Historical). Vol. XII. The Naval Staff, Training and Staff Duties Division. 1925.
- Monograph No. 31: Home Waters Part VI: From October 1915 to May 1916 (PDF). Naval Staff Monographs (Historical). Vol. XV. Naval Staff, Training and Staff Duties Division. 1926.
- Monograph No. 32: Lowestoft Raid: 24th – 25th April, 1916 (PDF). Naval Staff Monographs (Historical). Vol. XVI. The Naval Staff, Training and Staff Duties Division. 1927.
- Monograph No. 33: Home Waters Part VII: From June 1916 to November 1916 (PDF). Naval Staff Monographs (Historical). Vol. XVII. Naval Staff, Training and Staff Duties Division. 1927.
- Newbolt, Henry (1928). History of the Great War: Naval Operations: Volume IV. London: Longmans, Green & Co. OCLC 669033099.
- Ruge, F. (1972). Warship Profile 27: SM Torpedo Boat B110. Profile Publications.
