= HMS Viking (1909) =

Destroyer of the Royal Navy

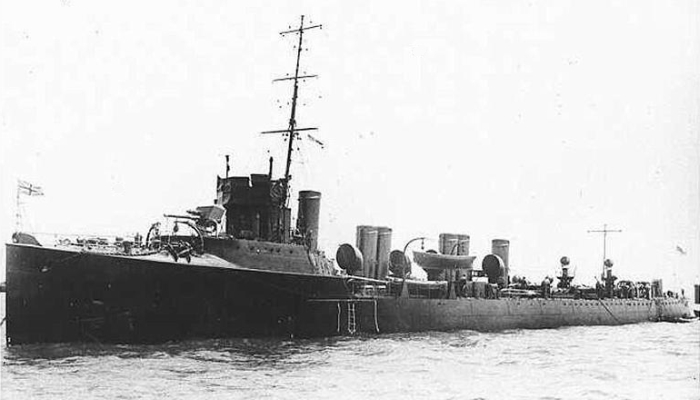
- HMS Viking

History

United Kingdom
- Name: HMS Viking
- Builder: Palmers
- Laid down: 11 June 1908
- Launched: 14 September 1909
- Fate: Sold for scrap 1919

General characteristics
- Class & type: Tribal-class destroyer
- Length: 290 ft 3 in (88.47 m) oa
- Beam: 27 ft 5 in (8.36 m)
- Draught: 9 ft 9 in (2.97 m)
- Propulsion: 6 Yarrow boilers, Steam turbines, 3 shafts; 15,500 shp (11,600 kW)
- Speed: 33 kn (61 km/h; 38 mph)
- Range: 1,725 nmi (3,195 km; 1,985 mi) at 15 kn (28 km/h; 17 mph)
- Complement: 71
- Armament: 2 × 4 in (102 mm) guns, 2 × 18 inch (450 mm) torpedo tubes

HMS Viking was a Tribal-class destroyer of the Royal Navy launched in 1909 and sold for scrap in 1919. She was the only destroyer ever to have six funnels.

== Construction and design ==
HMS Viking was one of five Tribal-class destroyers ordered as part of the Royal Navy's 1907–08 shipbuilding programme. She was laid down at Palmers' Jarrow shipyard on 11 June 1908 and was launched on 14 September 1909. The Tribal-class destroyers were to be powered by steam turbines and use oil-fuel rather than coal, and be capable of 33 knots (61 km/h; 38 mph), but detailed design was left to the builders, which meant that individual ships of the class differed greatly.

Viking was 290 feet 3 inches (88.47 m) long overall and 280 feet 2 3/4 inches (85.41 m) between perpendiculars, with a beam of 27 feet 5 inches (8.36 m) and a draught of 9 feet 9 inches (2.97 m). Normal displacement was 1,090 long tons (1,110 t), with full load displacement 1,210 long tons (1,230 t). She had a turtleback forecastle topped by a raised forward gun platform that also carried the ship's bridge. The raised gun platform acted as a breakwater, causing heavy spray that made it difficult to work the forward gun or use the bridge. Six Yarrow boilers fed steam at 220 pounds per square inch (1,500 kPa) to Parsons steam turbines, giving 15,500 shaft horsepower (11,600 kW) and driving three propeller shafts. The outtakes from the boilers were fed to six funnels, making Viking the Royal Navy's only six-funneled destroyer. Range was 1,725 nautical miles (3,195 km; 1,985 mi) at 15 knots (28 km/h; 17 mph).

Gun armament consisted of two 4 inch guns, (Note: Gardiner and Gray state that the guns were BL Mk IV, while Friedman claims that they were BL Mk VIII guns.) the 12-pounder guns carried by earlier Tribals having been proved ineffective by trials against the old destroyer HMS Skate in 1906. Two 18 inch (450 mm) torpedo tubes were carried. The ship had a complement of 71.

Viking was commissioned in June 1910, having reached a speed of 33.4 knots (61.9 km/h; 38.4 mph) during sea trials.

== Service ==
On commissioning, Viking joined the First Destroyer Flotilla, remaining part of that unit until 1913. In October that year, the Tribals were officially designated the F class, and as such the letter "F" was painted on Afridi's bows.

In February 1914, the Tribals, whose range was too short for effective open sea operations, were sent to Dover, forming the 6th Destroyer Flotilla. On the outbreak of the First World War, the 6th Flotilla formed the basis of the Dover Patrol, with which the Tribal class, including Viking served for the duration of the war.

In October 1914, the Dover Patrol was deployed to help support Belgian ground forces during the Battle of the Yser, carrying out shore bombardment operations. Viking suffered an explosion of its forward gun, wounding two and causing the ship to be withdrawn from the operations. (Viking was later awarded the Battle Honour "Belgian Coast 1914–18").

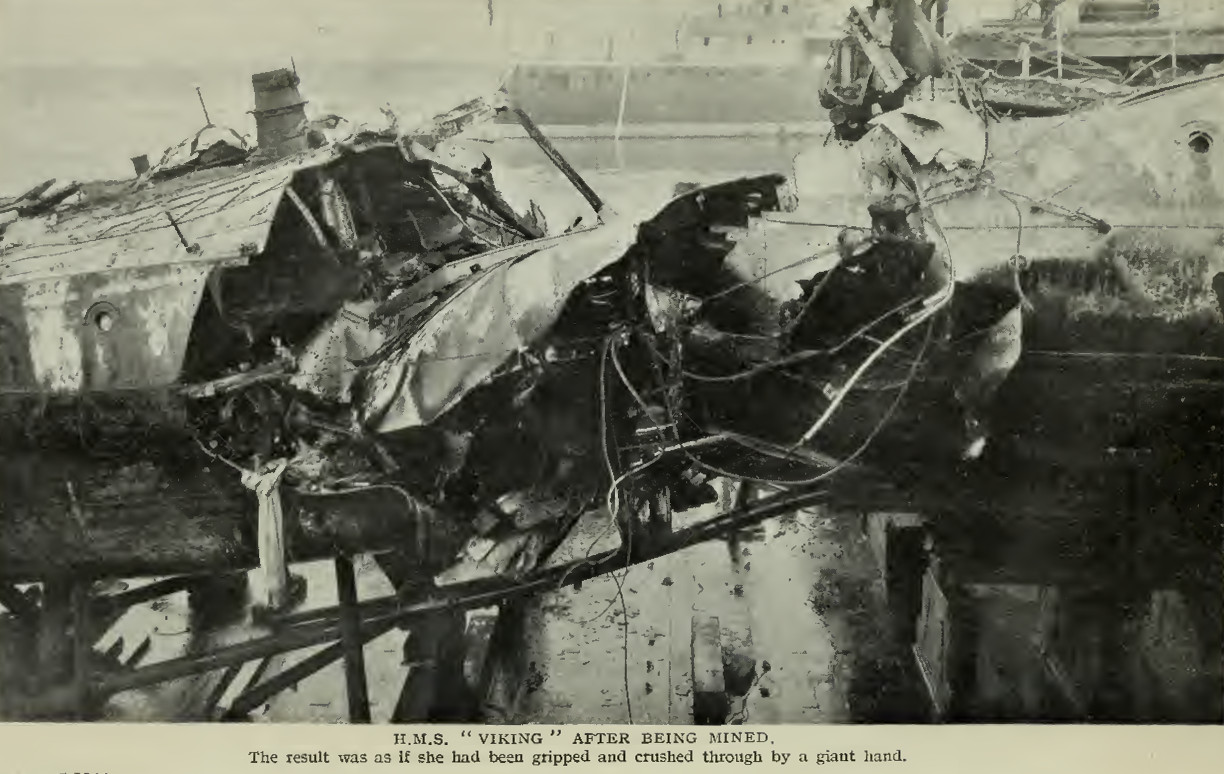
Viking after hitting a mine

On 20 February 1915, Viking was patrolling anti submarine nets in the Dover strait when she saw indicator buoys being disturbed, and in the belief that this was due to a submarine being caught on the nets, called up several destroyers, including sister ship Afridi and drifters to investigate. Although an explosive anti-submarine sweep was fired, no submarine was damaged. (Note: The submarine U-8 was caught in the nets in the strait on this day but managed to escape.) On 4 March 1915, the German submarine U-8 became caught in the Dover straits nets, and the resulting disturbance was spotted by the drifter Roburn, which called up the nearby destroyer patrol, including Viking, Ghurka, Maori and Nubian. Viking fired her explosive sweep with no effect, but after the submarine was spotted by Maori, Ghurka used her own explosive sweep to force the German submarine to the surface. After briefly being shelled, the submarine was scuttled and abandoned, the crew surrendering.

Viking was damaged after hitting a mine near the Colbart Bank on 29 January 1916. Ten of Viking' s crew were killed. (Note: One of those killed was Harold Tennyson, grandson of Alfred, Lord Tennyson.) On the night of 26/27 October 1916, German torpedo boats of their Flanders Flotilla carried out a large scale raid into the English Channel, hoping to attack the drifters watching the anti-submarine nets of the Dover Barrage, and to sink Allied shipping in the Channel. Viking was one of six Tribal-class destroyers waiting at readiness in Dover harbour, and when the Germans attacked the drifters and sank the supporting destroyer HMS Flirt, they were ordered to intervene. The destroyers split up as they left Dover harbour, with Viking leading Mohawk and Tartar from the Western entrance to the port, while the other three destroyers (Nubian, Amazon and Cossack) left by the other entrance and failed to join up with Viking's group. The group led by Viking encountered a group of unknown warships. When Viking challenged the ships (which were in fact the German 18th Half Flotilla), the German ships replied with shellfire that hit Mohawk and caused her steering to jam. This caused Mohawk to block the course of Viking when she attempted to pursue the German torpedo boats, allowing them to escape unharmed. Nubian and Amazon separately ran into a second German formation, the 17th Half Flotilla, with Nubian first being badly damaged by a torpedo and Amazon then heavily hit by German shells.

In 1916, as an attempt to counter the superior range of the 10.5 cm (4.1-in) SK L/45 guns of German torpedo boats, Viking was experimentally rearmed, replacing the forward 4-inch gun with a BL 6-inch Mk VII (alongside HMS Swift, she was one of only two Royal Navy destroyers ever to carry such a weapon). The 6-inch gun proved too large for the Tribal class, and other ships did not receive this modification. On Viking, it was replaced in late 1916 by a QF 4-inch Mk V gun.

== Bibliography ==
- Bacon, Reginald (1918). The Dover Patrol 1915–1917 Volume I. London: Hutchinson & Son.
- Bacon, Reginald (1918). The Dover Patrol 1915–1917 Volume II. London: Hutchinson & Son.
- Brown, D.K. (2003). Warrior to Dreadnought: Warship Development 1860–1905. London: Caxton Editions. ISBN 1-84067-5292.
- Burt, R.A. (1986). Warships Illustrated No 7: British Destroyers in World War One. London: Arms & Armour Press. ISBN 0-85368-753-6.
- Colledge, J. J.; Warlow, Ben (2006) [1969]. Ships of the Royal Navy: The Complete Record of All Fighting Ships of the Royal Navy from the 15th Century to the Present (3rd Rev ed.). London: Chatham Publishing. ISBN 978-1-86176-281-8. OCLC 67375475.
- Dittmar, F. J.; Colledge, J. J. (1972). British Warships 1914–1919. Shepperton, UK: Ian Allan. ISBN 0-7110-0380-7.
- Friedman, Norman (2009). British Destroyers: From Earliest Days to the Second World War. Barnsley, UK: Seaforth Publishing. ISBN 978-1-84832-049-9.
- Gardiner, Robert & Gray, Randal, eds. (1985). Conway's All The World's Fighting Ships 1906–1921. London: Conway Maritime Press. ISBN 0-85177-245-5.
- Grant, Robert M. (1964). U-Boats Destroyed: The Effect of Anti-Submarine Warfare 1914–1918. London: Putnam.
- Manning, T. D. (1961). The British Destroyer. London: Putnam & Co. OCLC 6470051.
- Monograph No. 29: Home Waters Part IV: From February to July 1915 (PDF). Naval Staff Monographs (Historical). Vol. XIII. Naval Staff, Training and Staff Duties Division. 1925.
- Monograph No. 31: Home Waters—Part V: From October 1915 to May 1916 (PDF). Naval Staff Monographs (Historical). Vol. XV. The Naval Staff, Training and Staff Duties Division. 1926.
- Monograph No. 34: Home Waters—Part VIII: December 1916 to April 1917 (PDF). Naval Staff Monographs (Historical). Vol. XVIII. The Naval Staff, Training and Staff Duties Division. 1933.
- March, Edgar J. (1966). British Destroyers: A History of Development, 1892–1953; Drawn by Admiralty Permission From Official Records & Returns, Ships' Covers & Building Plans. London: Seeley Service. OCLC 164893555.
- Newbolt, Henry (1928). History of the Great War: Naval Operations: Vol. IV. London: Longmans Green. OCLC 220475138.
