= HMS Tartar (1907) =

Destroyer of the Royal Navy

- HMS Tartar

History

United Kingdom
- Name: HMS Tartar
- Builder: J I Thornycroft
- Laid down: 13 November 1905
- Launched: 25 June 1907
- Commissioned: 9 April 1908
- Fate: Sold for scrap on 9 May 1921

General characteristics
- Class & type: Tribal-class destroyer
- Length: 255 ft (78 m)
- Beam: 25 ft 6 in (7.77 m)
- Draught: 8 ft 6 in (2.59 m)
- Speed: 33 knots (38 mph; 61 km/h)
- Armament: 5 × QF 12-pounder 12 cwt Mark I guns; 2 × single 18-inch (450 mm) torpedo tubes

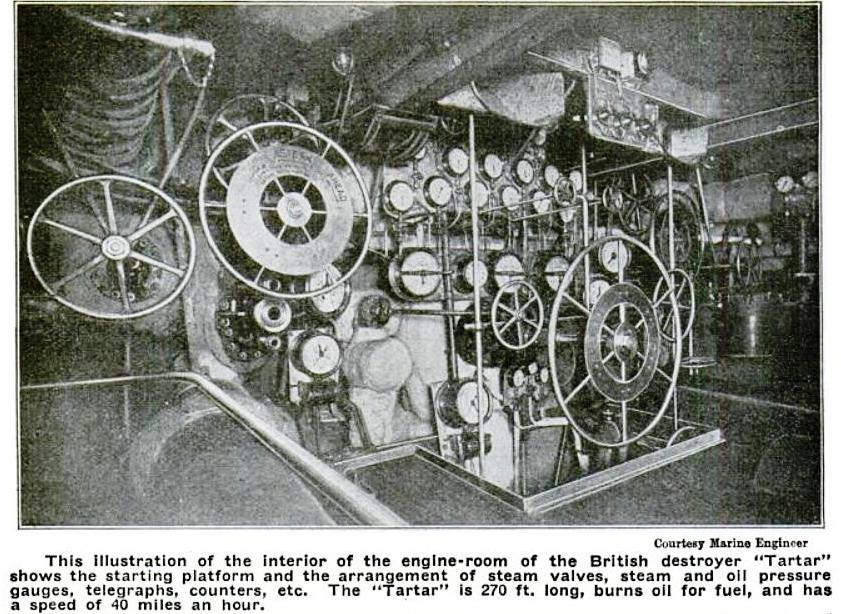
Engine room of HMS Tartar

HMS Tartar was a Tribal-class destroyer of the Royal Navy launched in 1907 and sold in 1921. During the First World War, she served in the North Sea and the English Channel with the 6th Destroyer Flotilla.

== Construction and design ==
HMS Tartar was ordered from the Southampton shipbuilder John I. Thornycroft & Company under the 1905–06 shipbuilding programme for the Royal Navy, one of five Tribal-class destroyers ordered under that programme. The Tribals derived from a requirement by the First Sea Lord "Jackie" Fisher, for a steam turbine powered, oil-fueled destroyer capable of at least 33 knots (61 km/h; 38 mph). Armament was specified as three 12-pounder (3 in, 76 mm) 12 cwt guns (Note: cwt stands for hundredweight, 12 cwt referring to the weight of the gun.) and two 18-inch (450 mm) torpedo tubes. While the Admiralty laid down the basic requirements, the details of the design of individual ships was left to the builders, although the builder's designs did need to be approved by the Director of Naval Construction before orders were placed. This meant that individual ships of the class differed significantly from each other.

Tartar was 274 feet 3 inches (83.59 m) long overall and 270 feet 0 inches (82.30 m) between perpendiculars, with a beam of 26 feet 0 inches (7.92 m) and a draught of 8 feet 4 inches (2.54 m). Displacement was 870 long tons (880 t) normal and 960 long tons (980 t) deep load. Tartar had a turtleback forecastle, but with a raised bow compared with Mohawk (also fitted with a turtleback forecastle), thus avoiding the seakeeping problems that forced Mohawk to be rebuilt with a raised forecastle. Six Thornycroft boilers (in three boiler rooms) fed steam to turbines driving three propeller shafts. The main high-pressure turbine drove the centre shaft, with the outer shafts being fitted with low-pressure turbines, together with cruise and astern turbines. Four funnels were fitted. The ship's machinery was rated at 14,500 shaft horsepower (10,800 kW). The ship had a complement of 74 officers and ratings.

Tartar was laid down at Thornycroft's Woolston shipyard on 13 November 1905 and launched on 25 June 1907. Tartar made 36.3 knots (67.2 km/h; 41.8 mph) during sea trials, with one run during final trials on 16 December reaching a speed of 37.037 knots (68.593 km/h; 42.621 mph), a speed record. (Note: Newspaper reports credited Tartar with speeds as high as 38 knots (70 km/h; 44 mph) in 1909.) She was completed in April 1908. It had been realised during construction that the armament of the Tribals was too light, so it was decided to strengthen the armament of the first five ships of the class by adding another two 12-pounder guns. The two guns were added to Tartar following acceptance by the Royal Navy.

== Service ==
Tartar formed part of the 1st Destroyer Flotilla of the Home Fleet when it was formed in 1909 and remained part of this formation until 1913, when she joined the 4th Destroyer Flotilla based at Portsmouth. In October that year, the Tribals were officially designated the F class, and as such the letter "F" was painted on the bows of the class. In February 1914, the Tribals (including Tartar), as their range was too short for effective open sea operations, were sent to Dover, forming the 6th Destroyer Flotilla. On 8 September 1915, the destroyer Leven was involved in a collision with a transport in the English Channel, suffering a badly damaged bow. She was towed stern first back to Dover, assisted by Tartar, Viking and the tug Lady Crundall.

On the night of 26/27 October 1916, German torpedo boats of their Flanders Flotilla carried out a large scale raid into the English Channel, hoping to attack the drifters watching the anti-submarine nets of the Dover Barrage, and to sink Allied shipping in the Channel. Six Tribal-class destroyers (Tartar, Mohawk, Viking, Nubian, Amazon and Cossack) were being held at readiness at Dover as a fast response force, at readiness in Dover harbour, and when the German 5th Half Flotilla attacked the drifters and sank the old supporting destroyer HMS Flirt, they were ordered to intervene. The destroyers split up as they left Dover harbour, with Viking leading Mohawk and Tartar from the Western entrance to the port, while the other three destroyers left by the Eastern entrance and failed to join up with Viking's group. Nubian and Amazon separately ran into the German 17th Half Flotilla, on its way home after sinking the merchant ship Queen, with Nubian first being badly damaged by a torpedo and Amazon then heavily hit by German shells. Viking's group then encountered a third German formation, the 18th Half Flotilla. Mohawk, second in line of the three British destroyers, was hit by German shells which caused her steering to jam, and turn out of line. Tartar followed Mohawk's turn, while Viking's attempts to pursue the German torpedo boats were thwarted when her course was blocked by Mohawk. All the German torpedo boats that took part in the nights operations escaped successfully.

Tartar struck a German mine on 17 June 1917, killing 43 of her crew, including her newly appointed captain, G. K. Twiss, but was towed to safety. By November 1917, Tartar had joined the 11th Destroyer Flotilla, based at Blyth, Northumberland. On 18 February 1918, Tartar collided with the merchant ship Ardgantock off West Hartlepool, sinking the merchant ship. Tartar still served with the 11th Submarine Flotilla on 11 November 1918, when the Armistice ended fighting between the Allies and Germany.

== Disposal ==
Tartar was sold for scrap on 9 May 1919 to Thos. W. Ward of Hayle.

== Pennant numbers ==
Pennant number	Date
H29	1914
D08	September 1915
D86	January 1918

== Bibliography ==
- Bacon, Reginald (1919). The Dover Patrol 1915–1917 Volume II. London: Hutchinson & Son. OCLC 230639524.
- Colledge, J. J.; Warlow, Ben (2006) [1969]. Ships of the Royal Navy: The Complete Record of All Fighting Ships of the Royal Navy from the 15th Century to the Present (3rd Rev ed.). London: Chatham Publishing. ISBN 978-1-86176-281-8. OCLC 67375475.
- Dittmar, F.J.; Colledge, J. J. (1972). British Warships 1914–1919. Shepperton, UK: Ian Allan. ISBN 0-7110-0380-7.
- Friedman, Norman (2009). British Destroyers: From Earliest Days to the Second World War. Barnsley, UK: Seaforth Publishing. ISBN 978-1-84832-049-9.
- Gardiner, Robert & Gray, Randal, eds. (1985). Conway's All The World's Fighting Ships 1906–1921. London: Conway Maritime Press. ISBN 0-85177-245-5.
- Manning, T. D. (1961). The British Destroyer. London: Putnam & Co. OCLC 6470051.
- March, Edgar J. (1966). British Destroyers: A History of Development, 1892–1953; Drawn by Admiralty Permission From Official Records & Returns, Ships' Covers & Building Plans. London: Seeley Service. OCLC 164893555.
- Newbolt, Henry (1928). History of the Great War: Naval Operations: Vol. IV. London: Longmans Green. OCLC 220475138.
