= HMS Nubian =

Three ships of the Royal Navy have been named HMS Nubian after the people of Nubia.

- HMS Nubian (1909) was a Tribal-class destroyer. Her bows were blown off in 1916, and her mid and aft sections were combined with the bows of the damaged destroyer HMS Zulu, the resulting vessel being named "HMS Zubian".
- HMS Nubian (F36), launched 1937, was a destroyer of another Tribal class.
- HMS Nubian (F131), launched 1960, was a Tribal-class frigate.
