= SS Harpalion =

SS Harpalion is the name of the following ships:

- SS Harpalion (1910), sunk by SM U-8 on 24 February 1915
- SS Harpalion (1932), sunk by U-435 on 13 April 1942 after being bombed by German aircraft and abandoned
- SS Harpalion (1946), ran aground 20 February 1960 and refloated

== See also ==
- Harpalion
