= HMS Ghurka (1907) =

Tribal-class destroyer of the Royal Navy sunk off Dungeness by a German mine

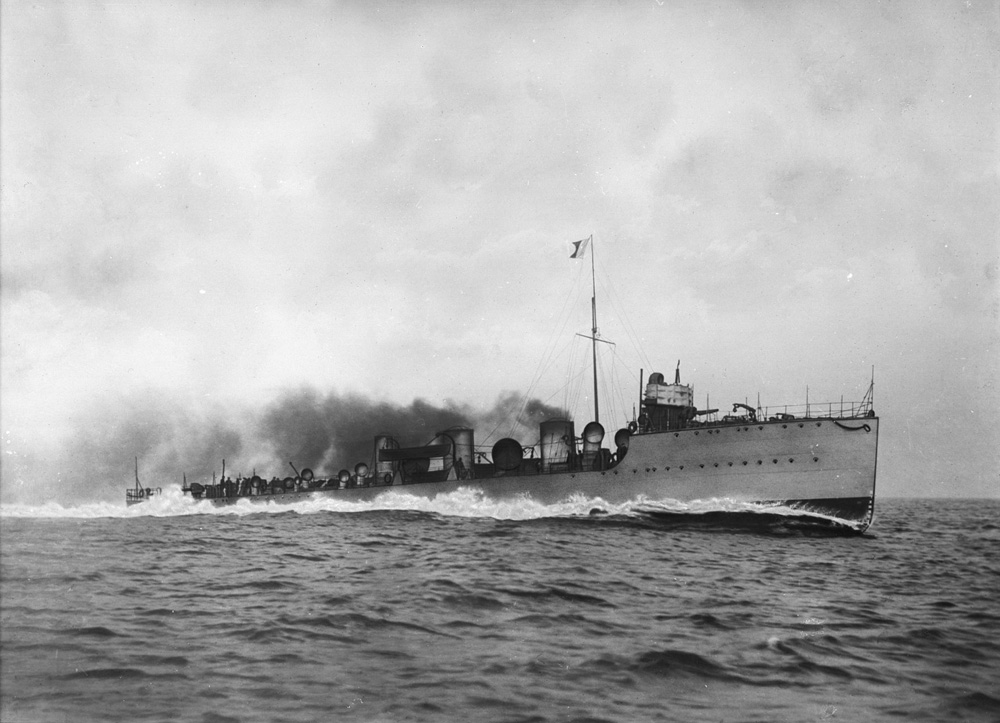
- HMS Ghurka

History

United Kingdom
- Name: HMS Ghurka
- Builder: Hawthorn Leslie and Company, Newcastle upon Tyne
- Laid down: 6 February 1906
- Launched: 29 April 1907
- Commissioned: December 1908
- Fate: Mined, 8 February 1917

General characteristics
- Class & type: Tribal-class destroyer
- Displacement: 880 long tons (894 t) normal; 990 long tons (1,006 t) deep load
- Length: 255 ft 0 in (77.72 m) pp; 260 ft 6 in (79.40 m) oa
- Beam: 25 ft 6 in (7.77 m)
- Draught: 8 ft 6 in (2.59 m)
- Propulsion: 3 × steam turbines; 3 × shafts; 14,250 shp (10,630 kW)
- Speed: 33 kn (38 mph; 61 km/h)
- Range: 1,460 nmi (2,700 km; 1,680 mi) at 15 kn (28 km/h; 17 mph)
- Complement: 72
- Armament: 5 × QF 12-pounder guns, 2 × 18 inch (450 mm) torpedo tubes

HMS Ghurka (Note: The non-standard spelling "Ghurka" was in fact used as the name of this ship.) was a Tribal-class destroyer built in 1907 for the Royal Navy. She served as part of the Dover Patrol during the First World War, playing a part in the sinking of the German submarine U-8 in 1915, and was sunk by a German mine in 1917.

== Construction and design ==
HMS Ghurka was ordered from Hawthorn Leslie as one of five Tribal-class destroyers purchased under the 1905–06 shipbuilding programme. The Tribals derived from a requirement by the First Sea Lord "Jackie" Fisher, for a steam turbine powered, oil-fueled destroyer capable of at least 33 knots (61 km/h; 38 mph). Armament was specified as three 12 pounder (3 inch, 76 mm) 12 cwt guns (Note: cwt stands for hundredweight, 12 cwt referring to the weight of the gun.) and two 18 inch (450 mm) torpedo tubes. The Hawthorn Leslie design for Ghurka was powered by steam turbines fed by five Yarrow boilers, driving three propeller shafts and rated at 14,250 shaft horsepower (10,630 kW). The ship was fitted with three low funnels. A high-pressure turbine drove the centre shaft, while the exhaust steam from this turbine fed two low-pressure turbines on the outer shafts. Separate cruising turbines were also fitted to the outer shafts. Two of the 12 pounder guns were mounted on the ship's forecastle, with the remaining gun situated aft.

Ghurka was laid down at Hawthorn Leslie's shipyard at Hebburn on the River Tyne on 6 February 1906 and launched on 29 April 1907. She reached an average speed of 33.91 knots (62.80 km/h; 39.02 mph) over a six-hour run during trials, and was completed in December 1908. Prior to commissioning, Ghurka's armament was reinforced by adding another two 12 pounder guns.

=== Incidents while Under Construction ===
On 9 January 1908 steamer Hartley proceeding with a cargo of coal sheered and collided with Ghurka moored near the Hawthorn Leslie's shipyard in South Shields, and dealt extensive damage to the destroyers port quarter.

On 13 August 1908 steamer City of Naples while swinging preparing to proceed down river Tyne in South Shields collided with Ghurka moored near Hebburn Buoys, dealing considerable damage to the destroyer's starboard side.

== Service ==
From 1910 to 1913, Ghurka served as part of the First Destroyer Flotilla, and then joined the Fourth Flotilla, based at Portsmouth. In October that year, the Tribals were officially designated the F class, and as such the letter "F" was painted on Ghurka's bows.

The short range of the Tribal class meant that they were unsuitable for long range operations, so, on the outbreak of the First World War, Ghurka, along with the rest of her class, joined the Sixth Destroyer Flotilla based at Dover as part of the Dover Patrol. Ghurka was damaged in a collision with her sister Tribal-class destroyer HMS Cossack on 23 August 1914, requiring repair in dry dock.

On 4 March 1915, the German submarine U-8 became caught in nets laid across the Straits of Dover to indicate the passage of submarines, and the disturbance in the net was spotted by the drifter Roburn, which called up the nearby destroyer patrol, which included Ghurka, as well as Viking, Maori and Nubian. Viking detonated her explosive anti-submarine sweep without effect, but after the submarine was spotted by Maori, Ghurka used her own explosive sweep to force the German submarine to the surface. After briefly being shelled, the submarine was scuttled and abandoned, the crew surrendering. On 10 March 1915, Ghurka made another attack with an explosive sweep which at the time was believed to have probably sunk another submarine, but it was later discovered to be unsuccessful.

Another role of the Dover Patrol was shore bombardment, and Ghurka took part as an escort in the bombardment of Zeebrugge on 23 August 1915.

Ghurka was sunk on 8 February 1917 after hitting a German mine off Dungeness. Only five of the crew survived, with 74 killed. The wreck is located at a depth of 30 metres at 50°51′20″N 0°53′17″E (off Dungeness). It is designated as a "protected place" under the Protection of Military Remains Act 1986.

== Bibliography ==
- Bacon, Reginald (1918). The Dover Patrol 1915–1917 Volume I. London: Hutchinson & Son.
- Bacon, Reginald (1918). The Dover Patrol 1915–1917 Volume II. London: Hutchinson & Son.
- Colledge, J. J.; Warlow, Ben (2006) [1969]. Ships of the Royal Navy: The Complete Record of All Fighting Ships of the Royal Navy from the 15th Century to the Present (3rd Rev ed.). London: Chatham Publishing. ISBN 978-1-86176-281-8. OCLC 67375475.
- Dittmar, F.J.; Colledge, J. J. (1972). British Warships 1914–1919. Shepperton, UK: Ian Allan. ISBN 0-7110-0380-7.
- Friedman, Norman (2009). British Destroyers: From Earliest Days to the Second World War. Barnsley, UK: Seaforth Publishing. ISBN 978-1-84832-049-9.
- Gardiner, Robert & Gray, Randal, eds. (1985). Conway's All The World's Fighting Ships 1906–1921. London: Conway Maritime Press. ISBN 0-85177-245-5.
- Grant, Robert M. (1964). U-Boats Destroyed: The Effect of Anti-Submarine Warfare 1914–1918. London: Putnam.
- Manning, T. D. (1961). The British Destroyer. London: Putnam & Co. OCLC 6470051.
- March, Edgar J. (1966). British Destroyers: A History of Development, 1892–1953; Drawn by Admiralty Permission From Official Records & Returns, Ships' Covers & Building Plans. London: Seeley Service. OCLC 164893555.
- Monograph No. 29: Home Waters: Part IV.: From February to July 1915 (PDF). Naval Staff Monographs (Historical). Vol. XIII. Naval Staff, Training and Staff Duties Division. 1925.
