= HMS Zulu (1909) =

Destroyer of the Royal Navy

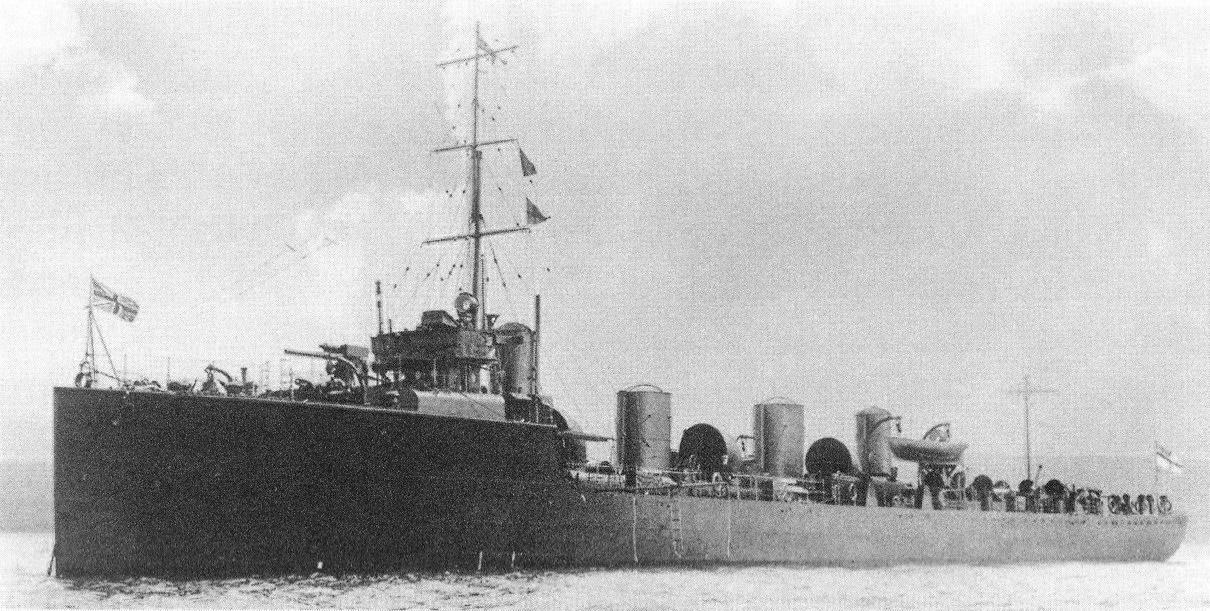
- HMS Zulu

History

United Kingdom
- Name: HMS Zulu
- Builder: Hawthorn Leslie Shipyard
- Laid down: 18 August 1908
- Launched: 16 September 1909
- Commissioned: 19 March 1910
- Honours and awards: Belgian Coast
- Fate: Mined, 8 November 1916 and used to build a second destroyer, HMS Zubian

General characteristics
- Class & type: Tribal-class destroyer
- Displacement: 1,017 long tons (1,033 t) normal, 1,136 long tons (1,154 t) deep load
- Length: 285 ft (86.87 m)
- Beam: 27 ft (8.23 m)
- Draught: 9 ft 4 1/2 in (2.858 m)
- Installed power: 15,500 shp (11,600 kW)
- Propulsion: 4 boilers feeding steam turbines driving three screws
- Speed: 33 kn (61 km/h; 38 mph)
- Range: 1,630 nmi (3,020 km; 1,880 mi) at 15 kn (28 km/h; 17 mph)
- Complement: 71
- Armament: 2 × 4 in (102 mm) guns; 2 × 18 inch (450 mm) torpedo tubes

The first HMS Zulu was a Tribal (or F-) class destroyer launched 16 September 1909 at Hawthorn Leslie Shipyard and commissioned in March 1910. She was mined during the First World War, on 27 October 1916 off Dover in a minefield lain by the Imperial German submarine UC-1. Her stern was blown off and sank, but the forward section remained afloat. It was towed into port and attached to the stern of Nubian, which had been torpedoed, to form a new destroyer named HMS Zubian.

== Construction and design ==
Zulu was one of five Tribal-class destroyers ordered by the British Admiralty in January 1908 under the 1907–1908 shipbuilding programme for the Royal Navy. The Tribal-class destroyers were to be powered by steam turbines and use oil-fuel rather than coal, and be capable of 33 knots (61 km/h; 38 mph), but detailed design was left to the builders, which meant that individual ships of the class differed greatly.

Zulu was 285 feet 0 inches (86.87 m) long overall and 280 feet 1 1/4 inches (85.38 m) between perpendiculars, with a beam of 27 feet 0 inches (8.23 m) and a draught of 9 feet 4 1/2 inches (2.86 m). Normal displacement was 1,017 long tons (1,033 t), with deep load displacement 1,136 long tons (1,154 t). Six Yarrow boilers fed steam to Parsons steam turbines, giving 15,500 shaft horsepower (11,600 kW) and driving three propeller shafts. The main high-pressure turbine drove the centre shaft, with the outer shafts being fitted with low-pressure turbines, together with cruise and astern turbines. The outtakes from the boilers were fed to four funnels. Range was 1,630 nautical miles (3,020 km; 1,880 mi) at 15 knots (28 km/h; 17 mph).

Gun armament consisted of two 4-inch (102 mm) guns, (Note: Gardiner and Gray state that the guns were BL Mk IV, while Friedman claims that they were BL Mk VIII guns.) with two 18-inch (460 mm) torpedo tubes comprising the ship's torpedo armament. The ship had a complement of 71.

Zulu was laid down at Hawthorn Leslie's Hebburn, Tyneside shipyard on 18 August 1908. Construction was slowed by industrial action, and the ship was not launched until 16 September 1909, with the ship crossing the River Tyne on launching, colliding with a jetty. After successful sea trials in December 1909, Zulu was commissioned on 19 March 1910.

== Service ==
On commissioning, Zulu joined the 1st Destroyer Flotilla of the Home Fleet. She remained part of the 1st Flotilla until 1913, when she transferred to the 4th Destroyer Flotilla, based at Portsmouth. In October that year, the Tribals were officially designated the F class, and as such the letter "F" was painted on the bows of the class. In February 1914, the Tribals (including Zulu), whose range was too short for effective open sea operations, were sent to Dover, forming the 6th Destroyer Flotilla.

On the outbreak of the First World War the 6th Flotilla formed the basis of the Dover Patrol. Zulu captured the German sailing ship Perhns on 5 August 1914, and collided with sister ship Crusader in both August and September that year. On 24 April 1916, Zulu took place in a large scale operation off the Belgian coast to lay mines and nets, in an attempt to limit use of the ports of Ostend and Zeebrugge to German U-boats. Zulu and Nubian laid lines of dan-buoys to mark to positions for the minefields and nets to be laid. In total, 1,565 mines were laid by the minelayers Princess Margaret, Orvietto, Paris and Biarritz. The minefield probably caused the loss of one U-Boat, UB-13, although at the time it was thought that four or five German submarines had been sunk. The destroyer Melpomene was badly damaged by shellfire from German coast-defence batteries, while one drifter, Clover Bank, was sunk by a mine.

On 8 November 1916, Zulu was sailing from Dover to Dunkirk when she struck a mine, laid by UC-1, that exploded under the ship's engine-room. Three men were killed, and the ship's stern broke off and sunk. Zulu was towed to safety in Calais by the French destroyer Capitaine Mehl.

It was decided to join the front end of Zulu with the stern of Nubian, another Tribal-class destroyer that had had her bows blown off by a torpedo during the Battle of Dover Strait on the night of 26/27 October 1916. Although these ships were not of identical design, the two sections were joined at Chatham Dockyard to produce a new destroyer, Zubian that commissioned on 7 June 1917.

== Pennant numbers ==
Pennant number	Date
H86	1914
D10	September 1915
