= HMS Mohawk (1907) =

Destroyer of the Royal Navy

- HMS Mohawk on trials in 1907

History

United Kingdom
- Name: HMS Mohawk
- Builder: J S White
- Laid down: 1 May 1906
- Launched: 15 March 1907
- Completed: June 1908
- Fate: Sold for scrap 1919

General characteristics
- Class & type: Tribal-class destroyer
- Displacement: 865 long tons (879 t) normal; 950 long tons (970 t) deep load
- Length: 276 ft 0 in (84.12 m) oa
- Beam: 25 ft 0 in (7.62 m)
- Draught: 8 ft 11 in (2.72 m)
- Propulsion: 6 × White-Foster boilers; Steam turbines, 3 shafts; 14,500 shp (10,800 kW)
- Speed: 33 kn (38 mph; 61 km/h)
- Complement: 74
- Armament: 3 × QF 12-pounder guns, 2 × 18 inch (450 mm) torpedo tubes

HMS Mohawk was a Tribal-class destroyer of the Royal Navy launched in 1907 and sold for scrap in 1919.

During the First World War she served in the North Sea and the English Channel with the 6th Destroyer Flotilla, being damaged by a mine in 1915 and fighting in the Battle of Dover Strait in 1916.

== Construction and design ==
HMS Mohawk was ordered from J. Samuel White under the 1905–06 shipbuilding programme for the Royal Navy, one of five Tribal class destroyers ordered under that programme. The Tribals derived from a requirement by the First Sea Lord "Jackie" Fisher, for a steam turbine powered, oil-fueled destroyer capable of at least 33 knots (61 km/h; 38 mph). Armament was specified as three 12 pounder (3 inch, 76 mm) 12 cwt guns (Note: cwt stands for hundredweight, 12 cwt referring to the weight of the gun.) and two 18 inch (450 mm) torpedo tubes.

While the Admiralty laid down the basic requirements, the details of the design of individual ships was left to the builders, although the builder's designs did need to be approved by the Director of Naval Construction before orders were placed. This meant that individual ships of the class differed significantly from each other. White's design featured a flush deck and a turtleback forecastle. Mohawk was 276 feet 0 inches (84.12 m) long overall and 270 feet 0 inches (82.30 m) between perpendiculars, with a beam of 25 feet 0 inches (7.62 m) and a draught of 8 feet 11 inches (2.72 m). Displacement was 865 long tons (879 t) normal and 950 long tons (970 t) deep load. Six White-Foster boilers fed steam to turbines driving three propeller shafts. The main high-pressure turbine drove the centre shaft, with the outer shafts being fitted with low-pressure turbines, together with cruise and astern turbines. Four funnels were fitted. The machinery was rated at 14,500 shaft horsepower (10,800 kW). The ship had a complement of 74 officers and men.

Mohawk was laid down at White's Isle of Wight shipyard on 1 May 1906 and launched on 15 March 1907. Mohawk's sea trials showed that she was fast, reaching a speed of 34.916 knots (64.664 km/h; 40.181 mph), well in excess of the required 33 knots (61 km/h; 38 mph). Seakeeping was poor, however, with the ship rolling badly, and Mohawk had to be rebuilt with a raised forecastle to give acceptable seakeeping. Mohawk was completed in June 1908. It had been realised during construction that the armament of the Tribals was too light, so it was decided to strengthen the armament of the first five ships, including Mohawk, by adding another two 12-pounder guns. This was done to Mohawk following acceptance by the Royal Navy.

== Service ==
On commissioning, Mohawk joined the other ships of her class in the 1st Destroyer Flotilla of the Home Fleet. She remained part of the 1st Flotilla until 1913, when she transferred to the 4th Destroyer Flotilla, based at Portsmouth. In October that year, the Tribals were officially designated the F class, and as such the letter "F" was painted on the bows of the class. In February 1914, the Tribals (including Mohawk), whose range was too short for effective open sea operations, were sent to Dover, forming the 6th Destroyer Flotilla.

On the outbreak of the First World War the 6th Flotilla formed the basis of the Dover Patrol. An early duty was escorting the ships carrying the British Expeditionary Force to France. A German submarine attempted to attack Mohawk on 6 October, but the destroyer and the ships she was escorting were unharmed. On 1 June 1915 Mohawk encountered a minefield laid by SM UC-11 at the southern entrance to the Downs. Several mines were spotted close to Mohawk which struck one. Five of Mohawk's crew were killed, and Mohawk was towed back to Dover with her decks almost awash.

On the night of 26/27 October 1916, German torpedo boats of their Flanders Flotilla carried out a large scale raid into the English Channel, hoping to attack the drifters watching the anti-submarine nets of the Dover Barrage, and to sink Allied shipping in the Channel. Mohawk was one of six Tribal-class destroyers waiting at readiness in Dover harbour, and when the Germans attacked the drifters and sank the supporting destroyer HMS Flirt, they were ordered to intervene. The destroyers split up as they left Dover harbour, with Viking leading Mohawk and Tartar from the Western entrance to the port, while the other three destroyers (Nubian, Amazon and Cossack) left by the other entrance and failed to join up with Viking's group. Nubian and Amazon separately ran into the German 17th Half Flotilla, with Nubian first being badly damaged by a torpedo and Amazon then heavily hit by German shells. The group led by Viking then encountered another German formation, the 18th Half Flotilla. German shells killed four aboard Mohawk and caused her steering to jam, blocking the course of Viking when she attempted to pursue the German torpedo boats, that escaped unharmed.

Mohawk remained with the 6th Flotilla until 3 October 1917, joining the 10th Submarine Flotilla. Mohawk remained part of the 10th Submarine Flotilla at the end of the war on 11 November 1918. She was sold for scrap on 27 May 1919.

== Pennant Numbers ==
Pennant Number	Date
H19	1914
D05	September 1915
D57	January 1918

== Bibliography ==
- Bacon, Reginald (1919). The Dover Patrol 1915–1917 Volume II. London: Hutchinson & Son. OCLC 230639524.
- Corbett, Julian (1920). History of the Great War: Naval Operations: Vol. I: To the Battle of the Falklands December 1914. London: Longmans Green.
- Colledge, J. J.; Warlow, Ben (2006) [1969]. Ships of the Royal Navy: The Complete Record of All Fighting Ships of the Royal Navy from the 15th Century to the Present (3rd Rev ed.). London: Chatham Publishing. ISBN 978-1-86176-281-8. OCLC 67375475.
- Corbett, Julian (1923). History of the Great War: Naval Operations: Vol. III. London: Longmans Green. OCLC 3759388.
- Dittmar, F.J.; Colledge, J. J. (1972). British Warships 1914–1919. Shepperton, UK: Ian Allan. ISBN 0-7110-0380-7.
- Friedman, Norman (2009). British Destroyers: From Earliest Days to the Second World War. Barnsley, UK: Seaforth Publishing. ISBN 978-1-84832-049-9.
- Gardiner, Robert & Gray, Randal, eds. (1985). Conway's All The World's Fighting Ships 1906–1921. London: Conway Maritime Press. ISBN 0-85177-245-5.
- Manning, T. D. (1961). The British Destroyer. London: Putnam & Co. OCLC 6470051.
- March, Edgar J. (1966). British Destroyers: A History of Development, 1892–1953; Drawn by Admiralty Permission From Official Records & Returns, Ships' Covers & Building Plans. London: Seeley Service. OCLC 164893555.
- Newbolt, Henry (1928). History of the Great War: Naval Operations: Vol. IV. London: Longmans Green. OCLC 220475138.
