= HMS Saracen =

Six ships of the Royal Navy have borne the name HMS Saracen, after the Saracens, a Medieval European term for Muslims:

- HMS Saracen (1804) was an 18-gun Cruizer-class brig-sloop launched in 1804 and broken up in 1812.
- HMS Saracen (1812) was another 18-gun Cruizer-class brig-sloop launched in 1812 and sold in 1819. She then made two voyages between 1819 and 1826 as a whaler.
- HMS Saracen (1831) was a 10-gun Cherokee-class brig-sloop launched in 1831. On 16 October 1839 she captured the Spanish slave trader Brilliante. Saracen was used as a survey vessel from 1854 and exchanged as part-payment in 1862 for a brig named Young Queen, which became the next HMS Saracen.
- HMS Saracen (1862) was a survey brig, previously named Young Queen, purchased in 1862. She was sold in 1870.
- HMS Saracen (1908) was a Tribal-class destroyer launched in 1908 and sold in 1919.
- HMS Saracen (P247) was an S-class submarine launched in 1942 and sunk in 1943.

== See also ==
- HMS Saracen, a 1965 book by Douglas Reeman
