= HMS Cossack (1907) =

Destroyer of the Royal Navy

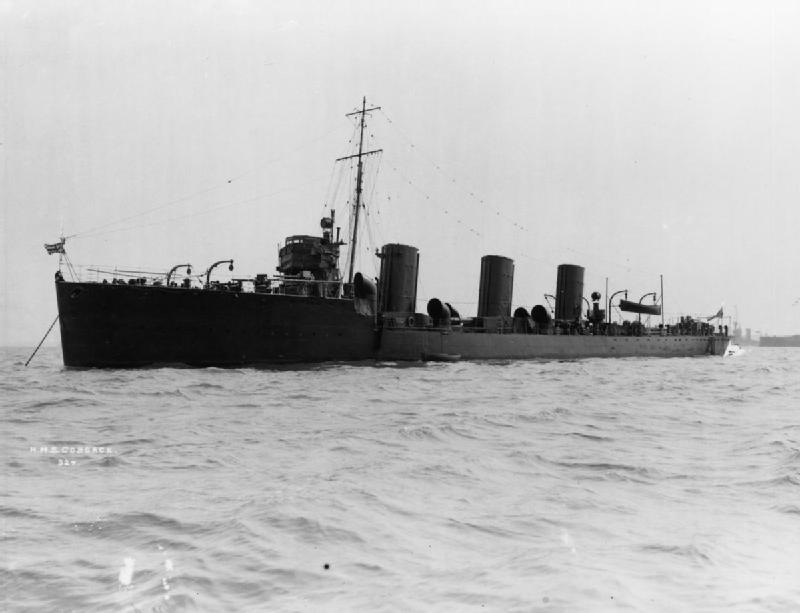
- HMS Cossack

History

United Kingdom
- Name: HMS Cossack
- Builder: Cammell Laird, Birkenhead
- Laid down: 13 November 1905
- Launched: 16 February 1907
- Commissioned: April 1908
- Fate: Sold for scrap, December 1919

General characteristics
- Class & type: Tribal-class destroyer
- Displacement: 885 long tons (899 t) (normal); 975 long tons (991 t) full load
- Length: 270 ft (82.3 m) pp; 277 ft (84.4 m) oa
- Beam: 26 ft (7.9 m)
- Draught: 8 ft 7 in (2.62 m)
- Propulsion: Steam turbines; 3 shafts, 14,000 shp (10,000 kW)
- Speed: 33 kn (38 mph; 61 km/h)
- Range: 1,325 nmi (2,454 km; 1,525 mi) at 15 kn (28 km/h; 17 mph)
- Complement: 72
- Armament: 3 × QF 12 pdr 12 cwt Mark I; 2 × single 18 in (450 mm) torpedo tubes

HMS Cossack was a Tribal-class destroyer of the Royal Navy launched in 1907 and sold in 1919.

== Construction and design ==
HMS Cossack was one of five Tribal-class destroyers ordered as part of the 1905–06 shipbuilding programme. While the Admiralty laid down the basic requirements of an oil-fuelled, steam turbine-powered ship with a speed of 33 knots (61 km/h; 38 mph), a range of 1,500 nautical miles (2,800 km; 1,700 mi) at cruising speed and an endurance of eight hours at full speed, the details of the design of individual ships was left to the builders, which meant that individual ships of the class differed significantly from each other. Cammell Laird's design was powered by steam turbines rated at 14,000 shaft horsepower (10,000 kW) fed by five boilers to drive three propeller shafts, and had three large funnels. Armament was the specified three 12 pounder (3 inch, 76 mm) 12 cwt guns (Note: cwt stands for hundredweight, 12 cwt referring to the weight of the gun.), two side by side on the ship's forecastle and one aft, with two 18 in (450 mm) torpedo tubes.

Cossack was laid down on 13 November 1905 and launched on 16 February 1907. After successfully undergoing trials where she reached a speed of 34.619 knots (64.114 km/h; 39.839 mph), Cossack was commissioned in April 1908.

== Service ==
Shortly after Cossack entered service, it was decided to strengthen the armament of the first batch of Tribals by adding another two 12 pounder guns, this being done in 1909. Cossack was considered by her Captain to be a poorer sea boat than River-class destroyers, (Note: A general problem with the seakeeping of the Tribals was that their forecastle was too short, so that at high speed, the ship's bow wave would wash over the deck.) but a better gun platform.

In 1909, following a re-organisation of the Royal Navy's Home and Atlantic Fleets, Cossack was part of the First Destroyer Flotilla of the Home Fleet. 1910, Cossack remained part of the First Flotilla in 1910. By 1913, she had joined the 4th Destroyer Flotilla, based at Portsmouth. In October that year, the Tribals were officially designated the F class, and as such the letter "F" was painted on Cossack's bows. While still a part of the 4th Flotilla in January 1914, but by February had transferred to the 6th Destroyer Flotilla.

During the First World War she served in the North Sea and the English Channel with the 6th Destroyer Flotilla.

On 23 August 1914, Cossack was involved in a collision with her sister Tribal-class destroyer, Ghurka. In October 1914, Cossack was one of a number of warships of the Dover Patrol that were deployed to help support Belgian ground forces during the Battle of the Yser, with all available ships being used to carry out shore bombardment operations. At one stage, on 20 October 1914, after the destroyer Amazon was damaged by German shellfire, Rear Admiral Horace Hood transferred his flag to Cossack.

On the night of 26/27 October 1916, German torpedo boats of their Flanders Flotilla carried out a large scale raid into the English Channel, hoping to attack the drifters watching the anti-submarine nets of the Dover Barrage, and to sink Allied shipping in the Channel. Cossack was one of six Tribal-class destroyers waiting at readiness in Dover harbour, and when the Germans attacked the drifters and sank the supporting destroyer HMS Flirt, they were ordered to intervene. The six destroyers became separated, and while several of them encountered groups of the German torpedo boats on their return leg, with HMS Nubian being badly damaged by a German torpedo and Amazon and Mohawk sustaining lesser damage from German gunfire, Cossack did not engage the German ships.

On 1 July 1917, Cossack collided with the transport SS The Duchess near Eastbourne. Cossack's depth charges exploded as a result of the collision, sinking The Duchess and blowing off Cossack's stern. Cossack was towed to Dover for repair.

On 16 September 1918, a fire started in one of the magazines of the newly delivered monitor HMS Glatton. In order to prevent an explosion that could affect a nearby ammunition ship, it was decided to sink Glatton. Cossack fired two torpedoes at Glatton, one of which failed to detonate, while the second failed to defeat Glatton's anti-torpedo bulge. In the end, Glatton was sunk by 21 inch (533 mm) torpedoes from the destroyer HMS Myngs.

Cossack was sold to the shipbreakers Thos. W. Ward on 12 December 1919 for scrapping at their Preston, Lancashire, works.

== Pennant numbers ==
Pennant number	Date
H09	1914
D02	September 1915
D19	January 1918

== Bibliography ==
- Bacon, Reginald (1918). The Dover Patrol 1915–1917. Vol. II. London: Hutchinson & Son.
- Brook, Peter (1999). Warships for Export: Armstrong Warships 1867–1927. Gravesend, UK: World Ship Society. ISBN 0-905617-89-4.
- Burt, R.A. (1986). Warships Illustrated No 7: British Destroyers in World War One. London: Arms & Armour Press. ISBN 0-85368-753-6.
- Colledge, J. J.; Warlow, Ben (2006) [1969]. Ships of the Royal Navy: The Complete Record of All Fighting Ships of the Royal Navy from the 15th Century to the Present (3rd Rev ed.). London: Chatham Publishing. ISBN 978-1-86176-281-8. OCLC 67375475.
- Dittmar, F.J.; Colledge, J. J. (1972). British Warships 1914–1919. Shepperton, UK: Ian Allan. ISBN 0-7110-0380-7.
- Friedman, Norman (2009). British Destroyers: From Earliest Days to the Second World War. Barnsley, UK: Seaforth Publishing. ISBN 978-1-84832-049-9.
- Gardiner, Robert & Gray, Randal, eds. (1985). Conway's All The World's Fighting Ships 1906–1921. London: Conway Maritime Press. ISBN 0-85177-245-5.
- Kemp, Paul (1999). The Admiralty Regrets British Warship Losses of the 20th Century. Sutton Publishing Ltd. ISBN 0-7509-1567-6.
- Manning, T. D. (1961). The British Destroyer. London: Putnam & Co. OCLC 6470051.
- March, Edgar J. (1966). British Destroyers: A History of Development, 1892–1953; Drawn by Admiralty Permission From Official Records & Returns, Ships' Covers & Building Plans. London: Seeley Service. OCLC 164893555.
