= HMS Afridi (1907) =

Destroyer of the Royal Navy

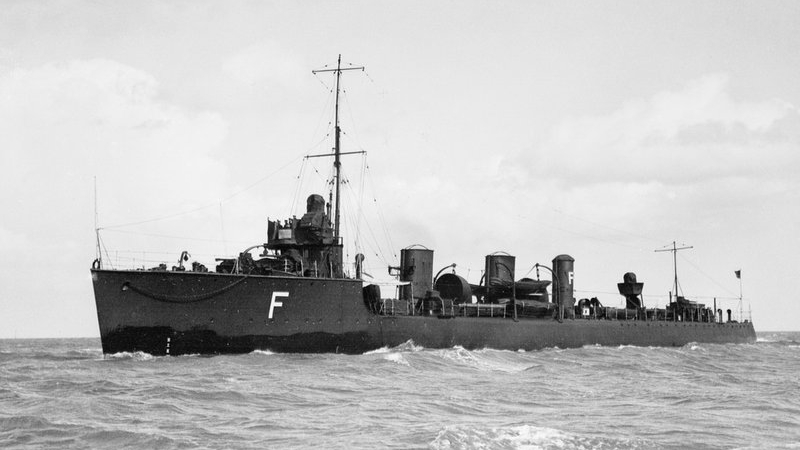
- Afridi

History

United Kingdom
- Name: HMS Afridi
- Ordered: September 1905
- Builder: Armstrong Whitworth, Elswick
- Laid down: 9 August 1906
- Launched: 8 May 1907
- Commissioned: 7 September 1909
- Fate: Sold for scrap, on 9 December 1919

General characteristics
- Class & type: Tribal-class destroyer
- Displacement: 872 long tons (886 t) normal; 966 long tons (982 t) deep load
- Length: 263 ft 6 in (80.31 m) oa; 250 ft (76.20 m) pp
- Beam: 25 ft (7.62 m)
- Draught: 7 ft 6 in (2.29 m)
- Propulsion: Steam turbines, 5 oil-fired Yarrow boilers; 3 shafts; 14,250 shp (10,630 kW); 92.5 tons fuel oil
- Speed: 33 knots (38 mph; 61 km/h)
- Armament: 5 × QF 12-pounder 12 cwt Mark I; 2 × single 18 inch (450 mm) torpedo tubes

HMS Afridi was a Tribal-class destroyer of the Royal Navy launched in 1907 and sold for scrap in 1919. During the First World War she served in the North Sea and the English Channel with the 6th Destroyer Flotilla and as part of the Dover Patrol.

It is assumed - though never definitely confirmed - that explosive sweeps deployed by Afridi were responsible for the destruction of the German U-boat SM UB-13, which on 23 April 1916 departed Zeebrugge for a patrol off the mouth of the Thames and was never heard from again.

== Construction and design ==
HMS Afridi was ordered from Armstrong Whitworth in September 1905, one of five Tribal-class destroyers ordered for the Royal Navy as part of the 1905–06 shipbuilding programme. Design of the ships was left to the builders, with the Admiralty only laying down loose requirements, although the builder's designs did need to be approved by the Director of Naval Construction before orders were placed. The destroyers were required to reach 33 knots (61 km/h; 38 mph), and have a range of 1,500 nautical miles (2,800 km; 1,700 mi) at cruising speed and an endurance of eight hours at full speed. The ships were required to be powered by steam turbines, with cruising turbines fitted to improve range, fed by oil-fired boilers. Freeboard was to be at least 15 feet 6 inches (4.72 m) at the ship's bow. Armament was to be three 12-pounder (3-inch, 76 mm) guns, with the older 12 cwt gun chosen to save money, (Note: cwt stands for hundredweight, 12 cwt referring to the weight of the gun.) and two 18 in (450 mm) torpedo tubes. It was realised during construction that the armament of the Tribals was too light, with the two ships ordered as part of the 1906–07 programme being armed with two 4-inch (102 mm) guns. In October 1908, it was decided to strengthen the armament of the first five Tribals, including Afridi, by adding another two 12-pounder guns. This was done to Afridi prior to acceptance by the Royal Navy.

Armstrong's design used five Yarrow water-tube boilers to feed steam turbines supplied by the Parsons Marine Steam Turbine Company rated at 14,250 shp (10,630 kW). These drove three propeller shafts, with one propeller per shaft. Three short funnels were fitted. The two forward 12-pounder guns were mounted side-by-side on the ship's forecastle, with the third gun aft. Two spare torpedoes were carried.

Afridi was laid down at Armstrong's Elswick shipyard in August 1906 (Note: Sources differ as to the date of the ship being laid down, with Friedman stating 9 August 1906 while Brook states 10 August.) and was launched on 8 May 1907. The ship's trials were troublesome, with propeller and turbine problems being encountered, with poor weather and industrial action causing delays. She finally met her contract speed during February 1909, when a speed of 33.25 knots (61.58 km/h; 38.26 mph) was reached, although this required forcing the ship's engines to give 21,000 shp (16,000 kW).

== Service ==
Afridi was commissioned on 10 September 1909, 26 months after the contracted date, the last destroyer to be built by Armstrongs, joining the 1st Destroyer Flotilla. By 1913, Afridi had joined the 4th Destroyer Flotilla, based at Portsmouth. In October that year, the Tribals were officially designated the F class, and as such the letter "F" was painted on Afridi's bow.

In February 1914, the Tribals, whose range was too short for effective open sea operations, were sent to Dover, forming the 6th Destroyer Flotilla. On the outbreak of the First World War, the 6th Flotilla formed the basis of the Dover Patrol, with which the Tribal class, including Afridi, served for the duration of the war. Early in the war, the main means of detecting submerged submarines was the indicator net, in which a submarine would get caught up in the net, with movement of an attached buoy indicating the location of the submarine. On 20 February 1915, the destroyer Viking spotted a disturbance in indicator nets in the Dover Straits, and signalled to Afridi to deploy her explosive anti-submarine sweep, but no submarine was found. On 6 April 1915, the drifter Hyacinth spotted a periscope of the German submarine SM U-33 and called up Afridi, which was nearby. While the submarine carried away a section of the netting, the indicator buoys did not deploy, so U-33 was able to escape unscathed.

On 24 March 1916, the cross-Channel ferry Sussex was torpedoed by the German submarine SM UB-29. Afridi was one of a number of destroyers sent to respond to distress signals from the damaged ferry, and helped in the rescue operations.

In order to counter German destroyers armed with 105 mm guns, which outgunned British destroyers of the Dover patrol, a number of the Tribal class were rearmed. Afridi had her 12-pounder guns replaced by two 4.7-inch (120 mm) QF guns between April and October 1917, also receiving a single 2-pounder "pom-pom" autocannon anti-aircraft gun and a Maxim machine gun.

On 22–23 April, Afridi took part in an attack on the German-held port of Ostend in Belgium, which took place at the same time as a similar attack on Zeebrugge, with the objective of denying the use of these ports for German surface vessels and submarines. Afridi formed part of the escort for the blockships HMS Sirius and HMS Brilliant, which were to be scuttled in the harbour entrance, while monitors bombarded the port with heavy guns. While the attack on Zeebrugge was a partial success, the Ostend part of the operation was a failure, as the blockships missed the entry to the harbour and run aground, so that the port was not blocked.

Afridi along with Zubian, Cossack and Viking were all offered for sale at Immingham in November 1919. Afridi was sold for scrapping on 9 December 1919, and was eventually sunk as a target on 9 April 1930.

== Bibliography ==
- Brook, Peter (1999). Warships for Export: Armstrong Warships 1867–1927. Gravesend, UK: World Ship Society. ISBN 0-905617-89-4.
- Burt, R.A. (1986). Warships Illustrated No 7: British Destroyers in World War One. London: Arms & Armour Press. ISBN 0-85368-753-6.
- Colledge, J. J.; Warlow, Ben (2006) [1969]. Ships of the Royal Navy: The Complete Record of All Fighting Ships of the Royal Navy from the 15th Century to the Present (3rd Rev ed.). London: Chatham Publishing. ISBN 978-1-86176-281-8. OCLC 67375475.
- Dittmar, F.J.; Colledge, J. J. (1972). British Warships 1914–1919. Shepperton, UK: Ian Allan. ISBN 0-7110-0380-7.
- Friedman, Norman (2009). British Destroyers: From Earliest Days to the Second World War. Barnsley, UK: Seaforth Publishing. ISBN 978-1-84832-049-9.
- Gardiner, Robert & Gray, Randal, eds. (1985). Conway's All The World's Fighting Ships 1906–1921. London: Conway Maritime Press. ISBN 0-85177-245-5.
- Manning, T. D. (1961). The British Destroyer. London: Putnam & Co. OCLC 6470051.
- March, Edgar J. (1966). British Destroyers: A History of Development, 1892–1953; Drawn by Admiralty Permission From Official Records & Returns, Ships' Covers & Building Plans. London: Seeley Service. OCLC 164893555.
- Monograph No. 29: Home Waters—Part IV: From February to July 1915 (PDF). Naval Staff Monographs (Historical). Vol. XIII. The Naval Staff, Training and Staff Duties Division. 1925.
