= SS Harpalion (1910) =

British cargo ship sunk in 1915

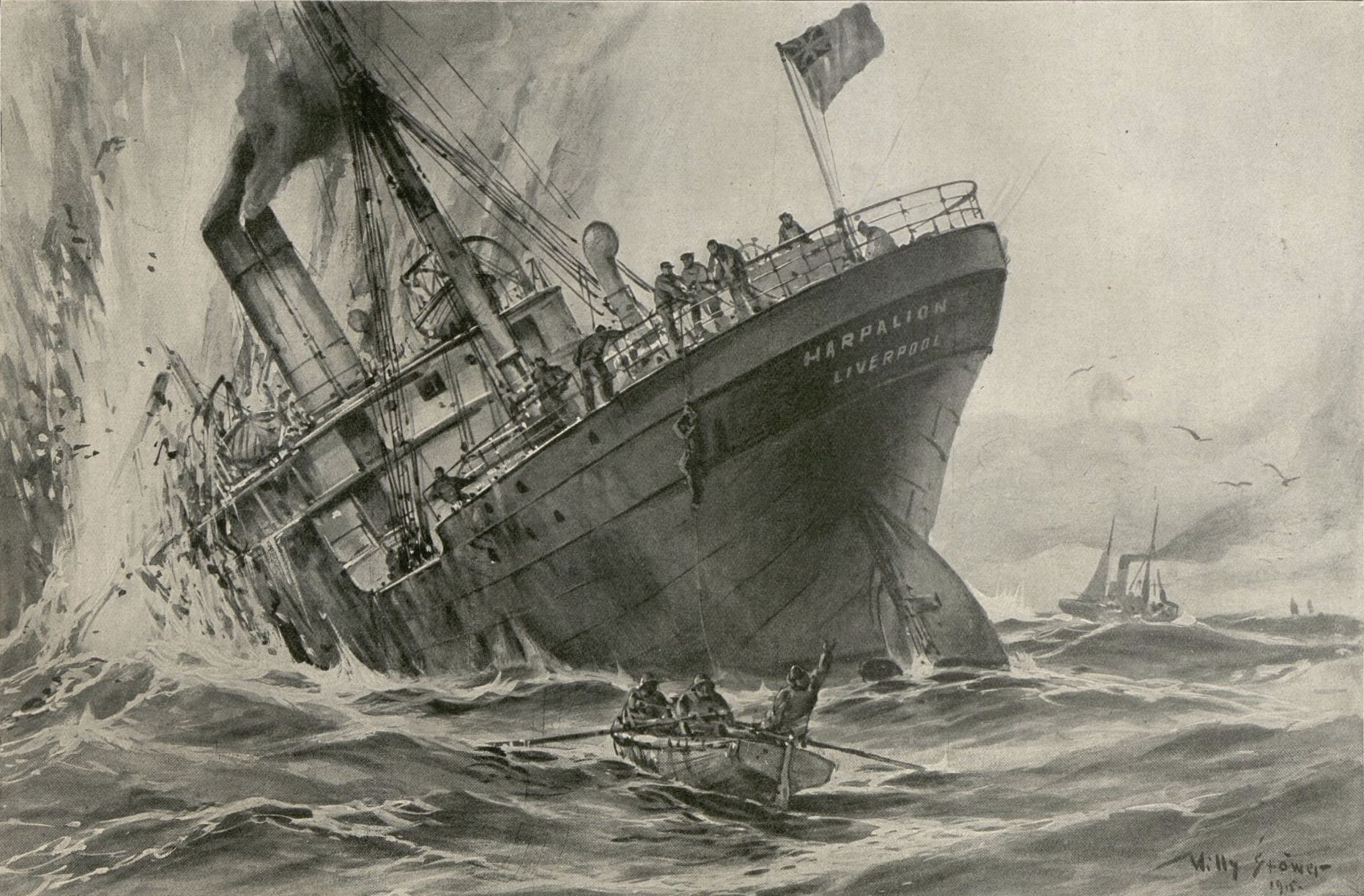
- A painting by Willy Stöwer of Harpalion sinking

History

United Kingdom
- Name: Harpalion
- Namesake: Harpalion
- Owner: J&C Harrison
- Port of registry: London
- Builder: Wm Gray & Co, West Hartlepool
- Yard number: 779
- Launched: 4 October 1910
- Completed: November 1910
- Identification: UK official number 129152; code letters HRWF
- Fate: sunk by torpedo, 24 February 1915

General characteristics
- Type: cargo steamship
- Tonnage: 5,867 GRT, 3,669 NRT
- Length: 428.0 ft (130.5 m)
- Beam: 53.5 ft (16.3 m)
- Depth: 29.1 ft (8.9 m)
- Decks: 2
- Installed power: 1 × triple expansion engine, 574 NHP
- Propulsion: 1 × screw
- Speed: 12 knots (22 km/h)
- Notes: sister ships: Harpagus, Harpalyce

SS Harpalion was a British cargo steamship. She was built in 1910 for J&C Harrison of London, and sunk by a U-boat in 1915. She is one of at least three cargo ships to have borne the name Harpalion from Greek mythology. J&C Harrison had a later steamship of the same name that was built in 1932 and sunk in 1942. The National Steamship Co had a motor ship of the same name that was built in 1947 and scrapped in 1979.

== Building and registration ==
In 1910 and 1911, William Gray and Company of West Hartlepool, County Durham, built three sister ships for J&C Harrison. Yard number 771 was launched in April 1910 as Harpagus, and completed that June. Yard number 779 was launched on 4 October 1910 as Harpalion, and completed that November. Yard number 789 was launched in May 1911 as Harpalyce, and completed that June.

Harpalion's registered length was 428.0 ft (130.5 m), her beam was 53.5 ft (16.3 m), and her depth was 29.1 ft (8.9 m). Her tonnages were 5,867 GRT and 3,669 NRT. She had a single screw, driven by a three-cylinder triple expansion engine made by the Central Marine Engine Works in West Hartlepool. It was rated at 574 NHP, and gave her a speed of 12 knots (22 km/h).

J&C Harrison registered Harpalion at London. Her UK official number was 129152, and her code letters were HRWF.

== Loss ==
In February 1915, Harpalion left London in ballast for Cape Henry, Virginia. On 24 February she steaming west in the English Channel, when SM U-8 torpedoed her, 6.5 nautical miles (12 km) west of the Royal Sovereign lightship. The explosion burst one of the boilers in her stokehold, killing three of her Chinese stokers, and badly scalding her third engineer.

Harpalion did not immediately sink, and various merchant ships and warships sighted her. A tugboat from Le Havre to take her in tow, but Harpalion sank shortly after the tug reached her. All of Harpalion's surviving crew were rescued, and her third engineer was hospitalised at Newhaven.

== Bibliography ==
- Lloyd's Register of British and Foreign Shipping. Vol. II.–Steamers. London: Lloyd's Register of Shipping. 1911 – via Internet Archive.
- Mercantile Navy List. London: Registrar General of Shipping and Seamen. 1911 – via Crew List Index Project.
