= HMS Crusader (1909) =

Destroyer of the Royal Navy

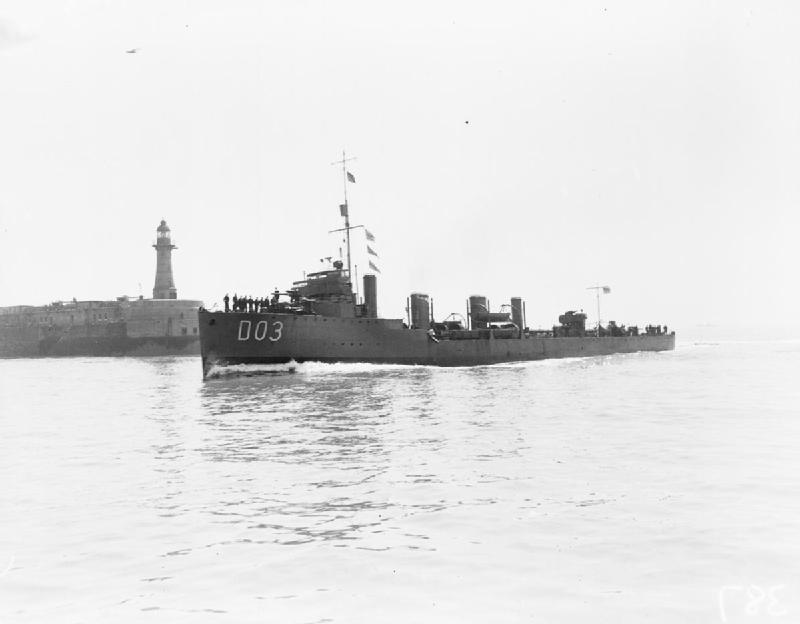
- HMS Crusader

History

United Kingdom
- Name: HMS Crusader
- Builder: J S White
- Launched: 20 March 1909
- Honours and awards: Belgian Coast, 1914-16
- Fate: Sold for Scrap 1920

General characteristics
- Class & type: Tribal-class destroyer
- Length: 255 ft (78 m)
- Beam: 25 ft 6 in (7.77 m)
- Draught: 8 ft 6 in (2.59 m)
- Speed: 33 kn (38 mph; 61 km/h)
- Armament: 2 × 4 in (102 mm); 2 × single 18 inch (450 mm) torpedo tubes

HMS Crusader was a Tribal-class destroyer of the Royal Navy launched in 1909. During the First World War she served in the North Sea and the English Channel with the 6th Destroyer Flotilla. Following the War she was sold for scrap to Thos. W. Ward on 30 June 1920 for scrapping at Preston.

== Publications ==
- Colledge, J. J.; Warlow, Ben (2006) [1969]. Ships of the Royal Navy: The Complete Record of All Fighting Ships of the Royal Navy from the 15th Century to the Present (3rd Rev ed.). London: Chatham Publishing. ISBN 978-1-86176-281-8. OCLC 67375475.
- Dittmar, F.J.; Colledge, J. J. (1972). British Warships 1914–1919. Shepperton, UK: Ian Allan. ISBN 0-7110-0380-7.
- Friedman, Norman (2009). British Destroyers: From Earliest Days to the Second World War. Barnsley, UK: Seaforth Publishing. ISBN 978-1-84832-049-9.
- Gardiner, Robert & Gray, Randal, eds. (1985). Conway's All The World's Fighting Ships 1906–1921. London: Conway Maritime Press. ISBN 0-85177-245-5.
- Manning, T. D. (1961). The British Destroyer. London: Putnam & Co. OCLC 6470051.
- March, Edgar J. (1966). British Destroyers: A History of Development, 1892–1953; Drawn by Admiralty Permission From Official Records & Returns, Ships' Covers & Building Plans. London: Seeley Service. OCLC 164893555.
