= HMS Zubian =

1917 destroyer from Britain

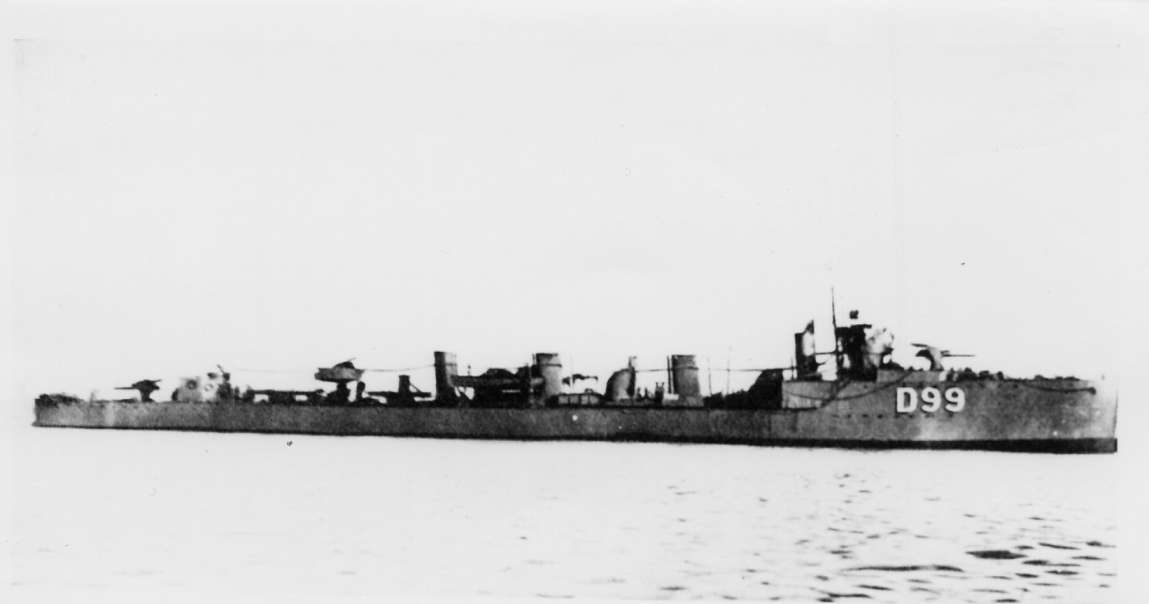
- HMS Zubian

History

United Kingdom
- Name: HMS Zubian
- Builder: Chatham Dockyard
- Commissioned: 7 June 1917
- Fate: Scrapped 9 December 1919

General characteristics
- Class & type: Tribal-class destroyer
- Displacement: 1,040 t (1,020 long tons; 1,150 short tons)
- Length: 85.4 m (280 ft)
- Beam: 8.2 m (27 ft)
- Draught: 3 m (9.8 ft)
- Installed power: 6 Thornycroft boilers; 14,000 shp (10,000 kW)
- Propulsion: 3 Parsons steam turbines
- Speed: 33 kn (38 mph; 61 km/h)
- Complement: 68 officers + ratings
- Armament: 2 × QF 4-inch Mk V guns; 2 × 18 inch (450 mm) torpedo tubes

HMS Zubian was a First World War Royal Navy Tribal-class destroyer constructed from the forward end of HMS Zulu and the rear and mid sections of HMS Nubian. These two destroyers had been badly damaged in late 1916, and rather than scrapping both hulls at the height of World War I, the Admiralty ordered that they be rebuilt as the composite Zubian and put back into service. She was commissioned into the fleet in June 1917. The name Zubian is a portmanteau of the names of the original ships.

Zubian saw extensive service in the final two years of the war as part of the Dover Patrol. She sank the German U-boat UC-50 in February 1918, while she was on patrol in the English Channel. In late April, she participated in the First Ostend Raid as an escort for the bombardment force. After the war, Zubian was sold for scrap and broken up by December 1919.

== Design ==
Zubian was 85.4 metres (280 ft) long overall, with a beam of 8.2 m (27 ft) and a draught of 3 m (9.8 ft). She displaced 1,040 long tons (1,060 t). The ship's propulsion system consisted of three Parsons steam turbines, which were powered by six oil-fired Thornycroft boilers. These provided 14,000 shaft horsepower (10,000 kW) and a top speed of 33 knots (61 km/h; 38 mph). She was armed with two QF 4-inch Mk V guns and two 18-inch (450 mm) torpedo tubes. One gun was mounted on the forecastle and the other on the stern, with the two torpedo tubes amidships. Her crew numbered 68 officers and ratings.

== Service history ==
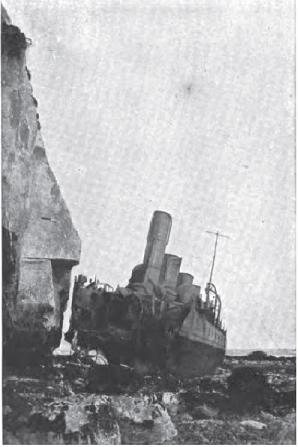
Nubian with bow blown off and aground in 1916

In late 1916, two British destroyers of the 6th Flotilla in the Dover Patrol—Nubian and Zulu—were badly damaged by German attacks in the English Channel. Nubian's bow had been destroyed by a torpedo from a German torpedo boat on 27 October in the Battle of Dover Strait, while Zulu had her stern blown off by a mine in the Channel on 8 November, and was towed to Calais. Both wrecks were then towed to Chatham Dockyard, where a complete destroyer was constructed by joining the foreparts of Zulu with the stern of Nubian, and despite a 3.5 inches (89 mm) difference in beam, the unique operation was successful. The ship was renamed Zubian by Admiral Reginald Bacon, the commander of the Dover Patrol. The hybrid destroyer was commissioned on 7 June 1917. The choice of name caused confusion among the German Imperial Admiralty Staff, who knew of no such ship under construction.

Zubian joined the 6th Flotilla and served there until the end of the war. During this period, Zubian and the rest of the Flotilla rotated through nighttime patrols of the Dover Strait in groups of four, supported by flotilla leaders; these patrols were intended to catch German torpedo boats that were conducting night bombardments of Allied positions in the Channel. While in the Dover Strait on 4 February 1918, she encountered the mine-laying U-boat UC-50, which was surfaced about 400 yards (370 m) off Zubian's port bow with her radio antennae up. Zubian attempted to ram the submarine but the Germans managed to submerge. The destroyer then dropped depth charges over the submerged U-boat and a significant amount of oil and wreckage was observed thereafter. Zubian marked the location with a buoy and an hour later, the patrol vessel HMS P12 dropped additional depth charges there. Trawlers later located an object that divers confirmed was UC-50.

Zubian also participated in the First Ostend Raid two months later on the night of 23–24 April. The attack was intended to close the German-held ports of Ostend and Zeebrugge, which were being used as bases for the U-boats. Zubian was assigned to the bombardment force, and along with the destroyers Mentor and Lightfoot, provided the close escort for a group of six monitors. The bombardment unit was covered by the Harwich Force in the Channel. The bombardment force was tasked with suppressing the German coastal defences, while a pair of old cruisers attempted to steam into the harbour entrances, where they would be sunk as blockships. The effort failed when both cruisers ran aground far outside of the harbour.

Worn out by heavy wartime use, Zubian was sold in the immediate post-war draw down and broken up for scrap by December 1919.
