= Harpalion =

In Greek mythology, the name Harpalion (Ancient Greek: Ἁρπαλίων) may refer to:

- Harpalion of Lemnos, a wine-grower, father of the Maenad Alcimacheia.
- Harpalion, son of Pylaemenes, killed by Meriones in the Trojan War.
- Harpalion, son of Arizelus and Amphinome, from Boeotia, who fought under Prothoenor in the Trojan War and was killed by Aeneas.

== See also ==
- SS Harpalion, ships with the name
- 6443 Harpalion, a minor planet
