= HMS Nubian (1909) =

Destroyer of the Royal Navy

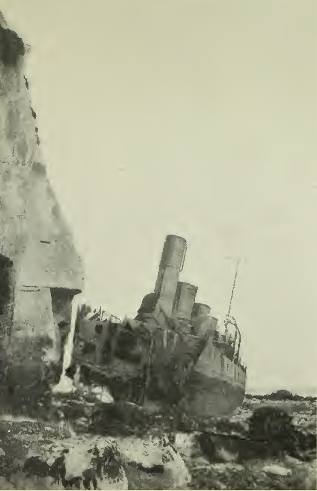
- HMS Nubian aground on the South Foreland after her bows had been blown off in October 1916

History

United Kingdom
- Name: HMS Nubian
- Builder: John I. Thornycroft & Company
- Launched: 20 April 1909
- Fate: Torpedoed 27 October 1916; undamaged stern joined with bow of HMS Zulu and renamed HMS Zubian

General characteristics
- Class & type: Tribal-class destroyer
- Length: 255 ft (77.7 m)
- Beam: 25 ft 6 in (7.8 m)
- Draught: 8 ft 6 in (2.6 m)
- Speed: 33 kn (38 mph; 61 km/h)
- Armament: 2 × 4 in (102 mm) guns; 2 × single 18 in (450 mm) torpedo tubes

HMS Nubian was a Royal Navy Tribal-class destroyer. She was launched in 1909 and torpedoed in 1916. With her bow blown off, the wreck was used to create a new ship by joining the bow of another destroyer of the same class, HMS Zulu. The resulting ship was given the portmanteau name HMS Zubian. She went on to sink the U-boat SM UC-50 in 1918 and was scrapped in 1919.

== Commissioning ==
Nubian was launched on 20 April 1909, her keel plate having been laid down on 18 May 1908 at the Thornycroft yard in Woolston, Southampton. The ship was commissioned for service in the First Destroyer Flotilla by Commander Colin McKenzie at Sheerness on 3 September 1909. Powered by oil-fired steam turbines producing a total of around 15,500 horsepower (11,600 kW), she replaced a River-class destroyer in the flotilla. Steam trials had taken place at the mouth of the Thames in June of that year.

A 280-foot (85 m) long, four-funnelled, triple-screwed ship with a beam of 26.5 feet (8.1 m), Nubian displaced slightly under 1,000 tons and had a crew of 70. She could sail at 33 kn (38 mph; 61 km/h) and had a pair of BL 4-inch (102 mm) guns, one mounted at the fore and one aft, as well as two torpedo tubes.

== Movements ==
The First Destroyer Flotilla was based at Harwich with the purpose of defending Britain's east coast. It was planned to include 12 ocean-going destroyers capable of 33 knots. (Note: Sources differ regarding whether the First Destroyer Flotilla included a further 12 River-class ships, which could attain 25 kn (29 mph; 46 km/h), as well as the Tribal class, or whether the Tribal-class ships replaced those of the River class. At the time of a major gathering of the fleet off the coast of Cornwall, near Penzance, in July 1910, the Flotilla comprised Zulu, Viking, Maori, Nubian, Amazon, Saracen, Afrida, Cossack, Tartar, Mohawk, Ghurka, Boyne, Garry, Ness, Nith, Ribble, Rother, Swale, Teviot, Usk, Waveney, Wear, Welland, and Beagle. Flotilla support vessels at that time were Assistance and Cyclops (repair ships), Maine (hospital), Adventure, Blenheim, Boadicea, Pathfinder, and Swift.) Within a month of commissioning, Nubian had taken part in exercises at the Cromarty Firth with ships including Saracen, Mohawk and Ghurka.

The flotilla was present at a gathering of the Royal Navy fleet near to Penzance in July 1910 and in September that year Nubian had her annual refit at Chatham Dockyard. In March 1911, she and other members of the flotilla moved from Harwich to Portland, while the Second Destroyer Flotilla moved away from there to Plymouth. She was at Kirkwall in May 1911 and took part in the huge naval review at Spithead in June.

Nubian had a refit and basin trials of her machinery at Chatham in May 1912 before joining the Fourth Destroyer Flotilla at Portland for exercises in the English Channel. Together with fellow Fourth Destroyer Flotilla Tribal-class ships Amazon and Zulu, and the cruiser Bristol from the Second Squadron, Nubian sailed up the Manchester Ship Canal on 24 May that year to take part in a Whitsuntide display at the city. Most sources say that a smaller ship, Hope, was in attendance but some say that it was the battleship Monarch. Mooring at Trafford Wharf, members of the public were allowed to board the ships over three days. The visit coincided with Empire Day and generated much excitement, with 80,000 people visiting the docks on a single day and an estimated 100,000 being turned away due to overcrowding.

Another refit took place at Chatham in September 1912 and it returned there in December. A visit to Sheerness with the Fourth Destroyer Flotilla followed prior to the group returning to its Portland base in January 1913. Nubian had come top of its class in the 1912 battle practice (long range firing under war conditions), scoring 102 points.

Some of the flotilla, including Nubian, visited Bantry Bay and Queenstown in February 1913 during exercises. They returned to Sheerness and then to Chatham in March. The ship took part in further exercises later that year, at Fortrose and at Longhope, Orkney, before returning to Portland. In November, she acted as a tow for kites being used as targets in anti-aircraft gun tests at Needles Battery on the Isle of Wight, where her speed was remarked on. The Admiralty reported that she was among the top placed ships of that year's battle practice.

By February 1914, Nubian and seven other Tribal-class destroyers were part of the Third Destroyer Flotilla but none were so for long. In May 1914, Nubian became a tender for the gunnery establishment HMS Excellent.

Nubian was among the ships that successfully hunted the German submarine SM U-8 in March 1915, although the fatal blows were delivered by Ghurka and HMS Maori. (Note: Items taken from U-8 by a Nubian crewmember as it was sinking were soon after displayed in a shop at Southsea.) A month later, it was reported that she had been among many ships that participated in a bombardment of German positions on the coast of Belgium during October–November 1914.

== Torpedoing and reconstruction ==
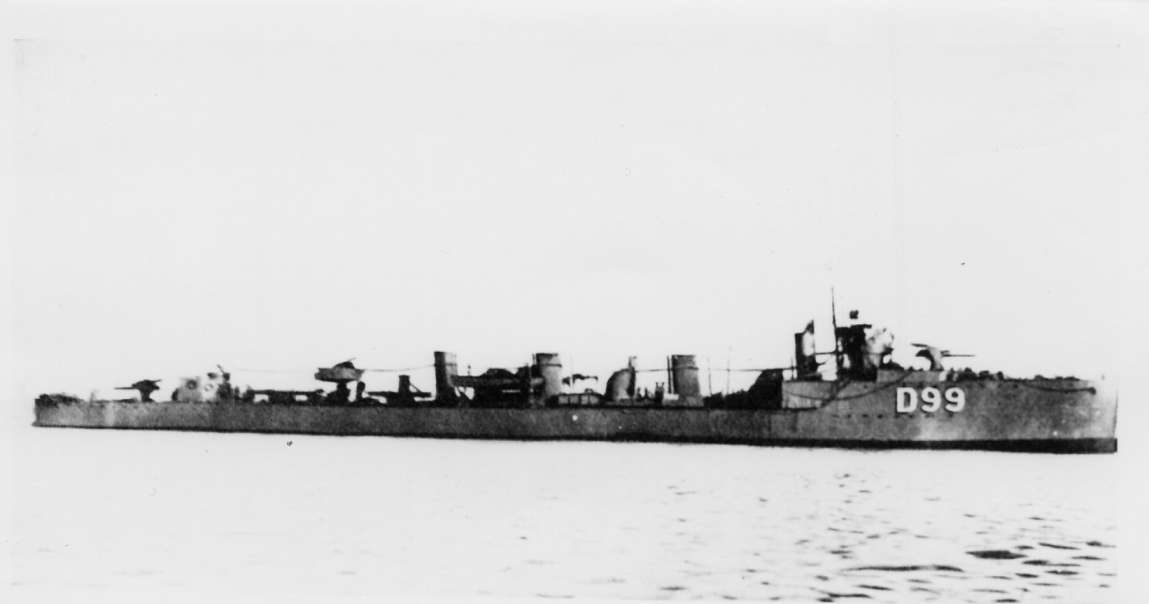
HMS Zubian, formed from the remains of Nubian and HMS Zulu

During the Battle of Dover Strait, on the night of 26–27 October 1916 off Folkestone Nubian's bow was almost severed by a German torpedo that exploded almost under her bridge. She was taken in tow but the tow-ropes severed in the bad weather conditions and she ran aground on the South Foreland, near Dover. The bow then parted completely on a chalk reef and the remainder of the ship was driven under a cliff. Two of the crew of Nubian died and a further thirteen were missing, believed killed.

Nubian was eventually refloated when a cutting was blasted through the rocks. Another Tribal-class destroyer, Zulu, had her stern blown off by a naval mine near Dunkirk on 8 November 1916 and was towed to Calais. Both wrecks were towed to Chatham Dockyard and Zulu's bow was joined to the midsection and stern of Nubian. The resulting destroyer was given the portmanteau name Zubian. This ship served until the end of the war, sinking the mine-laying U-boat SM UC-50 on 4 February 1918 off the coast of Essex.

== Fate ==
Zubian was broken up at Sunderland in 1919.

== Bibliography ==
- Colledge, J. J.; Warlow, Ben (2006) [1969]. Ships of the Royal Navy: The Complete Record of All Fighting Ships of the Royal Navy from the 15th Century to the Present (3rd Rev ed.). London: Chatham Publishing. ISBN 978-1-86176-281-8. OCLC 67375475.
- Dittmar, F.J.; Colledge, J. J. (1972). British Warships 1914–1919. Shepperton, UK: Ian Allan. ISBN 0-7110-0380-7.
- Friedman, Norman (2009). British Destroyers: From Earliest Days to the Second World War. Barnsley, UK: Seaforth Publishing. ISBN 978-1-84832-049-9.
- Gardiner, Robert & Gray, Randal, eds. (1985). Conway's All The World's Fighting Ships 1906–1921. London: Conway Maritime Press. ISBN 0-85177-245-5.
- Manning, T. D. (1961). The British Destroyer. London: Putnam & Co. OCLC 6470051.
- March, Edgar J. (1966). British Destroyers: A History of Development, 1892–1953; Drawn by Admiralty Permission From Official Records & Returns, Ships' Covers & Building Plans. London: Seeley Service. OCLC 164893555.
