= HMS Saracen (1908) =

Destroyer of the Royal Navy

History

United Kingdom
- Name: Saracen
- Builder: J S White
- Launched: 31 March 1908
- Commissioned: 25 June 1908
- Fate: Sold for scrap 1919

General characteristics
- Class & type: Tribal-class destroyer
- Length: 255 ft (78 m)
- Beam: 25 ft 6 in (7.77 m)
- Draught: 8 ft 6 in (2.59 m)
- Speed: 33 kn (38 mph; 61 km/h)
- Armament: 2 × 4 in (102 mm); 2 × single 18 inch (450 mm) torpedo tubes

HMS Saracen was a Tribal-class destroyer of the Royal Navy launched in 1908 and sold in 1919. Originally allocated to the 1st Destroyer Flotilla, during the First World War she served in the North Sea and the English Channel with the 6th Destroyer Flotilla.

== Bibliography ==
- Colledge, J. J.; Warlow, Ben (2006) [1969]. Ships of the Royal Navy: The Complete Record of All Fighting Ships of the Royal Navy from the 15th Century to the Present (3rd Rev ed.). London: Chatham Publishing. ISBN 978-1-86176-281-8. OCLC 67375475.
- Dittmar, F.J.; Colledge, J. J. (1972). British Warships 1914–1919. Shepperton, UK: Ian Allan. ISBN 0-7110-0380-7.
- Friedman, Norman (2009). British Destroyers: From Earliest Days to the Second World War. Barnsley, UK: Seaforth Publishing. ISBN 978-1-84832-049-9.
- Gardiner, Robert & Gray, Randal, eds. (1985). Conway's All The World's Fighting Ships 1906–1921. London: Conway Maritime Press. ISBN 0-85177-245-5.
- Manning, T. D. (1961). The British Destroyer. London: Putnam & Co. OCLC 6470051.
- March, Edgar J. (1966). British Destroyers: A History of Development, 1892–1953; Drawn by Admiralty Permission From Official Records & Returns, Ships' Covers & Building Plans. London: Seeley Service. OCLC 164893555.
