= SMS S51 =

List of ships with the same or similar names

Two ships of the German Imperial Navy were named SMS S51. They were both torpedo boats built by Schichau-Werke.

- SMS S51 (1889) - torpedo boat launched by Schichau on 28 November 1889. Renamed T51 in 1910. Mined and sunk 29 May 1915.
- SMS S51 (1915) - "large"- or "high-seas"-torpedo boat, launched by Schichau on 29 April 1915. Scuttled at Scapa Flow on 21 June 1919.
