= SM U-8 =

German World War II submarine

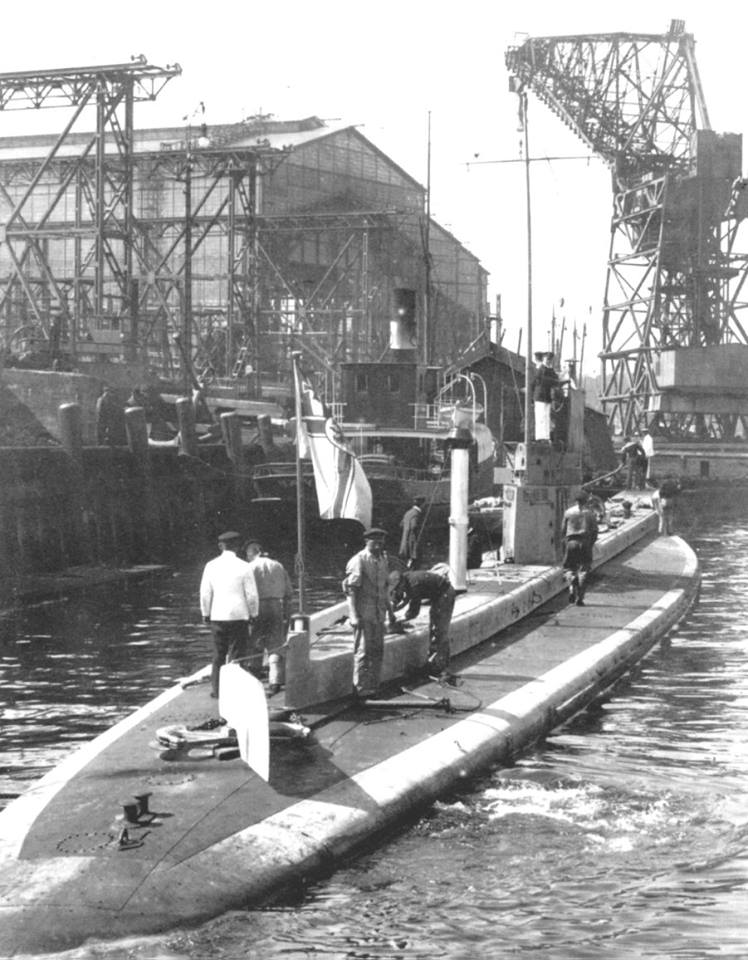
- U-8 in harbour. Note the upper rudder on the deck

History

German Empire
- Name: U-8
- Ordered: 8 April 1908
- Builder: Germaniawerft, Kiel
- Cost: 2,540,000 Goldmark
- Yard number: 150
- Laid down: 19 May 1909
- Launched: 14 March 1911
- Commissioned: 18 June 1911
- Fate: Sunk on 4 March 1915

General characteristics
- Class & type: Type U 5 submarine
- Displacement: 505 t (497 long tons) surfaced; 636 t (626 long tons) submerged
- Length: 57.30 m (188 ft) (o/a); 43.10 m (141 ft 5 in) (pressure hull)
- Beam: 5.60 m (18 ft 4 in) (o/a); 3.75 m (12 ft 4 in) (pressure hull)
- Draught: 3.55 m (11 ft 8 in)
- Propulsion: 2 shafts; 2 × Körting 6-cylinder and 2 × Körting 8-cylinder two stroke paraffin motors with 900 PS (660 kW; 890 shp); 2 × SSW electric motors with 1,040 PS (760 kW; 1,030 shp); 550 rpm surfaced; 600 rpm submerged
- Speed: 13.4 knots (24.8 km/h; 15.4 mph) surfaced; 10.2 knots (18.9 km/h; 11.7 mph) submerged
- Range: 3,300 nmi (6,100 km; 3,800 mi) at 9 knots (17 km/h; 10 mph)
- Test depth: 30 m (98 ft)
- Boats & landing craft carried: 1 dinghy
- Complement: 4 officers, 25 men
- Armament: 4 × 45 cm (17.7 in) torpedo tubes (2 each bow and stern) with 6 torpedoes; 1 × 5 cm (2.0 in) SK L/40 gun; 1 × 3.7 cm (1.5 in) Hotchkiss gun

Service record
- Part of: I Flotilla; 1 August 1914 – 4 March 1915
- Commanders: Kptlt. Konrad Gansser; 1–31 August 1914; Kptlt. Alfred Stoß; 1 September 1914 – 4 March 1915
- Operations: 1 patrol
- Victories: 5 merchant ships sunk (15,049 GRT)

SM U-8 was one of 329 U-boats which served in the Imperial German Navy during World War I.

A Type U 5 submarine, she was built at Germaniawerft in Kiel between 1909 and 1911. The boat was launched on 14 March 1911 and commissioned into the Navy on 18 June. The boat was scuttled in the English Channel in March 1915.

== Service history ==
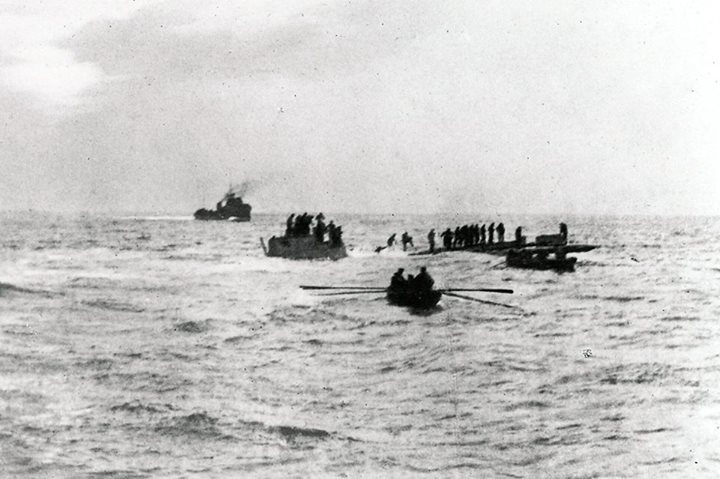
SM U-8 sinking after being scuttled on 4 March 1915

At the beginning of World War I, U-8 was commanded by Kapitänleutnant Konrad Gansser. In August 1914 she took part in the first U-boat operation of the war, sailing from Heligoland in a coordinated attack on the Royal Navy base at Scapa Flow.

Kapitänleutnant Alfred Stoß took over the boat on 1 September 1914, with Gansser moving to command U-33. During February 1915 she sank five British steamers in the English Channel. On 4 March, however, U-8 became trapped in anti-submarine nets in the Channel and was forced to surface. After coming under gunfire from HMS Gurkha and HMS Maori, the crew scuttled the boat at position 50°56′N 01°16′E. The crew were taken prisoner.

In June 2015 the submarine's propeller, which had been illegally removed from the wreck, was recovered and presented to the German Navy. It is exhibited at the Laboe Naval Memorial near Kiel. In July 2016 the wreck was officially designated as a protected site managed by Historic England.

== Summary of raiding history ==
U-8 sank five British steamers with a combined Gross Register Tonnage of 15,049 GRT.

Date	Ship name	Nationality	Tonnage (GRT)	Fate
23 February 1915	Branksome Chine	United Kingdom	2,026	Sunk
23 February 1915	Oakby	United Kingdom	1,976	Sunk
24 February 1915	Harpalion	United Kingdom	5,867	Sunk
24 February 1915	Rio Parana	United Kingdom	4,015	Sunk
24 February 1915	Western Coast	United Kingdom	1,165	Sunk
