= HMS Maori (1909) =

Destroyer of the Royal Navy

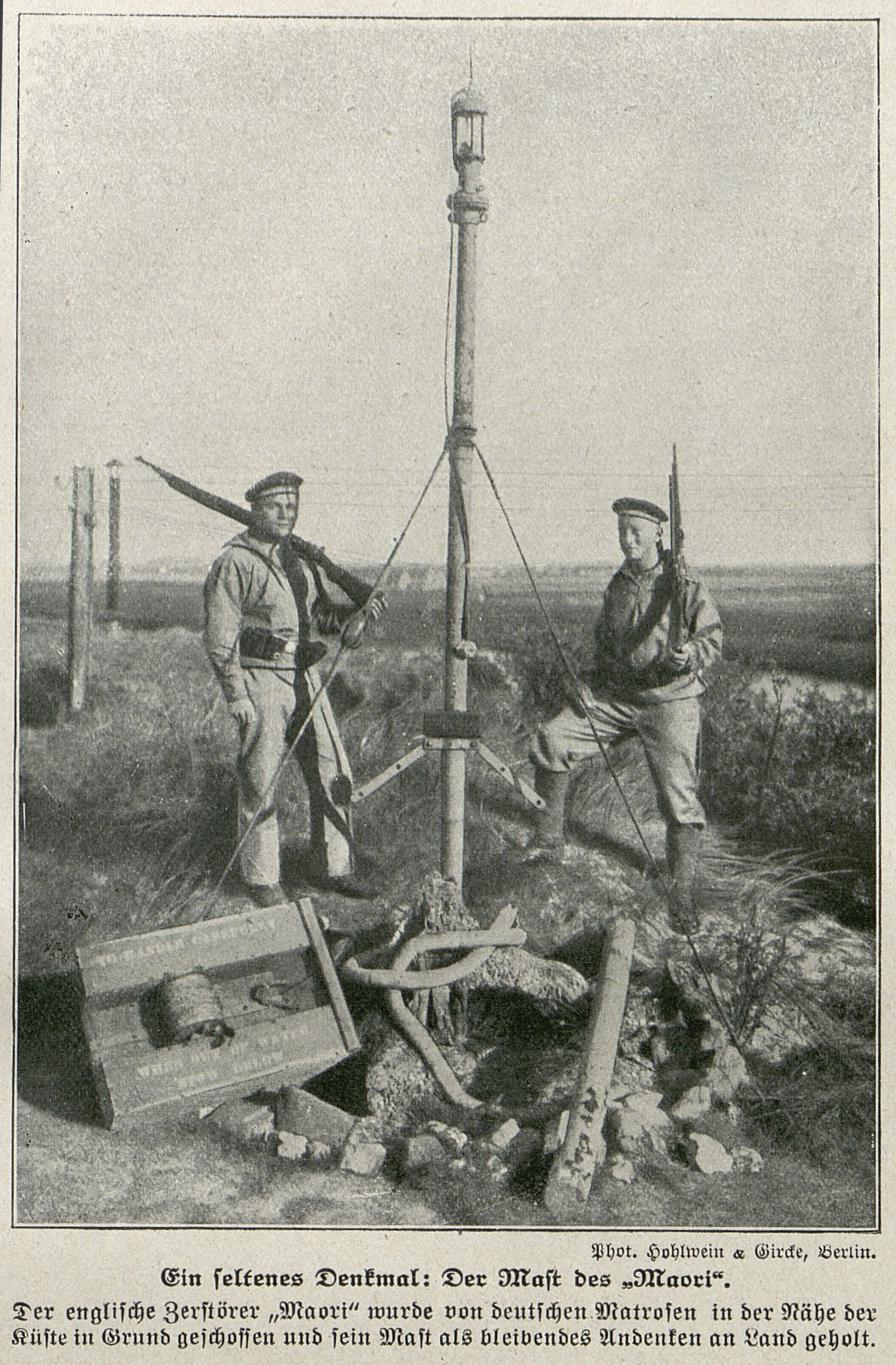
- The mast of HMS Maori as a monument in Belgium (c. 1916)

History

United Kingdom
- Name: Maori
- Namesake: Māori people
- Builder: William Denny and Brothers, Dumbarton
- Laid down: 6 August 1908
- Launched: 24 May 1909
- Completed: November 1909
- Fate: Sunk by mine, 7 May 1915

General characteristics
- Class & type: Tribal-class destroyer
- Displacement: 1,026 long tons (1,042 t)
- Length: 285 ft (86.9 m) (o/a)
- Beam: 27 ft 1 in (8.3 m)
- Draught: 8 ft 11 in (2.7 m)
- Installed power: 6 Yarrow boilers; 15,500 ihp (11,558 kW)
- Propulsion: 3 shafts, 1 steam turbine set
- Speed: 33 knots (61 km/h; 38 mph)
- Range: 1,640 nautical miles (3,040 km; 1,890 mi) at 15 knots (28 km/h; 17 mph)
- Armament: 2 × 4 in (102 mm) guns; 2 × 18 in (450 mm) torpedo tubes

HMS Maori was one of five ships of the third batch of Tribal-class destroyers built for the Royal Navy in the first decade of the twentieth century. Completed in 1909, she spent her career in British waters. During the First World War, she served in the North Sea and the English Channel with the 6th Destroyer Flotilla. She struck a mine in the North Sea on 7 May 1915 off Zeebrugge, Belgium, and sank.

== Description ==
Ordered as part of the 1907–1908 Naval Programme, the third batch of Tribal-class destroyers were improved versions of the earlier-batch ships. Maori displaced 1,026 long tons (1,042 t) at normal load and 1,150 long tons (1,170 t) at deep load. She had an overall length of 285 feet (86.9 m), a beam of 27 feet 1 inch (8.3 m) and a draught of 8 feet 11 inches (2.7 m). The ship was powered by a single steam turbine set which drove three propeller shafts using steam provided by six Yarrow boilers. The turbine was rated at 15,500 shaft horsepower (11,600 kW) and was intended to give a maximum speed of 33 knots (61 km/h; 38 mph). During her sea trials Maori reached 33.2 knots (61.5 km/h; 38.2 mph) from 26,199 shp (19,537 kW). The third-batch Tribals carried a maximum of 162 long tons (165 t) of fuel oil that gave them a range of 1,640 nautical miles (3,040 km; 1,890 mi) at 15 knots (28 km/h; 17 mph). Their crew numbered 71 officers and ratings.

The ships were armed with a pair of BL 4-inch (102 mm) Mk VIII gun in single mounts, one on the forecastle and the other on the stern. Their torpedo armament consisted of two rotating torpedo tubes for 18-inch (450 mm) torpedoes, one mount between the two forward funnels and the other on the stern.

== Construction and career ==
Maori was laid down by William Denny and Brothers at its Greenock shipyard on 6 August 1908, launched on 24 May 1909 and completed in November. On commissioning, Maori joined the 1st Destroyer Flotilla, based at Harwich, replacing the River-class destroyer Dee. By March 1913, Maori was part of the 4th Destroyer Flotilla of the First Fleet.

== Bibliography ==
- Colledge, J. J.; Warlow, Ben (2006) [1969]. Ships of the Royal Navy: The Complete Record of All Fighting Ships of the Royal Navy from the 15th Century to the Present (3rd Rev ed.). London: Chatham Publishing. ISBN 978-1-86176-281-8. OCLC 67375475.
- Dittmar, F.J.; Colledge, J. J. (1972). British Warships 1914–1919. Shepperton, UK: Ian Allan. ISBN 0-7110-0380-7.
- Friedman, Norman (2009). British Destroyers: From Earliest Days to the Second World War. Barnsley, UK: Seaforth Publishing. ISBN 978-1-84832-049-9.
- Gardiner, Robert & Gray, Randal, eds. (1985). Conway's All The World's Fighting Ships 1906–1921. London: Conway Maritime Press. ISBN 0-85177-245-5.
- Manning, T. D. (1961). The British Destroyer. London: Putnam & Co. OCLC 6470051.
- March, Edgar J. (1966). British Destroyers: A History of Development, 1892–1953; Drawn by Admiralty Permission From Official Records & Returns, Ships' Covers & Building Plans. London: Seeley Service. OCLC 164893555.
- Monograph No. 29: Home Waters—Part IV: From February to July 1915 (PDF). Naval Staff Monographs (Historical). Vol. XIII. The Naval Staff, Training and Staff Duties Division. 1925.
