= HMS Flirt (1897) =

Destroyer of the Royal Navy

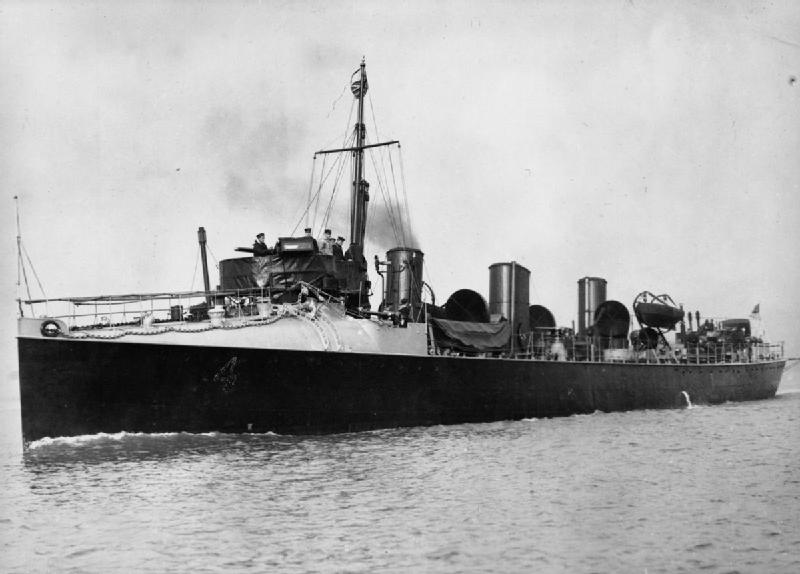
- HMS Flirt

History

United Kingdom
- Name: HMS Flirt
- Ordered: 1896 – 1897 Naval Estimates
- Builder: Palmers Shipbuilding and Iron Company Jarrow-on-Tyne
- Laid down: 5 September 1896
- Launched: 15 May 1897
- Commissioned: April 1899
- Honours and awards: Belgian Coast 1914 - 1915
- Fate: Sunk 26/27 October 1916 in combat

General characteristics
- Class & type: Palmer three funnel, 30 knot destroyer
- Displacement: 390 long tons (396 t) standard; 440 long tons (447 t) full load
- Length: 220 ft (67 m) o/a
- Beam: 20 ft 9 in (6.32 m)
- Draught: 9 ft 9 in (2.97 m)
- Installed power: 6,200 ihp (4,600 kW)
- Propulsion: 4 × Reed water tube boilers; 2 × vertical triple-expansion steam engines; 2 shafts
- Speed: 30 kn (56 km/h)
- Range: 91 tons coal
- Complement: 60 officers and men
- Armament: 1 × QF 12-pounder 12 cwt Mark I naval gun; 5 × QF 6-pdr 8 cwt naval guns on a Mark I* low angle mount; 2 × single tubes for 18-inch (450mm) torpedoes

Service record
- Operations: World War I 1914 - 1918

HMS Flirt was a Palmer three funnel, 30 knot destroyer ordered by the Royal Navy under the 1896 – 1897 Naval Estimates. She was the fifth ship to carry this name since it was introduced in 1782 for a 14-gun brig in service until 1795.

== Construction ==
The British Admiralty ordered two destroyers, Flirt and Fawn from Palmers Shipbuilding and Iron Company for the Royal Navy as part of the 1896–1897 shipbuilding programme, which included a total of 20 destroyers (17 "thirty-knotters" and three "specials" which were required to reach a higher speed). The two destroyers were repeats of the six destroyers ordered from Palmers under the 1895–1896 programme.

Flirt's hull was 220 feet (67.06 m) long overall and 215 feet (65.53 m) between perpendiculars, with a beam of 20 feet 9 inches (6.32 m) and a draught of 9 feet 9 inches (2.97 m). Four Reed water tube boilers fed steam at 250 pounds per square inch (1,700 kPa) to triple expansion steam engines rated at 6,200 indicated horsepower (4,600 kW) and driving two propeller shafts. Displacement was 390 long tons (400 t) light and 440 long tons (450 t) deep load. Three funnels were fitted, and 91 tons of coal carried. Flirt, like the other "thirty-knotters" was contractually required to maintain a speed of 30 knots (56 km/h; 35 mph) for a continuous run of three hours and over 6 consecutively measured runs of 1 mile (1.6 km) during sea trials.

Armament was specified as a single QF 12 pounder 12 cwt (3 in-calibre or 76 mm) gun on a platform on the ship's conning tower (in practice the platform was also used as the ship's bridge), backed up by five 6-pounder guns, and two 18-inch (450 mm) torpedo tubes. She had a crew of 60 to 63 officers and men.

Flirt was laid down on 5 September 1896 at the Palmers' shipyard at Jarrow-on-Tyne as Yard number 722 and launched on 15 May 1897. During sea trials she made her contracted speed requirement of 30 knots. She was completed and accepted by the Royal Navy in April 1899.

== Service history ==
=== Pre-War ===
After commissioning Flirt was assigned to the East Coast Flotilla of the 1st Fleet based at Harwich. She served in the Portsmouth instructional flotilla under the command of Commander Michael Henry Hodges until she was paid off in January 1901. On the night of 25 July 1900, Flirt was in collision with the destroyer Violet in fog, badly damaging Violet's bow, such that she had to be docked down in Pembroke Dockyard for repairs. Flirt received little damage. Commander Brian Barttelot was appointed in command on 1 August 1902. She took part in the fleet review held at Spithead on 16 August 1902 for the coronation of King Edward VII.

From August to October 1907, Flirt underwent a refit at Portsmouth Dockyard, but collided with a harbour wall on 8 October when returning to harbour after steam trials, damaging her bow. After repair she joined the Harwich destroyer flotilla.

On 30 August 1912 the Admiralty directed all destroyers were to be grouped into classes designated by letters based on contract speed and appearance. As a three-funneled destroyer with a contract speed of 30 knots, Flirt was assigned to the C Class. The class letters were painted on the hull below the bridge area and on a funnel.

=== World War I ===
For the test mobilization in July 1914 she was assigned to the 6th Destroyer Flotilla based at Dover. During her deployment there she was involved in anti-submarine, counter-mining patrols and defending the drifters of the Dover Barrage.

On 28 October 1914 Flirt took part in operations off the Belgian coast.

=== Loss ===
On the night of 26/27 October 1916 the German Navy raided the Dover Barrage with two and a half flotillas of torpedo boats and destroyers. Flirt responded to gunfire from the drifter line. She found the drifter Waveney II on fire and sent a boat to assist. When unidentified ships approached she issued a challenge and was immediately fired upon by the Germans. Flirt was lost; the only survivors were those dispatched to aid Waveney II.

She was awarded the battle honour "Belgian Coast 1914 – 15" for her service.

== Pennant numbers ==
Pennant number	From	To
P87	6 Dec 1914	1 Sep 1915
D56	1 Sep 1915	27 Oct 1916
