= Tribal-class destroyer (1905) =

1905 destroyer class of the Royal Navy

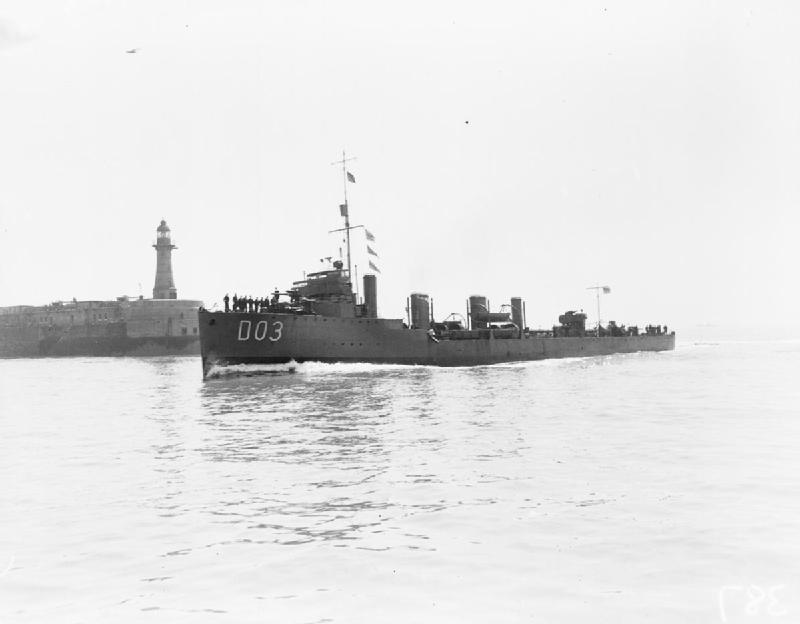
- HMS Crusader

Class overview
- Name: Tribal (or F)
- Operators: Royal Navy
- Preceded by: River class (E class)
- Succeeded by: Beagle (or G) class
- Built: 1905–1908
- In commission: 1907–1920
- Completed: 12
- Lost: 4
- Scrapped: 9

General characteristics
- Type: Destroyer
- Displacement: 860 - 940 tons
- Length: 275 ft (84 m)
- Beam: 28 ft (8.5 m)
- Draught: 8 ft 6 in (2.59 m)
- Propulsion: 2 or 3 shaft steam turbines, 12,500 shp (9,300 kW); ca.200 tons oil
- Speed: 33 knots (61 km/h; 38 mph)
- Armament: 5 × QF 12 pdr 12 cwt Mark I, mounting P Mark I; or; 2 × BL 4 in L/40 Mark VIII, mounting P Mark V; 2 × single tubes for 18-inch (450-mm) torpedoes

The Tribal or F class was a class of destroyers built for the Royal Navy. Twelve ships were built between 1905 and 1908 and all saw service during World War I, where they saw action in the North Sea and English Channel as part of the 6th Flotilla and Dover Patrols.

== Design ==
The preceding River- or E-class destroyers of 1903 had made 25.5 knots (47.2 km/h; 29.3 mph) on the 7,000 ihp (5,200 kW) provided by triple expansion steam engines and coal-fired boilers, although HMS Eden was powered by steam turbines. In November 1904, the First Sea Lord "Jackie" Fisher proposed that the next class of destroyers should make at least 33 knots (61 km/h) and should use oil-fired boilers and steam turbines as a means of achieving this. This resulted in a larger ship to provide the required doubling of installed power over their predecessors, but also pushed the design to the limits of capability of contemporary technology. As a result, the Tribals were severely compromised and a somewhat retrograde step after the successful River class; they were lightly built and proved to be fragile in service. More alarmingly however, they were only provided with 90 tons of bunkerage, and with high fuel consumption resulting from a high power output of 12,500 shp (9,300 kW), they were highly uneconomical and had a severely limited radius of action; Afridi and Amazon once used 9.5 tons of oil each simply to raise steam for a three-mile (5 km) return journey to a fuel depot.

Design details were left to the individual builders, as was Royal Navy practice at the time for destroyers. As a result, no two were alike and there was considerable heterogeneity of detail and appearance. Most noticeably the number of funnels varied from three, in Cossack and Ghurka, to six in Viking; the latter, with two single and two pairs of funnels becoming the only six-funneled destroyer ever built. With a light mainmast aft, they were the first British destroyers to have two masts.

The first five ships were designed with the armament of three QF 12-pounder guns, an improvement from the single 12-pounder and five 6-pounder guns that the River class was completed with, while the number of torpedoes remained at two 18-inch (457 mm) tubes. From the sixth ship (Saracen) onwards, however, the armament was again increased, to a pair of BL 4-inch (102 mm) guns, with one gun mounted forward and another on the quarterdeck. From October 1908, the first five ships were modified by adding another pair of 12 pounder guns.

The shift towards the larger Tribals also created a requirement for a complementary class of smaller "Coastal" destroyers giving rise to the Cricket class of small TBD, of which 36 were built between 1905 and 1908. The result of this experiment was not ideal and for the following class of destroyers (the 'G', or Beagle, class) the Admiralty reverted to a single, more uniform design for the 1908-9 programme.

== Ships ==
Seven ships to the Admiralty specification were originally envisaged, but only five vessels were ordered and built under the 1905-06 Programme, all to their builders' own designs.

Name	Builder	Laid down	Launch date	Commissioned	Fate	Image
Afridi	Armstrong Whitworth, Newcastle upon Tyne	9 August 1906	8 May 1907	7 September 1909	Sold on 9 December 1919 for breaking up	
Cossack	Cammell Laird, Birkenhead	13 November 1905	16 February 1907	12 March 1908	Sold on 12 December 1919 for breaking up	
Ghurka	Hawthorn Leslie and Company, Newcastle upon Tyne	6 February 1906	29 April 1907	17 December 1908	mined and sunk off Dungeness Buoy on 8 February 1917	
Mohawk	J Samuel White, Cowes	1 May 1906	15 March 1907	June 1908	Sold on 27 May 1919 for breaking up	
Tartar	J I Thornycroft, Woolston	13 November 1905	25 June 1907	9 April 1908	Sold on 9 May 1921 for breaking up	

Five more vessels were proposed, but only two were ordered and built under the 1906-07 Programme.

Name	Builder	Laid down	Launch date	Commissioned	Fate	Image
Amazon	J I Thornycroft, Woolston	24 June 1907	29 July 1908	April 1909	Sold on 22 October 1919 for breaking up	
Saracen	J Samuel White, Cowes	12 July 1907	31 March 1908	25 June 1909	Sold on 22 October 1919 for breaking up	

A final five vessels were ordered and built under the 1907-08 Programme.

Name	Builder	Laid down	Launch date	Commissioned	Fate	Image
Crusader	J Samuel White, Cowes	22 June 1908	20 March 1909	21 October 1909	Sold on 30 June 1920 for breaking up	
Maori	William Denny & Brothers, Dumbarton	6 August 1908	24 May 1909	11 November 1909	Mined and sunk off Wirlingen Light Ship, Zeebrugge, on 7 May 1915	
Nubian	J I Thornycroft, Woolston	18 May 1908	21 April 1909	24 August 1909	Torpedoed and damaged by German destroyers in action off Folkestone, on 27 October 1916	
Viking	Palmers, Jarrow 29 June 1910	11 June 1908	14 September 1909	29 June 1910	Sold on 12 December 1919 for breaking up	
Zulu	Hawthorn Leslie and Company, Newcastle upon Tyne	18 August 1908	16 September 1909	19 March 1910	Mined and damaged off Dover on 8 November 1916	

In October 1916, it was proposed on 8 November 1916 that the two undamaged 'ends' might be joined together, which was completed at Chatham Royal Dockyard 7 June 1917 by joining the undamaged fore section of Zulu and the rear section of Nubian respectively. The resulting destroyer was commissioned on 7 June 1917 as Zubian, which was sold for scrapping 1919.

Name	Builder	Laid down	Launch date	Commissioned	Fate	Image
Zubian	Chatham Royal Dockyard			7 June 1917	Sold on 12 December 1919 for breaking up	

== Bibliography ==
- Colledge, J. J.; Warlow, Ben (2006) [1969]. Ships of the Royal Navy: The Complete Record of All Fighting Ships of the Royal Navy from the 15th Century to the Present (3rd Rev ed.). London: Chatham Publishing. ISBN 978-1-86176-281-8. OCLC 67375475.
- Dittmar, F.J.; Colledge, J. J. (1972). British Warships 1914–1919. Shepperton, UK: Ian Allan. ISBN 0-7110-0380-7.
- Friedman, Norman (2009). British Destroyers: From Earliest Days to the Second World War. Barnsley, UK: Seaforth Publishing. ISBN 978-1-84832-049-9.
- Gardiner, Robert & Gray, Randal, eds. (1985). Conway's All The World's Fighting Ships 1906–1921. London: Conway Maritime Press. ISBN 0-85177-245-5.
- Manning, T. D. (1961). The British Destroyer. London: Putnam & Co. OCLC 6470051.
- March, Edgar J. (1966). British Destroyers: A History of Development, 1892–1953; Drawn by Admiralty Permission From Official Records & Returns, Ships' Covers & Building Plans. London: Seeley, Service. OCLC 164893555.
