= HMS Amazon (1908) =

Destroyer of the Royal Navy

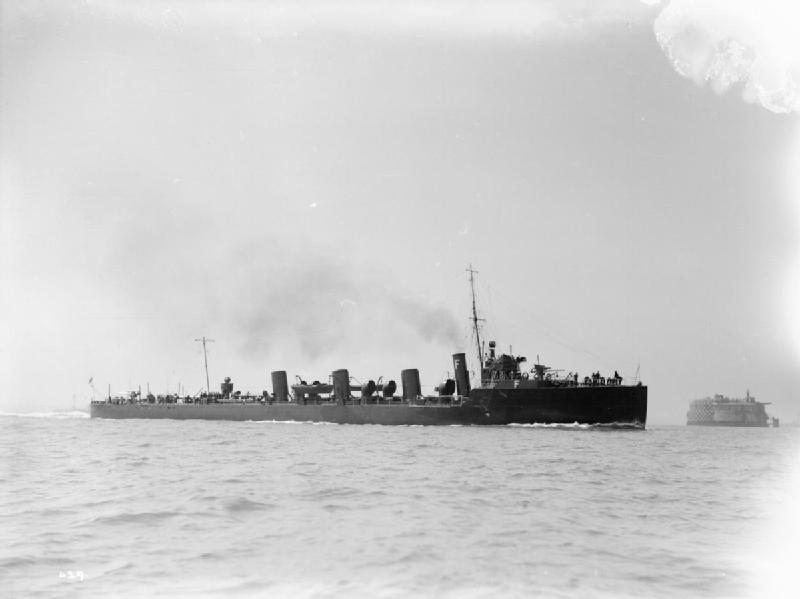
- HMS Amazon

History

United Kingdom
- Name: HMS Amazon
- Builder: J I Thornycroft, Woolston
- Laid down: 24 June 1907
- Launched: 29 July 1908
- Commissioned: 18 January 1909
- Fate: Sold for scrap on 22 October 1919

General characteristics
- Class & type: Tribal-class destroyer
- Displacement: 970 long tons (986 t)
- Length: 280 ft 4 in (85.45 m) (p/p)
- Beam: 26 ft 8 in (8.13 m)
- Draught: 10 ft (3.0 m)
- Installed power: 6 × Thornycroft boilers; about 14,000 shp (10,000 kW) (turbine)
- Propulsion: 3 shafts; 3 steam turbines
- Speed: 33 knots (61 km/h; 38 mph)
- Range: 1,400 nmi (2,600 km; 1,600 mi) at 15 knots (28 km/h; 17 mph)
- Complement: 68
- Armament: 3 × QF 12-pounder 12-cwt (Note: "Cwt" is the abbreviation for hundredweight, 12 cwt referring to the weight of the gun.) guns

HMS Amazon was a Tribal-class destroyer built for the Royal Navy in the first decade of the 20th century. She survived the First World War and was sold in 1919. During the First World War she served in the North Sea and the English Channel with the 6th Destroyer Flotilla.
