= 6th Destroyer Flotilla =

- Active: February, 1911–1939, 1947–1951
- Country: United Kingdom
- Branch: Royal Navy
- Size: Flotilla

Commanders
- First: Captain Mortimer Silver

The British 6th Destroyer Flotilla, or Sixth Destroyer Flotilla, was a military formation of the Royal Navy from 1911 to 1939 and again from 1947 to 1951

== History ==
The flotilla was formed in 1911 at Portsmouth, with its first commander, Captain Mortimer Silver, being appointed in 1912. During World War 1 it was based at Dover, forming the fighting nucleus of the Dover Patrol commanded by Rear-Admiral Reginald Bacon. From June 1915 it consisted of 11 Tribal-class destroyers, 13 other destroyers capable of 30 knots, and 4 Cricket-class destroyers along with HMS Attentive, the flagship of Captain Charles Johnson. During the course of the war the flotilla was considerably expanded, to include several monitors which bombarded the Belgian coast, including HMS Marshal Ney and Marshal Soult, and HMS Erebus and Terror.

The flotilla was disbanded in 1939. It was reformed in October 1947 as part of the Home Fleet until 1951. In 1952 it was re-designated 6th Destroyer Squadron. Its final commander was Captain Victor Danckwerts.

== Administration ==
=== Captains (D) afloat, 6th Destroyer Flotilla ===
Captain (D) afloat is a Royal Navy appointment of an operational commander of a destroyer flotilla or squadron.

== Sources ==
- Bacon, Reginald (1919). The Dover Patrol 1915–1917. (2 vols.). New York: George H. Doran Co. Vol. 1 • Vol. 2
- Harley, Simon; Lovell, Tony. (2018) "Sixth Destroyer Flotilla (Royal Navy) - The Dreadnought Project". www.dreadnoughtproject.org. Harley and Lovell.
- Whitby, Michael (2011). Commanding Canadians: The Second World War Diaries of A.F.C. Layard. Vancouver, Canada: UBC Press. ISBN 9780774840378.
- White, Michael (2015). Australian Submarines Vol 2: 2nd Edition: a History Vol 2 (in Arabic). Sydney, Australia: Australian Teachers of Media. ISBN 9781876467265.
