= SMS V44 =

History

German Empire
- Name: SMS V44
- Builder: AG Vulcan Stettin, Germany
- Launched: 24 February 1915
- Completed: 20 July 1915
- Fate: Scrapped 1922

General characteristics
- Class & type: V25-class torpedo boat
- Displacement: 1,106 t (1,089 long tons) deep load
- Length: 79.6 m (261 ft 2 in) oa
- Beam: 8.3 m (27 ft 3 in)
- Draft: 3.6 m (11 ft 10 in)
- Propulsion: 3 water tube boilers; Steam turbines, 2 Shafts; 24,000 PS (24,000 shp; 18,000 kW)
- Speed: 33.5 knots (62.0 km/h; 38.6 mph)
- Range: 2,050 nmi (3,800 km; 2,360 mi) at 17 knots (31 km/h; 20 mph)
- Complement: 87 officers and sailors
- Armament: 3 × 8.8 cm (3.5 in) SK L/45 guns; 6 × 500 mm (20 in) torpedo tubes; 24 mines

SMS V44 (Note: "SMS" stands for "Seiner Majestät Schiff" (transl. His Majesty's Ship)) (Note: The "V" in V44 denoted the shipbuilder who constructed her, in this case AG Vulcan.) was a V25-class Large Torpedo Boat (Großes Torpedoboot) of the Imperial German Navy, that served during the First World War. V44 was built by AG Vulcan at their Stettin shipyard from 1914–1915, entering service on 22 July that year. V44 took part in the Battle of Jutland in 1916, and also operated in the English Channel and the Baltic. She survived the war, and was interned at Scapa Flow, surviving the Scuttling of the German fleet at Scapa Flow. She was used as a target by the British at Portsmouth, and later scrapped in-situ in 1922, although remnants of the ship remain in Portsmouth Harbour.

== Construction ==
V44 was the second ship in the second batch of six V25-class torpedo boats (V43–V48) ordered from AG Vulcan for the Imperial German Navy on 22 April 1914, as part of the 1914 shipbuilding programme. (Note: The Imperial German Navy's practice was to split a year's orders into half-flotillas of six torpedo boats from different builders, to differing detailed design.) She was launched as Yard number 359 on 24 February 1915 and completed on 20 July 1915.

V44 was 79.6 metres (261 ft 2 in) long overall and 78.8 metres (258 ft 6 in) between perpendiculars, with a beam of 8.3 metres (27 ft 3 in) and a draft of 3.6 metres (11 ft 10 in). Displacement was 952 tonnes (937 long tons) normal and 1,106 tonnes (1,089 long tons) deep load. Three oil-fired water-tube boilers fed steam to 2 sets of AEG-Vulcan steam turbines rated at 24,000 metric horsepower (24,000 shp; 18,000 kW), giving a speed of 33.5 knots (62.0 km/h; 38.6 mph). 338 tonnes (333 long tons) of fuel oil was carried, giving a range of 2,050 nautical miles (3,800 km; 2,360 mi) at 17 knots (31 km/h; 20 mph).

Armament originally consisted of three 8.8 cm SK L/45 naval guns in single mounts, together with six 50 cm (19.7 in) torpedo tubes with two fixed single tubes forward and 2 twin mounts aft. Up to 24 mines could be carried. The ship had a complement of 87 officers and men.

== Service ==
On 24 April 1916, the German battlecruisers of I Scouting Group and the light cruisers of the II Scouting Group set out from Kiel on a mission to bombard the British East-coast towns of Yarmouth and Lowestoft, with the torpedo boats of the 6th and 9th Torpedo Boat Flotillas as escorts, and V44 as part of the 6th Flotilla. The battleships of the High Seas Fleet were deployed in support, with the hope of destroying isolated elements of the British Forces if they tried to intercept. There was a brief engagement between the German forces and the light cruisers and destroyers of the Harwich Force, which caused the German battlecruisers to break off the bombardment of Lowestoft, but rather than take the chance to destroy the outnumbered British force, the Germans chose to retire.

V44 took part at the Battle of Jutland on 31 May–1 June 1916, as leader of the 11th Half Flotilla of the 6th Torpedo Boat Flotilla, and again in support of the German Battlecruisers. V44, together with G41, G86 and G87 carried out a torpedo attack on British battlecruisers during the "Run to the South". In total, seven torpedoes were launched, two from V44, none of which hit their targets. Later during the day, these four torpedo boats, together with the cruiser Regensburg and several other torpedo boats, engaged British destroyers supporting the 3rd Battlecruiser Squadron. The British destroyer Shark was badly damaged during this engagement. From about 20:15 CET (19:15 GMT), V44 took part in a large-scale torpedo attack on the British fleet in order to cover the outnumber German battleship's turn to west. V44 launched three torpedoes, which as with all the torpedoes launched in this attack, missed. While V44 was unharmed in this attack, several torpedo boats were damaged by heavy British fire, (Note: G41, G86, G87, V28, S51 and S52 were all damaged in this attack.) and S35 was sunk. V44 was part of the 7th Torpedo Boat Flotilla during the inconclusive Action of 19 August 1916, when the German High Seas Fleet sailed to cover a sortie of the battlecruisers of the 1st Scouting Group.

On 22 January 1917, 11 torpedo boats of the 6th Torpedo Boat Flotilla, including V44, (Note: V69, G37, G41, V43, V44, V45, V46, S49, S50, G86 and G87.) left Helgoland to reinforce the German torpedo forces in Flanders. The British Admiralty knew about this transfer due to codebreaking by Room 40, and ordered the Harwich Force of cruisers and destroyers to intercept the German torpedo boats. he British set six light cruisers, two flotilla leaders and sixteen destroyers to intercept the eleven German ships, deploying them in several groups to make sure that all possible routes were covered. During the night of 22–23 January, the 6th Flotilla encountered three British light cruisers (Aurora, Conquest and Centaur). G41 and V69 were both badly damaged by British fire and collision, but managed to break contact with the British ships, while the rest of the Flotilla escaped unharmed and continued on its way. S50 lost contact with the remainder of the Flotilla, and encountered a group of British destroyers, sinking Simoom. The 6th Flotilla carried out unsuccessful sorties into the Channel on 25 January and against a convoy between Britain and the Netherlands on 29 January before the Flanders forces were further reinforced on 18 February.

On the night of 25/26 February, the Germans launched another major raid on the Channel. Six torpedo boats of the 6th Flotilla, including V44, (Note: S49, G37, V44, V45, V46 and G86) were to attack the Dover Barrage, while five more torpedo boats were to attack shipping in the vicinity of the Downs, and three more operating against the shipping routes between Britain and the Netherlands. The torpedo boats of the 6th Flotilla encountered the British destroyer Laverock and attacked with heavy gunfire and torpedoes (one of which hit the British destroyer but failed to explode), but Laverock only received light damage, and the 6th Flotilla turned back for Zeebrugge, with the drifters of the Dover Barrage unharmed. The attack on the Downs found no shipping and ended up in a brief shore bombardment that killed three civilians. V44 did not take part in the Flanders-based forces attack on the Channel on March 17/18, but on the night of 22/23 March took part in a raid on the shipping route between Britain and the Netherlands during which the Dutch cargo ship Amstelstroom was sunk. On 29 March 1917, the 6th Flotilla returned to Germany.

In October 1917, Germany launched Operation Albion, an invasion of islands in the West Estonian archipelago to secure the left flank of the German Army following the German capture of Riga. The Germans assembled a powerful naval force to support the operation, reinforced by forces detached from the High Seas Fleet, including the 6th Torpedo Boat Flotilla and V44. V44 returned to the North Sea in November 1917, and on 17 November 1917 took part in the Second Battle of Heligoland Bight as part of the 12th Half flotilla.

== Fate ==
After the end of hostilities, V44 was interned at Scapa Flow in accordance with the terms of the Armistice of 11 November 1918. On 21 June 1919, the German fleet interned at Scapa scuttled itself, but British forces managed to beach several of the ships before they could sink, including V44, which was beached on the south side of Fara. The Treaty of Versailles allocated a battleship, a cruiser and three torpedo boats to Britain as "Propaganda ships", which could be used for a short period of time for experimental purposes or as targets. V44 was one of these ships. On 8 December 1920, V44 was used as a target by the monitor Terror in order to test the effectiveness of new weapons and shells. V44 was hit by four 6-inch (152 mm), two 4.7-inch (120 mm) and eight 4-inch (102 mm) shells, which caused heavy flooding, and V44 was towed to Portsmouth harbour and beached (near the torpedo boat V82, used as a target by Terror on 13 October that year) to avoid sinking. V44 was sold for scrap to TW Ward on 30 March 1921, but they took little action to break up the ship, and V44 (along with V82) was sold again, to the shipbreaking yard Pounds, in 1927. The two ships were partly broken up in-situ during the late 1920s and early 1930s, with the remains of the ships left in the mud banks. The remnants of the two ships remain visible at low tide in 2019.

== Sources ==
- Campbell, John (1998). Jutland: An Analysis of the Fighting. London: Conway Maritime Press. ISBN 0-85177-750-3.
- Dodson, Aidan (2019). "Beyond the Kaiser: The IGN's Destroyers and Torpedo Boats After 1918". In Jordan, John (ed.). Warship 2019. Oxford, UK: Osprey Publishing. pp. 129–144. ISBN 978-1-4728-3595-6.
- Fisher, Stephen; Whitewright, Julian (2017). "Warship Notes: Hidden Heritage: The German Torpedo Boats in Portsmouth Harbour". In Jordan, John (ed.). Warship 2017. London: Conway. ISBN 978-1-8448-6472-0.
- Fock, Harald (1989). Z-Vor! Internationale Entwicklung und Kriegseinsätze von Zerstörern und Torpedobooten 1914 bis 1939 (in German). Herford, Germany: Koehlers Verlagsgesellschaft mBH. ISBN 3-7822-0207-4.
- "Forgotten Wrecks of the First World War: V44 & V82 site report" (PDF). Maritime Archaeology Trust. February 2016.
- Gagen, Ernst von (1964). Der Krieg in der Ostsee: Dritter Band: Von Anfang 1916 bis zum kriegsende. Der Krieg zur See: 1914–1918 (in German). Frankfurt, Germany: Verlag von E. S. Mittler und Sohn.
- Gardiner, Robert; Gray, Randal, eds. (1985). Conway's All The World's Fighting Ships 1906–1921. London: Conway Maritime Press. ISBN 0-85177-245-5.
- Gröner, Erich; Jung, Dieter; Maass, Martin (1983). Die deutschen Kriegsschiffe 1815–1945: Band 2: Torpedoboote, Zerstörer, Schnellboote, Minensuchboote, Minenräumboote (in German). Koblenz: Bernard & Graef Verlag. ISBN 3-7637-4801-6.
- Halpern, Paul G. (1994). A Naval History of World War I. London: UCL Press. ISBN 1-85728-498-4.
- Karau, Mark D. (2014). The Naval Flank of the Western Front: The German MarineKorps Flandern 1914–1918. Barnsley, UK: Seaforth Publishing. ISBN 978-1-84832-231-8.
- Massie, Robert K. (2007). Castles of Steel: Britain, Germany and the Winning of the Great War at Sea. London: Vintage Books. ISBN 978-0-099-52378-9.
- Monograph No. 32: Lowestoft Raid: 24th – 25th April, 1916 (PDF). Naval Staff Monographs (Historical). Vol. XVI. The Naval Staff, Training and Staff Duties Division. 1927.
- Monograph No. 33: Home Waters Part VII: From June 1916 to November 1916 (PDF). Naval Staff Monographs (Historical). Vol. XVII. Naval Staff, Training and Staff Duties Division. 1927.
- Monograph No. 34: Home Waters—Part VIII: December 1916 to April 1917 (PDF). Naval Staff Monographs (Historical). Vol. XVIII. The Naval Staff, Training and Staff Duties Division. 1933.
- Newbolt, Henry (1928). Naval Operations: Volume IV. History of the Great War: Based on Official Documents. London: Longmans Green & Co.
