= SMS V43 =

V25-class Large Torpedo Boat of the Imperial German Navy

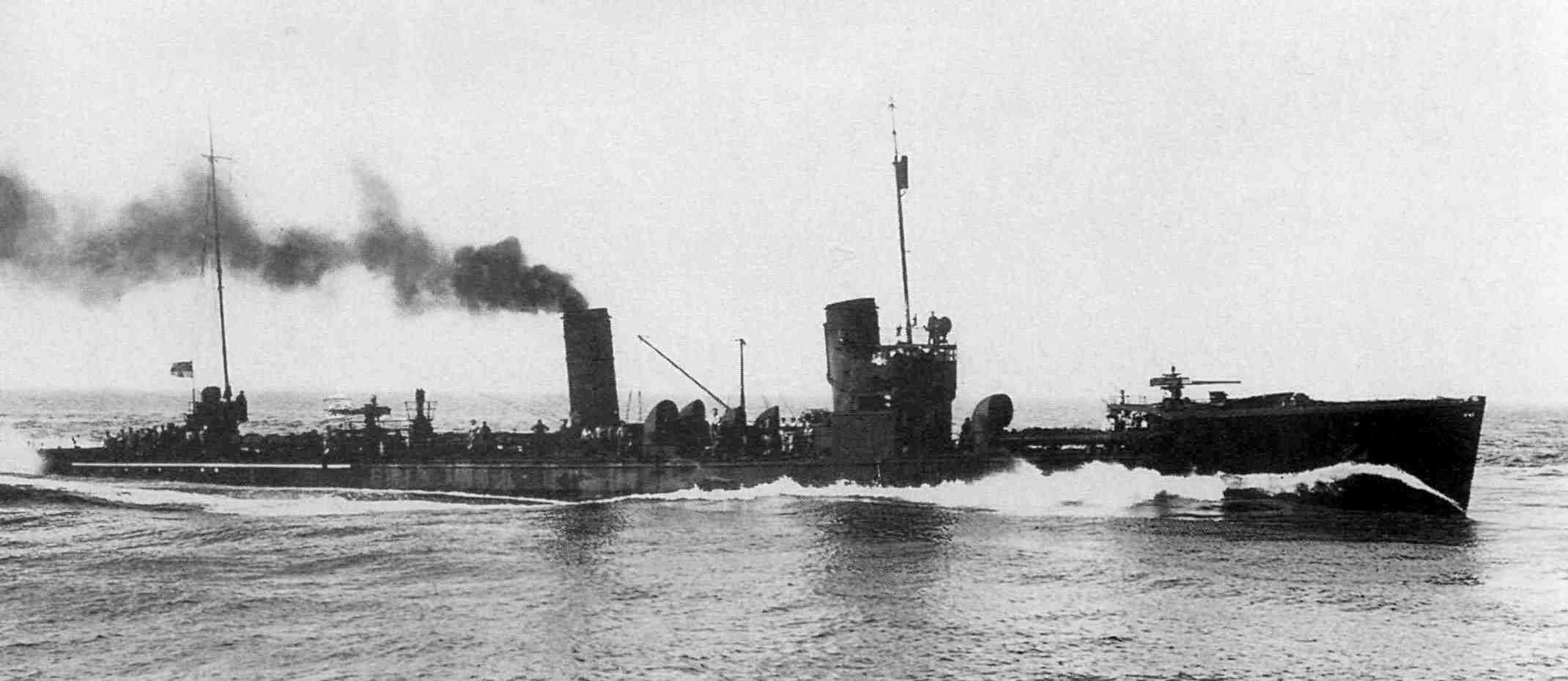

History

German Empire
- Name: SMS V43
- Builder: AG Vulcan Stettin, Germany
- Launched: 27 January 1915
- Completed: 28 May 1915
- Fate: Sank as target 15 July 1921

General characteristics
- Class & type: V25-class torpedo boat
- Displacement: 1,106 t (1,089 long tons) deep load
- Length: 79.6 m (261 ft 2 in) oa
- Beam: 8.3 m (27 ft 3 in)
- Draft: 3.6 m (11 ft 10 in)
- Propulsion: 3 water tube boilers; Steam turbines, 2 Shafts; 24,000 PS (24,000 shp; 18,000 kW)
- Speed: 33.5 knots (62.0 km/h; 38.6 mph)
- Range: 2,050 nmi (3,800 km; 2,360 mi) at 17 knots (31 km/h; 20 mph)
- Complement: 87 officers and sailors
- Armament: 3 × 8.8 cm (3.5 in) SK L/45 guns; 6 × 500 mm (20 in) torpedo tubes; 24 mines

SMS V43 (Note: "SMS" stands for "Seiner Majestät Schiff" (transl. His Majesty's Ship)) (Note: The "V" in V43 denoted the shipbuilder who constructed her, in this case AG Vulcan.) was a V25-class Large Torpedo Boat (Großes Torpedoboot) of the Imperial German Navy, that served during the First World War. V43 was built by AG Vulcan at their Stettin shipyard from 1914–1915, entering service on 28 May that year. V43 took part in operations in the North Sea, the English Channel and the Baltic Sea. She survived the war, and was interned at Scapa Flow, surviving the Scuttling of the German fleet at Scapa Flow. V43 was allocated to the US Navy, and was sunk as a target on 15 July 1921.

== Construction ==
V43 was the first ship in the second batch of six V25-class torpedo boats (V43–V48) ordered from AG Vulcan for the Imperial German Navy on 22 April 1914, as part of the 1914 shipbuilding programme. (Note: The Imperial German Navy's practice was to split a year's orders into half-flotillas of six torpedo boats from different builders, to differing detailed design.) She was launched as Yard number 358 on 27 January 1915 and completed on 20 July 1915.

V44 was 79.6 metres (261 ft 2 in) long overall and 78.8 metres (258 ft 6 in) between perpendiculars, with a beam of 8.3 metres (27 ft 3 in) and a draft of 3.6 metres (11 ft 10 in). Displacement was 952 tonnes (937 long tons) normal and 1,106 tonnes (1,089 long tons) deep load. Three oil-fired water-tube boilers fed steam to 2 sets of AEG-Vulcan steam turbines rated at 24,000 metric horsepower (24,000 shp; 18,000 kW), giving a speed of 33.5 knots (62.0 km/h; 38.6 mph). 338 tonnes (333 long tons) of fuel oil was carried, giving a range of 2,050 nautical miles (3,800 km; 2,360 mi) at 17 knots (31 km/h; 20 mph).

Armament originally consisted of three 8.8 cm SK L/45 naval guns in single mounts, together with six 50 cm (19.7 in) torpedo tubes with two fixed single tubes forward and 2 twin mounts aft. Up to 24 mines could be carried. The ship had a complement of 87 officers and men.

== Service ==
At the end of January 1916, V43 was part of the 6th Torpedo-boat Flotilla. On 10 February 1916, V43 took part in a sortie by 25 torpedo boats of the 2nd, 6th and 9th Torpedo-boat Flotillas into the North Sea. The sortie led to an encounter between several German torpedo boats and British minesweepers off the Dogger Bank, which resulted in the British minesweeper Arabis being torpedoed and sunk by ships of the 2nd Flotilla. On 25 March 1916, the British seaplane carrier Vindex, escorted by the light cruisers and destroyers of the Harwich Force, launched an air raid against an airship base believed to be at Hoyer on the coast of Schleswig. The raid was unsuccessful, with the destroyer Medusa being badly damaged in a collision (and later having to be scuttled) and German forces, including the 6th Torpedo-boat Flotilla with V43, sortied in response. Poor weather forced the German torpedo boats to turn back, but the torpedo boats G193 and G194 encountered British cruisers, with G194 being rammed by the British cruiser Cleopatra and sunk, before the cruiser Undaunted collided with Cleopatra.

On 24 April 1916, the German battlecruisers of I Scouting Group and the light cruisers of the II Scouting Group set out from Kiel on a mission to bombard the British East-coast towns of Yarmouth and Lowestoft, with the torpedo boats of the 6th and 9th Torpedo Boat Flotillas as escorts, and V43 as part of the 6th Flotilla. The battleships of the High Seas Fleet were deployed in support, with the hope of destroying isolated elements of the British Forces if they tried to intercept. There was a brief engagement between the German forces and the light cruisers and destroyers of the Harwich Force, which caused the German battlecruisers to break off the bombardment of Lowestoft, but rather than take the change to destroy the outnumbered British force, the Germans chose to retire. V43 did not sail with the rest of the 6th Torpedo-boat Flotilla when it left Kiel on 31 May 1916, and so missed the Battle of Jutland. V44 was part of the 7th Torpedo Boat Flotilla during the inconclusive Action of 19 August 1916, when the German High Seas Fleet sailed to cover a sortie of the battlecruisers of the 1st Scouting Group.

On 22 January 1917, 11 torpedo boats of the 6th Torpedo Boat Flotilla, including V43, (Note: V69, G37, G41, V43, V44, V45, V46, S49, S50, G86 and G87.) left Helgoland to reinforce the German torpedo forces in Flanders. The British Admiralty knew about this transfer due to codebreaking by Room 40, and ordered the Harwich Force of cruisers and destroyers to intercept the German torpedo boats. he British set six light cruisers, two flotilla leaders and sixteen destroyers to intercept the eleven German ships, deploying them in several groups to make sure that all possible routes were covered. During the night of 22–23 January, the 6th Flotilla encountered three British light cruisers (Aurora, Conquest and Centaur). G41 and V69 were both badly damaged by British fire and collision, but managed to break contact with the British ships, while the rest of the Flotilla escaped unharmed and continued on its way. S50 lost contact with the remainder of the Flotilla, and encountered a group of British destroyers, sinking Simoom. The 6th Flotilla carried out unsuccessful sorties into the Channel on 25 January and against a convoy between Britain and the Netherlands on 29 January before the Flanders forces were further reinforced on 18 February.

The Flanders-based flotillas launched a major attack on the Dover Barrage and shipping in the Channel on the night of 17/18 March. Seven torpedo boats of the 6th Flotilla, including V43 (Note: Leader: S49, 11th Half Flotilla:G86, G87, 12th Half Flotilla: G37, V43, V45 and V46.) were to attack the Dover Barrage north of the Sandettie Bank, with five torpedo boats of the 1st Zeebrugge Half-Flotilla attacking south of the Sandettie Bank, and four ships of the 2nd Zeebrugge Half-Flotilla operating against the Downs. The 6th Flotilla met the British destroyer Paragon on crossing the Dover Barrage. Paragon challenged the German torpedo boats, which replied with gunfire and torpedoes, Paragon being struck by torpedoes from S49 and G46 and sunk. The 12th Half-Flotilla (including V43) became separated from the rest of the 6th Flotilla in this action, and therefore returned to base, while the remaining three ships of the flotilla continued on, torpedoing and badly damaging the destroyer Llewellen before returning to base, while a merchant ship was sunk by the 2nd Zeebrugge Half-Flotilla east of the Downs. The 6th Flotilla returned to Germany on 29 March 1917.

In October 1917, Germany launched Operation Albion, an invasion of islands in the West Estonian archipelago to secure the left flank of the German Army following the German capture of Riga. The Germans assembled a powerful naval force to support the operation, reinforced by forces detached from the High Seas Fleet, including the 6th Torpedo Boat Flotilla and V44. On 17 November 1917, V43 was part of the covering force for minesweeping operations in the Heligoland Bight, when a British force, including the large cruisers Courageous and Glorious, eight light cruisers and ten destroyers attacked. In the resulting Second Battle of Heligoland Bight, the Germans evaded the British until the appearance of the battleships of the German High Seas Fleet caused the British to break off the action. Only a single German trawler was sunk.

== Fate ==
After the end of hostilities, V43 was interned at Scapa Flow in accordance with the terms of the Armistice of 11 November 1918. On 21 June 1919, the German fleet interned at Scapa scuttled itself, but British forces managed to beach several of the ships before they could sink, including V43. The Treaty of Versailles allocated a battleship, a cruiser and three torpedo boats to the United States as "Propaganda ships", which could be used for a short period of time for experimental purposes or as targets. V43 was one of these ships. V43 turned over to the United States and commissioned on 4 June 1920 for passage across the Atlantic, before being decommissioned at Norfolk, Virginia on 30 August 1920. She was sunk as a target off Cape Henry by the American battleship Florida on 15 July 1921.

== Sources ==
- Campbell, John (1998). Jutland: An Analysis of the Fighting. London: Conway Maritime Press. ISBN 0-85177-750-3.
- Dodson, Aidan (2019). "Beyond the Kaiser: The IGN's Destroyers and Torpedo Boats After 1918". In Jordan, John (ed.). Warship 2019. Oxford, UK: Osprey Publishing. pp. 129–144. ISBN 978-1-4728-3595-6.
- Fock, Harald (1989). Z-Vor! Internationale Entwicklung und Kriegseinsätze von Zerstörern und Torpedobooten 1914 bis 1939 (in German). Herford, Germany: Koehlers Verlagsgesellschaft mBH. ISBN 3-7822-0207-4.
- Gagen, Ernst von (1964). Der Krieg in der Ostsee: Dritter Band: Von Anfang 1916 bis zum kriegsende. Der Krieg zur See: 1914–1918 (in German). Frankfurt, Germany: Verlag von E. S. Mittler und Sohn.
- Gardiner, Robert; Gray, Randal, eds. (1985). Conway's All The World's Fighting Ships 1906–1921. London: Conway Maritime Press. ISBN 0-85177-245-5.
- Gröner, Erich; Jung, Dieter; Maass, Martin (1983). Die deutschen Kriegsschiffe 1815–1945: Band 2: Torpedoboote, Zerstörer, Schnellboote, Minensuchboote, Minenräumboote (in German). Koblenz: Bernard & Graef Verlag. ISBN 3-7637-4801-6.
- Halpern, Paul G. (1994). A Naval History of World War I. London: UCL Press. ISBN 1-85728-498-4.
- Karau, Mark D. (2014). The Naval Flank of the Western Front: The German MarineKorps Flandern 1914–1918. Barnsley, UK: Seaforth Publishing. ISBN 978-1-84832-231-8.
- Massie, Robert K. (2007). Castles of Steel: Britain, Germany and the Winning of the Great War at Sea. London: Vintage Books. ISBN 978-0-099-52378-9.
- Monograph No. 31: Home Waters Part VI: From October 1915 to May 1916 (PDF). Naval Staff Monographs (Historical). Vol. XV. Naval Staff, Training and Staff Duties Division. 1926.
- Monograph No. 32: Lowestoft Raid: 24th – 25th April, 1916 (PDF). Naval Staff Monographs (Historical). Vol. XVI. The Naval Staff, Training and Staff Duties Division. 1927.
- Monograph No. 33: Home Waters Part VII: From June 1916 to November 1916 (PDF). Naval Staff Monographs (Historical). Vol. XVII. Naval Staff, Training and Staff Duties Division. 1927.
- Monograph No. 34: Home Waters—Part VIII: December 1916 to April 1917 (PDF). Naval Staff Monographs (Historical). Vol. XVIII. The Naval Staff, Training and Staff Duties Division. 1933.
- Newbolt, Henry (1928). Naval Operations: Volume IV. History of the Great War: Based on Official Documents. London: Longmans Green & Co.
- Newbolt, Henry (1931). Naval Operations: Vol. V. History of the Great War: Based on Official Documents. London: Longmans Green. OCLC 220475309.
- Ruge, F. (1972). Warship Profile 27: SM Torpedo Boat B110. Profile Publications.
