= SMS V46 =

Large Torpedo Boat of the Imperial German Navy

History

German Empire
- Ordered: 1914 Peacetime order
- Builder: AG Vulcan Stettin, Germany
- Launched: 23 December 1914
- Commissioned: 31 October 1915
- Fate: Interned at Scapa Flow 22 November 1918; Transferred to France in 1920; Scrapped in 1924

General characteristics
- Class & type: V25-class torpedo boat
- Displacement: 1,106 t (1,089 long tons)
- Length: 79.6 m (261 ft 2 in)
- Beam: 8.32 m (27 ft 4 in)
- Draft: 3.61 m (11 ft 10 in)
- Propulsion: 3× water-tube boilers; 2× steam turbines; 24,000 metric horsepower (24,000 shp; 18,000 kW)
- Speed: 34.5 knots (63.9 km/h; 39.7 mph)
- Range: 1,270 nmi (2,350 km; 1,460 mi)at 20 knots (37 km/h; 23 mph)
- Complement: 88 officers and sailors
- Armament: 3 × 8.8 cm (3.5 in) SK L/45 guns; 6 × 500 mm torpedo tubes; 24 mines

SMS V46 was a 1913 type large torpedo boat (Großes Torpedoboot) of the Imperial German Navy during World War I. She was built by AG Vulcan at their Stettin shipyard, being launched on 23 December 1914 and completing in October 1915.

V46 was part of the German High Seas Fleet during the war, and took part in the Battle of Jutland on 31 May 1916. In 1917, she, along with the rest of her flotilla, was deployed to Flanders, taking part in raids against allied shipping and the Dover Barrage, before returning the Germany. In October 1917, V46 took part in Operation Albion, the German landings on the West Estonian archipelago. V46 was interned at Scapa Flow after the end on the fighting, and after attempts to scuttle her on 21 June 1919 failed, was transferred to France in 1920 and scrapped in 1924.

== Construction ==
Ordered from AG Vulcan on 22 April 1914 as part of the 1914 construction programme of high-seas torpedo-boats (with a half-flotilla of 6 ordered from Germaniawerft and a second half-flotilla from Vulcan), she was launched from AG Vulcan's Stettin, (now Szczecin in Poland) on 23 December 1914 and commissioned on 31 October 1915. The "V" in V46 denoted the shipbuilder who constructed her.

V46 was 79.6 metres (261 ft 2 in) long overall and 78.8 metres (258 ft 6 in) at the waterline, with a beam of 8.32 metres (27 ft 4 in) and a draught of 3.61 metres (11 ft 10 in). Displacement was 852 tonnes (839 long tons) normal and 1,106 tonnes (1,089 long tons) deep load. Three oil-fired water-tube boilers fed steam to 2 sets of AEG-Vulcan steam turbines rated at 24,000 metric horsepower (24,000 shp; 18,000 kW), driving two propeller shafts via Föttinger hydraulic couplings giving a speed of 34.5 knots (63.9 km/h; 39.7 mph). 296 tonnes (291 long tons) of fuel oil was carried, giving a range of 1,750 nautical miles (3,240 km; 2,010 mi) at 17 knots (31 km/h; 20 mph) and 1,270 nautical miles (2,350 km; 1,460 mi) at 20 knots (37 km/h; 23 mph).

Armament originally consisted of three 8.8 cm SK L/45 naval guns in single mounts, together with six 50 cm (19.7 in) torpedo tubes with two fixed single tubes forward and 2 twin mounts aft. Up to 24 mines could be carried. The ship had a complement of 87 officers and men.

== Service ==
V46 was assigned to the Sixth Torpedo Boat Flotilla, Twelfth Half-Flotilla, of the High Seas Fleet of the Imperial German Navy when she participated in the Battle of Jutland. The 12th Half Flotilla attempted a torpedo attack against the battlecruisers of the British 3rd Battlecruiser Squadron at about 19:00 CET (i.e. 18:00 GMT), but while V69 fired two torpedoes and S50 and V45 both fired a single torpedo, V46 did not fire any torpedoes in this engagement, as she was avoiding two torpedoes from the British destroyer Shark and one from S50 which was running in circles. None of the torpedoes from this attack, or one immediately afterwards from the 9th Flotilla, hit their targets. Later that evening, the 12th Half Flotilla was sent to the rear of the retiring German fleet, in order to carry out night torpedo attacks on the British fleet. They were fired on by the 2nd Light Cruiser Squadron at about 21:52 CET and turned away, with S50 being damaged by a British shell. V46 and V69 later returned to their search for the British battleships, but although they spotted flashes of the night battles, they encountered no British ships.

In January 1917, the 6th Flotilla was transferred to Flanders to reinforce the German torpedo boat forces based in the Belgian ports. The Flotilla set out from Helgoland for Flanders on 22 January, but decoding of German radio signals by Room 40 warned the British of the German intentions, and the Harwich Force of cruisers and destroyers sent to intercept the German torpedo boats. During the night of 22–23 January, the 6th Flotilla encountered three British light cruisers (Aurora, Conquest and Centaur). In a confused engagement, V69 was hit by a shell and collided with G41, with both badly damaged, although both survived the encounter, while S50 lost contact with the remainder of the flotilla and, after an encounter with a separate group of British destroyers in which Simoom was sunk, returned to Germany. The remaining eight ships of the flotilla reached Zeebrugge unharmed on 23 January. On the night of 25/26 February, the Flanders-based torpedo boats launched a three-pronged attack against Allied shipping in the English Channel and the Dover Barrage. Six ships of the 6th Flotilla, including V46 were to attack the Dover Barrage, while other torpedo boats were to attack shipping on The Downs and off the mouth of the River Maas. The 6th Flotilla ran into the British destroyer Laverock which was patrolling the Barrage. While the German ships attacked Laverock with heavy gunfire and torpedoes (one of which hit the British destroyer but failed to explode), the British destroyer only received light damage, and the 6th Flotilla turned back for Zeebrugge, with the drifters of the Dover Barrage unharmed. The Flanders-based flotillas attacked again on the night of 17/18 March. Seven torpedo boats of the 6th Flotilla (S49, G86, G87, G37, V43, V45 and V46) were to attack the Dover Barrage north of the Sandettie Bank, with five torpedo boats of the 1st Zeebrugge Half-Flotilla attacking south of the Sandettie Bank, and four ships of the 2nd Zeebrugge Half-Flotilla operating against the Downs. The 6th Flotilla met the British destroyer Paragon on crossing the Dover Barrage. Paragon challenged the German torpedo boats, which replied with gunfire and torpedoes, Paragon being struck by torpedoes from S49 and G46 and sunk. The 12th Half-Flotilla (including V46) became separated from the rest of the 6th Flotilla and therefore returned to base, while the remaining three ships of the flotilla continued on, torpedoing and badly damaging the destroyer Llewellyn before returning to base, while a merchant ship was sunk by the 2nd Zeebrugge Half-Flotilla east of the Downs. The 6th Flotilla returned to Germany on 29 March 1917.

In October 1917, Germany launched Operation Albion, an invasion of islands in the West Estonian archipelago to secure the left flank of the German Army following the German capture of Riga. The Germans assembled a powerful naval force to support the operation, reinforced by forces detached from the High Seas Fleet, including the 6th Torpedo Boat Flotilla. V46 carried out operations in Tagga Bay in support of Operation Albion on 14 October.

After the end of hostilities, V46 was interned at Scapa Flow. Attempts to scuttle her with the rest of the German fleet were unsuccessful. She was handed over to France in 1920 as a short term trials ship and was scrapped in 1924.

== See also ==
- German ocean-going torpedo boats of World War I

== Bibliography ==
- Campbell, John (1998). Jutland: An Analysis of the Fighting. London: Conway Maritime Press. ISBN 0-85177-750-3.
- Dodson, Aidan (2019). "Beyond the Kaiser: The IGN's Destroyers and Torpedo Boats After 1918". In Jordan, John (ed.). Warship 2019. Oxford, UK: Osprey Publishing. pp. 129–144. ISBN 978-1-4728-3595-6.
- Fock, Harald (1989). Z-Vor! Internationale Entwicklung und Kriegseinsätze von Zerstörern und Torpedobooten 1914 bis 1939 (in German). Herford, Germany: Koehlers Verlagsgesellschaft mBH. ISBN 3-7822-0207-4.
- Gagen, Ernst von (1964). Der Krieg in der Ostsee: Dritter Band: Von Anfang 1916 bis zum kriegsende. Der Krieg zur See: 1914–1918 (in German). Frankfurt, Germany: Verlag von E. S. Mittler und Sohn.
- Gardiner, Robert; Gray, Randal, eds. (1985). Conway's All The World's Fighting Ships 1906–1921. London: Conway Maritime Press. ISBN 0-85177-245-5.
- Gröner, Erich (1983). Die deutschen Kriegsschiffe 1815–1945: Band 2: Torpedoboote, Zerstörer, Schnelleboote, Minensuchboote, Minenräumboote. Koblenz, Germany: Bernard & Graefe Verlag. ISBN 3-7637-4801-6.
- Halpern, Paul G. (1994). A Naval History of World War I. London: UCL Press. ISBN 1-85728-498-4.
- Karau, Mark K. (2014). The Naval Flank of the Western Front: The German MarineKorps Flandern 1914–1918. Barnsley, UK: Seaforth Publishing. ISBN 978-1-84832-231-8.
- Newbolt, Henry (1928). History of the Great War: Naval Operations: Vol. IV. London: Longmans Green. OCLC 220475138.
