= SMS S49 (1915) =

V25-class torpedo boat

History

German Empire
- Ordered: 1914
- Builder: Schichau-Werke, Elbing
- Launched: 10 April 1915
- Commissioned: 12 July 1915
- Fate: Interned at Scapa Flow 22 November 1918; Scuttled 21 June 1919; Salvaged and scrapped 1924

General characteristics
- Displacement: 1,074 t (1,057 long tons)
- Length: 79.6 m (261 ft 2 in)
- Beam: 8.36 m (27 ft 5 in)
- Draft: 3.64 m (11 ft 11 in)
- Propulsion: 3× water-tube boilers; 2× steam turbines; 24,000 metric horsepower (24,000 shp; 18,000 kW)
- Speed: 34.0 knots (63.0 km/h; 39.1 mph)
- Range: 1,270 nmi (2,350 km; 1,460 mi)at 20 knots (37 km/h; 23 mph)
- Complement: 88 officers and sailors
- Armament: 3 × 8.8 cm SK L/45 naval guns; 6 × 500 mm torpedo tubes; 24 mines

SMS S49 (Note: "SMS" stands for "Seiner Majestät Schiff" (transl. His Majesty's Ship)) (Note: The "S" in S49 denoted the shipbuilder who constructed her, in this case Schichau-Werke.) was a V25-class torpedo boat of the Imperial German Navy. S49 was built by Schichau-Werke, at their Elbing shipyard. She was launched on 10 April 1915 and completed in July that year.

S49 served in the North Sea and English Channel for the rest of the First World War. After the end of the war, she was interned at Scapa Flow, and was scuttled with the rest of the interned German fleet on 21 June 1919. S49's wreck was salvaged in 1924 and scrapped.

== Construction and design ==
On 6 August 1914, as a result of the outbreak of the First World War, the Imperial German Navy placed orders for 48 high-seas torpedo-boats, with 18, including S49, to be built by Schichau-Werke on 6 August 1914 as part of the 1914 mobilisation order. (Note: S49 was nominally a replacement for S35, which had been sold to Greece while under construction, but was repossessed by Germany on 10 August.) S49 was laid down at Schichau's Elbing (now Elbląg in Poland) as yard number 939, was launched on 10 April 1915 and commissioned on 12 July 1915.

S49 was 79.6 metres (261 ft 2 in) long overall and 79.0 metres (259 ft 2 in) at the waterline, with a beam of 8.36 metres (27 ft 5 in) and a draught of 3.64 metres (11 ft 11 in). Displacement was 802 tonnes (789 long tons) normal and 1,074 tonnes (1,057 long tons) deep load. Three oil-fired water-tube boilers fed steam to 2 sets of direct-drive steam turbines rated at 24,000 metric horsepower (24,000 shp; 18,000 kW), giving a speed of 34.0 knots (63.0 km/h; 39.1 mph). 252 tonnes (248 long tons) of fuel oil was carried, giving a range of 1,605 nautical miles (2,972 km; 1,847 mi) at 17 knots (31 km/h; 20 mph) and 1,270 nautical miles (2,350 km; 1,460 mi) at 20 knots (37 km/h; 23 mph).

Armament originally consisted of three 8.8 cm SK L/45 naval guns in single mounts, (Note: SK stood for Schnellfeuerkanone (quick-firing gun).) (Note: In Imperial German Navy gun nomenclature, the L/45 denotes the length of the gun. In this case, the L/45 gun is 45 caliber, meaning that the gun is 45 times as long as it is in diameter.) together with six 50 cm (19.7 in) torpedo tubes with two fixed single tubes forward and 2 twin mounts aft. Up to 24 mines could be carried. The ship had a complement of 85 officers and men.

== Service ==
=== 1915–1916 ===
Between 16 and 18 November 1915, S49, part of the 11th torpedo-boat half-flotilla, was one of 18 torpedo boats that carried out a sortie into the Skagerrak to intercept merchant shipping. On 10 February 1916, S49 took part in a sortie by 25 torpedo boats of the 2nd, 6th and 9th Torpedo-boat Flotillas into the North Sea. The sortie led to an encounter between several German torpedo boats and British minesweepers off the Dogger Bank, which resulted in the British minesweeper Arabis being torpedoed and sunk by ships of the 2nd Flotilla. On 25 March 1916, the British seaplane carrier Vindex, escorted by the Harwich force, launched an air attack against a Zeppelin base believed to be at Hoyer on the coast of Schleswig. The raid was a failure, with the airship base actually at Tondern, and while engaging German patrol boats, the British destroyer HMS Medusa was rammed by the destroyer HMS Laverock and badly damaged. (Medusa was later abandoned and eventually sank). Forces of the High Seas Fleet were ordered to sea in response to the attack, and on the evening of 25 March, 18 German torpedo boats of the 1st and 6th Torpedo Boat Flotillas, including S49 were deployed in a wide front with orders to search for Medusa to the North West of Horns Rev. The torpedo boat G194 of the 1st Flotilla encountered British cruisers and was rammed and sunk by the cruiser Cleopatra, which was then rammed and damaged by the cruiser Undaunted, while another German torpedo boat, S22, was sunk by a mine.

On 24 April 1916, the German battlecruisers of I Scouting Group and the light cruisers of the II Scouting Group set out from Kiel on a mission to bombard the British East-coast towns of Yarmouth and Lowestoft, with the torpedo boats of the 6th and 9th Torpedo Boat Flotillas as escorts, and S49 as part of the 6th Flotilla. The battleships of the High Seas Fleet were deployed in support, with the hope of destroying isolated elements of the British Forces if they tried to intercept. There was a brief engagement between the German forces and the light cruisers and destroyers of the Harwich Force, which caused the German battlecruisers to break off the bombardment of Lowestoft, but rather than take the chance to destroy the outnumbered British force, the Germans chose to retire. In May 1916, S49 was listed as part of the 11th half-flotilla of the 6th Torpedo Boat Flotilla. S43 did not sail with the rest of the 6th Torpedo-boat Flotilla when it left Kiel on 31 May 1916, and so missed the Battle of Jutland.

=== 1917–1918 ===
In January 1917, the 6th Flotilla was transferred to Flanders to reinforce the German torpedo boat forces based in the Belgian ports. Eleven torpedo boats of the flotilla, (Note: V69, G37, G41, V43, V44, V45, V46, S49, S50, G86 and G87.) including S49, set out from Helgoland for Flanders on 22 January, but decoding of German radio signals by Room 40 warned the British of the German intentions, and the Harwich Force of cruisers and destroyers sent to intercept the German torpedo boats. During the night of 22–23 January, the 6th Flotilla encountered three British light cruisers (Aurora, Conquest and Centaur). In a confused engagement, V69 was hit by a shell and collided with G41, with both badly damaged, although both survived the encounter, while S50 lost contact with the remainder of the flotilla and, after an encounter with a separate group of British destroyers in which Simoom was sunk, returned to Germany. The remaining eight ships of the flotilla reached Zeebrugge unharmed on 23 January. On the evening of 25 January, the 6th Torpedo boat Flotilla took part in a raid with the intent of attacking British patrols, but when none were encountered, shelled Southwold, damaging several buildings but causing no casualties. More unsuccessful sorties took place on the night of 29/30 January, and on 11/12 February 1917.

The Flanders-based torpedo boat forces were further reinforced on 19 February by the arrival of six large and four small torpedo boats, with the strengthened force being used to carry out new operations. On the night of 25/26 February, the Flanders-based torpedo boats launched a three-pronged attack against Allied shipping in the English Channel and the Dover Barrage. S49, commanded by Korvettenkapitän Werner Tillessen, led a force of six torpedo boats of the 6th Flotilla, (Note: S49, G37, V44, V45, V46 and G86) were to attack the Dover Barrage and bombard Dover, with five more torpedo boats to attack shipping on The Downs and three to operate off the River Maas against shipping running between the Netherlands and Britain. The 6th Flotilla ran into the British destroyer Laverock which was patrolling the Barrage. S49 and Laverock spotted each other, and S49 opened fire and fired a torpedo at Laverock, which avoided the torpedo. A heavy exchange of gunfire followed between the German torpedo boats and Laverock (which was hit by a torpedo that failed to explode), but no damage was sustained by either side. Believing that British forces were closing in, Tillessen ordered the 6th Flotilla to turn back for Zeebrugge, with the drifters of the Dover Barrage unharmed. The force sent against The Downs briefly shelled the North Foreland and Margate before withdrawing, hitting a house and killing three civilians but doing little other damage, while the patrol off the Mass encountered no ships.

The next major German attack took place on the night of 17/18 March 1917, with two groups of torpedo boats sent against the barrage, one of seven boats of the 6th Flotilla (Note: S49, G37, V43, V45, V46, G86 and G87.) led by S49 and commanded by Tillessen attacking the Northern part of the barrage, and one of 4 torpedo boats attacking the south, while four more torpedo boats were sent against The Downs. At 11:47 pm, S49, at the head of the 6th Flotilla, encountered the British destroyer Paragon on patrol. Paragon attempted to challenge the German ships, but S49 responded by opening fire with guns and torpedoes before Paragon had finished sending her challenge, with G86 firing two more torpedoes. Paragon was hit by two or three torpedoes, broke in half and sank. The explosion was spotted by the British destroyers Llewellyn and Laforey, which were patrolling nearby, and the two British ships went to pick up survivors, switching on searchlights to help rescue operations. The searchlights were spotted by S49, which was leading the 6th Flotilla back to Zeebrugge, and S49 and G87 carried out a torpedo attack on the British ships as they passed, hitting Llewellyn with one torpedo. Llelwellyn remained afloat, and made it back to Dover. The 6th Flotilla were not spotted by the British ships, with Laforey reporting that the attack had been by a submarine. Meanwhile, the force sent against the Downs sank the steamer Greypoint and shelled targets in Kent. The 6th Flotilla, including S49, returned to Germany on 29 March 1917.

S49 remained part of the 6th Torpedo Boat Flotilla in April 1918, and at the end of the war.

=== Scapa Flow and scuttling ===
After the end of hostilities, S49, along with most of the rest of the German fleet, was interned at Scapa Flow as required by the Armistice of 11 November 1918. On 21 June 1919, the German fleet at Scapa, including S49, was scuttled by its crews. S49's wreck was sold to the Scapa Flow Salvage Company on 26 April 1923, and was raised in December 1924 and scrapped at Scapa.

== Bibliography ==
- Campbell, John (1998). Jutland: An Analysis of the Fighting. London: Conway Maritime Press. ISBN 0-85177-750-3.
- Dodson, Aidan (2019). "Beyond the Kaiser: The IGN's Destroyers and Torpedo Boats After 1918". In Jordan, John (ed.). Warship 2019. Oxford, UK: Osprey Publishing. pp. 129–144. ISBN 978-1-4728-3595-6.
- Fock, Harald (1989). Z-Vor! Internationale Entwicklung und Kriegseinsätze von Zerstörern und Torpedobooten 1914 bis 1939 (in German). Herford, Germany: Koehlers Verlagsgesellschaft mBH. ISBN 3-7822-0207-4.
- Gardiner, Robert; Gray, Randal, eds. (1985). Conway's All The World's Fighting Ships 1906–1921. London: Conway Maritime Press. ISBN 0-85177-245-5.
- Goldrick, James (2018). After Jutland: The Naval War in Northern European Waters, June 1916–November 1918. Barnsley, UK: Seaforth Publishing. ISBN 978-1-5267-4298-8.
- Gladisch, Walter, ed. (1965). Der Krieg in der Nordsee: Band 7: Vom Sommer 1917 bis zum Kriegsende 1918. Frankfurt: Verlag E.S. Mittler & Sohn.
- Gröner, Erich; Jung, Dieter; Maass, Martin (1983). Die deutschen Kriegsschiffe 1815–1945: Band 2: Torpedoboote, Zerstörer, Schnellboote, Minensuchboote, Minenräumboote (in German). Koblenz: Bernard & Graef Verlag. ISBN 3-7637-4801-6.
- Groos, O. (1924). Der Krieg in der Nordsee: Vierter Band: Von Anfang Februar bis Ende Dezember 1915. Der Krieg zur See: 1914–1918 (in German). Berlin: Verlag von E. S. Mittler und Sohn – via National Library of Estonia.
- Halpern, Paul G. (1994). A Naval History of World War I. London: UCL Press. ISBN 1-85728-498-4.
- Karau, Mark D. (2014). The Naval Flank of the Western Front: The German MarineKorps Flandern 1914–1918. Barnsley, UK: Seaforth Publishing. ISBN 978-1-84832-231-8.
- Massie, Robert K. (2007). Castles of Steel: Britain, Germany and the Winning of the Great War at Sea. London: Vintage Books. ISBN 978-0-099-52378-9.
- Monograph No. 31: Home Waters Part VI: From October 1915 to May 1916 (PDF). Naval Staff Monographs (Historical). Vol. XV. Naval Staff, Training and Staff Duties Division. 1926.
- Monograph No. 32: Lowestoft Raid: 24th – 25th April, 1916 (PDF). Naval Staff Monographs (Historical). Vol. XVI. The Naval Staff, Training and Staff Duties Division. 1927.
- Monograph No. 34: Home Waters—Part VIII: December 1916 to April 1917 (PDF). Naval Staff Monographs (Historical). Vol. XVIII. The Naval Staff, Training and Staff Duties Division. 1933.
- Newbolt, Henry (1928). Naval Operations: Volume IV. History of the Great War: Based on Official Documents. London: Longmans Green & Co.
- Ruge, F. (1972). Warship Profile 27: SM Torpedo Boat B110. Profile Publications.
- Stoelzel, Albert (1930). Ehrenrangliste der Kaiserlich Deutschen Marine 1914–1918 (in German). Berlin: Thormann & Goetsch.
