= SMS V45 =

Large torpedo boat of the Imperial German Navy

History

German Empire
- Ordered: 1914 Peacetime order
- Builder: AG Vulcan Stettin, Germany
- Launched: 29 March 1915
- Commissioned: 30 September 1915
- Fate: Interned at Scapa Flow 22 November 1918; Scuttled at Scapa Flow 21 January 1919

General characteristics
- Displacement: 1,106 tonnes (1,089 long tons) deep load
- Length: 79.6 m (261 ft 2 in)
- Beam: 8.3 m (27 ft 3 in)
- Draft: 3.6 m (11 ft 10 in)
- Speed: 33.5 knots (62.0 km/h; 38.6 mph)
- Range: 2,050 nmi (3,800 km; 2,360 mi) at 17 knots (31 km/h; 20 mph)
- Complement: 87 officers and sailors
- Armament: 3 × 8.8 cm (3.5 in) SK L/45 guns; 6 × 500 mm torpedo tubes; 24 mines

SMS V45 was a 1913 Type large torpedo boat (Großes Torpedoboot) of the Imperial German Navy during World War I. V45 was built by AG Vulcan at their Stettin shipyard, being launched on 29 March 1915 and completed on 30 September that year.

V45 served with the German 6th Torpedo Boat Flotilla for the remainder of the war, taking part in the Battle of Jutland in 1916. The torpedo boat carried out operations in the English Channel and in the Baltic Sea, and took part in the Second Battle of Heligoland Bight in 1917.

V45 was interned at Scapa Flow following the end of the war, and was scuttled on 21 June 1919.

== Design and construction ==
On 22 April 1914, the Imperial German Navy ordered 12 torpedo boats as part of its 1914 shipbuilding programme, with six each ordered from Friedrich Krupp Germaniawerft and AG Vulcan.

Vulcan's design was 79.6 metres (261 ft 2 in) long overall and 78.8 metres (258 ft 6 in) between perpendiculars, with a beam of 8.3 metres (27 ft 3 in) and a draft of 3.6 metres (11 ft 10 in). Displacement was 952 tonnes (937 long tons) normal and 1,106 tonnes (1,089 long tons) deep load. Three oil-fired water-tube boilers fed steam to 2 sets of AEG-Vulcan steam turbines rated at 24,000 metric horsepower (24,000 shp; 18,000 kW), giving a speed of 33.5 knots (62.0 km/h; 38.6 mph). 338 tonnes (333 long tons) of fuel oil was carried, giving a range of 2,050 nautical miles (3,800 km; 2,360 mi) at 17 knots (31 km/h; 20 mph). Armament originally consisted of three 8.8 cm SK L/45 naval guns in single mounts, (Note: SK stood for Schnellfeuerkanone (quick-firing gun).) (Note: In Imperial German Navy gun nomenclature, the L/45 denotes the length of the gun. In this case, the L/45 gun is 45 caliber, meaning that the gun is 45 times as long as it is in diameter.) together with six 50 cm (19.7 in) torpedo tubes with two fixed single tubes forward and 2 twin mounts aft. Up to 24 mines could be carried. The ship had a complement of 87 officers and men.

V45 was laid down at Vulcan's Stettin shipyard in Prussia (now Szczecin in Poland) as yard number 360, was launched on 29 March 1915 and completed on 30 September 1915. The "V" in V45 denotes at which shipyard she was built (i.e. AG Vulcan).

== Service ==
=== 1915–1916 ===
V45 was assigned to the Sixth Torpedo Boat Flotilla, Twelfth Half-Flotilla, of the German High Seas Fleet. On 25 March 1916, the British seaplane carrier Vindex, escorted by the Harwich force, launched an air attack against a Zeppelin base believed to be at Hoyer on the coast of Schleswig. The raid was a failure, with the airship base actually at Tondern, and while engaging German patrol boats, the British destroyer HMS Medusa was rammed by the destroyer HMS Laverock and badly damaged. (Medusa was later abandoned and eventually sank). Forces of the High Seas Fleet were ordered to sea in response to the attack, and on the evening of 25 March, 18 German torpedo boats of the 1st and 6th Torpedo Boat Flotillas, including V45 were deployed in a wide front with orders to search for Medusa to the North West of Horns Rev. The torpedo boat G194 of the 1st Flotilla encountered British cruisers and was rammed and sunk by the cruiser Cleopatra, which was then rammed and damaged by the cruiser Undaunted, while another German torpedo boat, S22, was sunk by a mine. On 24 April 1916, the German battlecruisers of I Scouting Group and the light cruisers of the II Scouting Group set out from Kiel on a mission to bombard the British East-coast towns of Yarmouth and Lowestoft, with the torpedo boats of the 6th Torpedo Boat Flotilla (including V45) and 9th Torpedo Boat Flotilla as escorts. The battleships of the High Seas Fleet were deployed in support, with the hope of destroying isolated elements of the British Forces if they tried to intercept. There was a brief engagement between the German forces and the light cruisers and destroyers of the Harwich Force, which caused the German battlecruisers to break off the bombardment of Lowestoft, but rather than take the change to destroy the outnumbered British force, the Germans chose to retire.

On 31 May 1916, the High Seas Fleet left port for a sortie into the North Sea with the intent of luring British ships to battle, in what would become the Battle of Jutland, with V45, with the rest of the 6th Flotilla, escorting the battlecruisers of I Scouting Group. On first contact between German and British forces, the 6th Flotilla was deployed as part of a screen in front of the German battlecruisers, with V45 one of five torpedo boats of the 12th half-flotilla operating near the light cruiser Frankfurt. At about 19:00 CET (18:00 GMT), the 12th half-flotilla took part in a torpedo attack against the battlecruisers of the British 3rd Battlecruiser Squadron, with V45 launching a single torpedo. All of the torpedoes launched by the 12th half flotilla, the 9th Flotilla and the 2nd Flotilla in this attack missed. The German battlecruiser Lützow was badly damaged by British battlecruisers, and V45 was one of eight torpedo boats that went to Lützow' assistance. V45, together with G37, G38 and G40 laid a smoke screen to shield Lützow from view, but before this was effective, Lützow was hit with several more British shells. Flooding forced Lützow's crew to abandon ship from 01:55 CET on 1 June, with V45, G37, G38 and G40 taking off the battlecruiser's crew before G38 scuttled Lützow with torpedoes. Later that night, the four torpedo boats clashed twice briefly with British forces, with G40 damaged and having to be towed to base by G37. V45 launched three torpedoes in these clashes, all of which missed.

=== 1917–1918 ===
In January 1917, the 6th Flotilla was transferred to Flanders to reinforce the German torpedo boat forces based in the Belgian ports. Eleven torpedo boats of the flotilla, (Note: V69, G37, G41, V43, V44, V45, V46, S49, S50, G86 and G87.) including V45, set out from Helgoland for Flanders on 22 January, but decoding of German radio signals by Room 40 warned the British of the German intentions, and the Harwich Force of cruisers and destroyers sent to intercept the German torpedo boats. During the night of 22–23 January, the 6th Flotilla encountered three British light cruisers (Aurora, Conquest and Centaur). Both V69 and G41 were badly damaged in the encounter, while S50 lost contact with the remainder of the flotilla and, after an encounter with a separate group of British destroyers in which Simoom was sunk, returned to Germany. The remaining eight ships of the flotilla reached Zeebrugge unharmed on 23 January. On the night of 25/26 February, the Flanders-based torpedo boats launched a three-pronged attack against Allied shipping in the English Channel and the Dover Barrage. V45 was one of six torpedo boats of the 6th Flotilla, (Note: S49, G37, V44, V45, V46 and G86) which were tasked with attacking the Dover Barrage and shelling Dover, with five more torpedo boats sent against shipping on The Downs and three ordered to operate off the River Maas against shipping running between the Netherlands and Britain. The 6th Flotilla ran into the British destroyer Laverock which was patrolling the Barrage. A heavy exchange of gunfire followed between the German torpedo boats and Laverock (which was hit by a torpedo that failed to explode), but no damage was sustained by either side. Believing that British forces were closing in, the 6th Flotilla to turn back for Zeebrugge, with the drifters of the Dover Barrage unharmed. The force sent against The Downs briefly shelled the North Foreland and Margate before withdrawing, hitting a house and killing three civilians but doing little other damage, while the patrol off the Mass encountered no ships.

The next major German attack took place on the night of 17/18 March 1917, with two groups of torpedo boats sent against the barrage, one of seven boats of the 6th Flotilla (Note: S49, G37, V43, V45, V46, G86 and G87.) including V45 attacking the Northern part of the barrage, and one of 4 torpedo boats attacking the south, while four more torpedo boats were sent against The Downs. At 11:47 pm, the 6th Flotilla encountered the British destroyer Paragon on patrol. Paragon attempted to challenge the German ships, but was attacked by S49 and G86 before Paragon had finished sending her challenge. Paragon was hit by two or three torpedoes, broke in half and sank. The explosion was spotted by the British destroyers Llewellyn and Laforey, which were patrolling nearby, and the two British ships went to pick up survivors, switching on searchlights to help rescue operations. The searchlights were spotted the 6th Flotilla, which was returning to Zeebrugge, and S49 and G87 carried out a torpedo attack on the British ships as they passed, hitting Llewellyn with one torpedo. Llelwellyn remained afloat, and made it back to Dover. The 6th Flotilla were not spotted by the British ships, with Laforey reporting that the attack had been by a submarine. Meanwhile, the force sent against the Downs sank the steamer Greypoint and shelled targets in Kent. The 6th Flotilla returned to Germany on 29 March 1917.

In October 1917, Germany launched Operation Albion, an invasion of islands in the West Estonian archipelago to secure the left flank of the German Army following the German capture of Riga. The Germans assembled a powerful naval force to support the operation, reinforced by forces detached from the High Seas Fleet, including V45, operating with the 6th Torpedo Boat Flotilla. On 17 October, V45, along with the torpedo boats V44 and T139 were used to deliver ammunition to torpedo boats on patrol. On 17 November 1917, V45 was part of the covering force for minesweeping operations in the Heligoland Bight, when a British force, including the large cruisers Courageous and Glorious, eight light cruisers and ten destroyers attacked. In the resulting Second Battle of Heligoland Bight, the German covering force laid smoke and engaged the British force to allow the minesweepers to escape, then evaded the British until the appearance of the battleships of the German High Seas Fleet caused the British to break off the action. V45 carried out several torpedo attacks, launching four torpedoes at the British, although none found their mark. Only a single German trawler was sunk.

V45 remained part of the 12th half-flotilla of the 6th Torpedo Boat Flotilla at the end of the war.

== Internment and scuttling ==
After the end of hostilities, V45 was interned at Scapa Flow together with most of the German Fleet. On 21 June 1919, the German fleet at Scapa, including V45, was scuttled by its crews. V45's wreck was sold to the Scapa Flow Salvage Company on 26 April 1923, and was raised in September 1924 before being scrapped at Troon.

== Sources ==
- Campbell, John (1998). Jutland: An Analysis of the Fighting. London: Conway Maritime Press. ISBN 0-85177-750-3.
- Dodson, Aidan (2019). "Beyond the Kaiser: The IGN's Destroyers and Torpedo Boats After 1918". In Jordan, John (ed.). Warship 2019. Oxford, UK: Osprey Publishing. pp. 129–144. ISBN 978-1-4728-3595-6.
- Fock, Harald (1989). Z-Vor! Internationale Entwicklung und Kriegseinsätze von Zerstörern und Torpedobooten 1914 bis 1939 (in German). Herford, Germany: Koehlers Verlagsgesellschaft mBH. ISBN 3-7822-0207-4.
- Gagen, Ernst von (1964). Der Krieg in der Ostsee: Dritter Band: Von Anfang 1916 bis zum kriegsende. Der Krieg zur See: 1914–1918 (in German). Frankfurt, Germany: Verlag von E. S. Mittler und Sohn.
- Gardiner, Robert; Gray, Randal, eds. (1985). Conway's All The World's Fighting Ships 1906–1921. London: Conway Maritime Press. ISBN 0-85177-245-5.
- Gladisch, Walter, ed. (1965). Der Krieg in der Nordsee: Band 7: Vom Sommer 1917 bis zum Kriegsende 1918. Frankfurt: Verlag E.S. Mittler & Sohn.
- Gröner, Erich; Jung, Dieter; Maass, Martin (1983). Die deutschen Kriegsschiffe 1815–1945: Band 2: Torpedoboote, Zerstörer, Schnellboote, Minensuchboote, Minenräumboote (in German). Koblenz: Bernard & Graef Verlag. ISBN 3-7637-4801-6.
- Halpern, Paul G. (1994). A Naval History of World War I. London: UCL Press. ISBN 1-85728-498-4.
- Karau, Mark K. (2014). The Naval Flank of the Western Front: The German MarineKorps Flandern 1914–1918. Barnsley, UK: Seaforth Publishing. ISBN 978-1-84832-231-8.
- Massie, Robert K. (2007). Castles of Steel: Britain, Germany and the Winning of the Great War at Sea. London: Vintage Books. ISBN 978-0-099-52378-9.
- Monograph No. 31: Home Waters Part VI: From October 1915 to May 1916 (PDF). Naval Staff Monographs (Historical). Vol. XV. Naval Staff, Training and Staff Duties Division. 1926.
- Monograph No. 32: Lowestoft Raid: 24th – 25th April, 1916 (PDF). Naval Staff Monographs (Historical). Vol. XVI. The Naval Staff, Training and Staff Duties Division. 1927.
- Monograph No. 34: Home Waters—Part VIII: December 1916 to April 1917 (PDF). Naval Staff Monographs (Historical). Vol. XVIII. The Naval Staff, Training and Staff Duties Division. 1933.
- Newbolt, Henry (1928). Naval Operations: Volume IV. History of the Great War: Based on Official Documents. London: Longmans Green & Co.
- Newbolt, Henry (1931). Naval Operations: Vol. V. History of the Great War: Based on Official Documents. London: Longmans Green. OCLC 220475309.
- Tarrant, V. E. (1997). Jutland: The German Perspective. London: Arms & Armour Press. ISBN 1-85409-442-4.
