= List of ship commissionings in 1915 =

The list of ship commissionings in 1915 is a chronological list of ships commissioned in 1915. In cases where no official commissioning ceremony was held, the date of service entry may be used instead.

Date	Operator	Ship	Pennant	Class and type	Notes
3 January	Imperial German Navy	Regensburg		Graudenz-class cruiser	
19 January	Royal Navy	Queen Elizabeth		Queen Elizabeth-class battleship	
8 March	Royal Navy	Warspite	03	Queen Elizabeth-class battleship	
17 April	United States Navy	A-3	Submarine Torpedo Boat No. 4	Plunger-class submarine	recommissioned at Olongapo, Philippines
15 May	Royal Navy	Comus		C-class cruiser	
8 June	United States Navy	A-5	Submarine Torpedo Boat No. 6	Plunger-class submarine	recommissioned at Olongapo, Philippines
12 June	Royal Netherlands Navy	Friso		Brinio-class gunboat	
12 June	Royal Netherlands Navy	Gruno	N 2	Brinio-class gunboat	
24 June	Royal Navy	M33		M29-class monitor	
2 July	Imperial German Navy	Santa Elena	FS2	Converted merchant type seaplane carrier	Former SS Santa Elena
17 July	Imperial German Navy	Answald	FS1	Converted merchant type seaplane carrier	Former SS Answald
30 July	Imperial German Navy	G38		Großes Torpedoboot 1913 class	
8 August	Imperial German Navy	Lützow		Derfflinger-class battlecruiser	
20 August	Imperial German Navy	G39		Großes Torpedoboot 1913-class torpedo boat	
20 August	Imperial German Navy	Wiesbaden		Wiesbaden-class cruiser	
4 September	Imperial German Navy	Elbing		Pillau-class light cruiser	
16 September	Imperial German Navy	G40		Großes Torpedoboot 1913 class	
30 September	Royal Navy	Canada		Dreadnought battleship	
30 September	Imperial German Navy	V45		Großes Torpedoboot 1913 class	
6 October	Regia Marina	Europa		Seaplane carrier	Former SS Quarto
14 October	Imperial German Navy	G41		Großes Torpedoboot 1913 class	
19 October	Royal Navy	Barham	04	Queen Elizabeth-class battleship	
10 November	Imperial German Navy	G42		Großes Torpedoboot 1913 class	
13 December	Austro-Hungarian Navy	Szent István		Tegetthoff-class battleship	
20 December	Royal Navy	Champion		C-class cruiser	
