= SMS G37 =

Großes Torpedoboot 1913 class torpedo boat

History

German Empire
- Ordered: 1914 Peacetime order
- Builder: Germaniawerft, Kiel, Germany
- Launched: 17 December 1914
- Commissioned: 29 June 1915
- Fate: Sunk by a mine, 4 November 1917

General characteristics
- Displacement: 1,051 t (1,034 long tons)
- Length: 79.5 m (260 ft 10 in) o/a
- Beam: 8.4 m (27 ft 7 in)
- Draught: 3.5 m (11 ft 6 in)
- Installed power: 24,000 PS (24,000 shp; 18,000 kW)
- Propulsion: 3 × water tube boilers; 2 × Germania Steam Turbines
- Speed: 34 kn (63 km/h; 39 mph)
- Range: 1,685 nmi (3,121 km; 1,939 mi) at 17 kn (31 km/h; 20 mph)
- Complement: 83 officers and sailors
- Armament: 3 × 8.8 cm (3.5 in) L/45 guns; 6 × 500 mm torpedo tubes; 24 mines

SMS G37 was a 1913 Type Large Torpedo Boat (Großes Torpedoboot) of the Imperial German Navy during World War I, and the 13th ship of her class.

== Construction ==
G37 was ordered from Germaniawerft in April 1914 as part of the 1914 order of high-seas torpedo-boats (with a half-flotilla of 6 ordered from Germaniawerft and a second half-flotilla from AG Vulcan). She was launched from Germaniawerft's Kiel shipyard on 17 December 1914 and commissioned on 29 June 1915. The "G" in G37 refers to the shipyard at which she was constructed.

G37 was 79.5 metres (260 ft 10 in) long overall and 78.6 metres (257 ft 10 in) at the waterline, with a beam of 8.4 metres (27 ft 7 in) and a draft of 3.5 metres (11 ft 6 in). Displacement was 822 tonnes (809 long tons) normal and 1,051 tonnes (1,034 long tons) deep load. Three oil-fired water-tube boilers fed steam to 2 sets of Germania steam turbines rated at 24,000 metric horsepower (24,000 shp; 18,000 kW), giving a speed of 34 knots (63 km/h; 39 mph). 299 tonnes (294 long tons) of fuel oil was carried, giving a range of 1,685 nautical miles (3,121 km; 1,939 mi) at 17 knots (31 km/h; 20 mph) and 1,300 nautical miles (2,400 km; 1,500 mi) at 20 knots (37 km/h; 23 mph).

Armament consisted of three 8.8 cm SK L/45 naval guns in single mounts, together with six 50 cm (19.7 in) torpedo tubes with two fixed single tubes forward and 2 twin mounts aft. Up to 24 mines could be carried. The ship had a complement of 87 officers and men.

== Service ==
On 16–18 November 1915, G37, part of the Eleventh Torpedo Boat Half Flotilla, took part in operations by 18 torpedo boats in the Skagerrak to intercept merchant shipping. On 10 February 1916, G37 took part in a sortie by 25 torpedo boats of the 2nd, 6th and 9th Torpedo-boat Flotillas into the North Sea. The sortie led to an encounter between several German torpedo boats and British minesweepers off the Dogger Bank, which resulted in the British minesweeper Arabis being torpedoed and sunk by ships of the 2nd Flotilla.

G37 was assigned to the Sixth Torpedo Boat Flotilla, Twelfth Half-Flotilla, of the High Seas Fleet at the Battle of Jutland. Early in the battle, she fell astern of the rest of her flotilla, because she had temporarily lost power from a boiler, and fired two torpedoes at British light cruisers at about 17:44 CET (i.e. 16:44 GMT). The 12th Half Flotilla attempted a torpedo attack against the battlecruisers of the British 3rd Battlecruiser Squadron at about 19:00 CET. While V69 fired two torpedoes and S50 and V45 both fired a single torpedo at the battlecruisers, the light cruisers of the German 2nd Scouting Group fouled G37's line of fire, and instead she fired a single torpedo at British destroyers. None of the torpedoes from this attack, or one immediately afterwards from the 9th Flotilla, hit their targets. The battlecruiser Lützow had been badly damaged by shells from British battlecruisers, and G37 was one of seven German torpedo boats tasked with escorting Lützow. Heavy flooding forced the crew of Lützow to abandon ship at 01:55 CET, 1 June. G37, together with G38, G40 and V45 came alongside to take off Lützow's crew before the battlecruiser was scuttled by G38. Later that night (at about 03:25 CET) the four torpedo boats took part in a brief engagement with the British destroyers Contest and Garland in which neither side received further damage. The four torpedo boats had another encounter with British forces at 04:25 CET when they encountered the light cruiser Champion and the destroyers Obdurate, Moresby, Marksman and Maenad. G40 was damaged by a shell from Champion and had to be taken under tow by G37.

On 18 August 1916, the High Seas Fleet sailed on a sortie to bombard Sunderland in order to draw out units of the British Fleet and destroy them. G37 formed part of the Seventh Torpedo Boat Flotilla, but no general fleet engagement took place, despite both the High Seas Fleet and the British Grand Fleet being at sea at the same time.

On 22 January 1917, 11 torpedo boats of the 6th Torpedo Boat Flotilla, including G37 left Helgoland to reinforce the German torpedo forces in Flanders. The British Admiralty knew about this transfer due to codebreaking by Room 40, and ordered the Harwich Force of cruisers and destroyers to intercept the German torpedo boats. During the night of 22–23 January, the 6th Flotilla encountered three British light cruisers (Aurora, Conquest and Centaur). The Germans attempted a torpedo attack against the British cruisers, but were driven off by heavy fire and broke off the attack behind a smoke-screen. V69, leader of the flotilla, was hit by three shells, one of which jammed her rudder, forcing her to move in a circle, resulting in G41 colliding with V69, badly damaging both torpedo boats, although both survived. The remainder of the flotilla, including G37, escaped unharmed and continued on to Flanders.

On the night of 25/26 February, the Flanders-based torpedo boats launched a three-pronged attack against Allied shipping in the English Channel and the Dover Barrage. Six ships of the 6th Flotilla, including G37 were to attack the Dover Barrage, while other torpedo boats were to attack shipping on The Downs and off the mouth of the River Maas. The 6th Flotilla ran into the British destroyer Laverock which was patrolling the Barrage. While the German ships attacked Laverock with heavy gunfire and torpedoes (one of which hit the British destroyer but failed to explode), the British destroyer only received light damage, and the 6th Flotilla turned back for Zeebrugge, with the drifters of the Dover Barrage unharmed. The Flanders-based flotillas attacked again on the night of 17/18 March. Seven torpedo boats of the 6th Flotilla (S49, G86, G87, G37, V43, V45 and V46) were to attack the Dover Barrage north of the Sandettie Bank, with five torpedo boats of the 1st Zeebrugge Half-Flotilla attacking south of the Sandettie Bank, and four ships of the 2nd Zeebrugge Half-Flotilla operating against the Downs. The 6th Flotilla met the British destroyer Paragon on crossing the Dover Barrage. Paragon challenged the German torpedo boats, which replied with gunfire and torpedoes, Paragon being struck by torpedoes from S49 and G46 and sunk. The 12th Half-Flotilla (including G37) became separated from the rest of the 6th Flotilla and therefore returned to base, while the remaining three ships of the flotilla continued on, torpedoing and badly damaging the destroyer Llewellen before returning to base, while a merchant ship was sunk by the 2nd Zeebrugge Half-Flotilla east of the Downs. The 6th Flotilla returned to Germany on 29 March 1917.

On 4 November 1917 at 04:55 hours, G37 struck a mine, part of a minefield laid on the night of 30/31 May 1917 by the British destroyer Abdiel and the light cruisers Blanche and Royalist, in the southern North Sea off Walcheren Island, Netherlands (54°19′N 04°55′E) and sank. Four sailors died in this incident.
