= G37 =

G37, G-37 or G.37 may refer to:

- Infiniti G37, an automobile
- SMS G37, an Imperial German Navy torpedo boat
- Glock 37, a firearm
