= V46 =

V46 may refer to:

- Diesel model V-46, a Soviet tank engine
- SMS V46, a torpedo boat of the Imperial German Navy
- Vanadium-46, an isotope of vanadium
