= SMS S49 =

List of ships with the same or similar names

Two ships of the German Imperial Navy were named SMS S49. They were both torpedo boats built by Schichau-Werke.

- SMS S49 (1890) - torpedo boat launched by Schichau on 30 January 1890. Renamed T49 in 1910. Scrapped 1920.
- SMS S49 (1915) - "large"- or "high-seas"-torpedo boat, launched by Schichau on 10 April 1915. Scuttled at Scapa Flow on 21 June 1919.
