= SMS V25 =

Imperial German torpedo boat sunk in the First World War

History

German Empire
- Ordered: 1913
- Builder: AG Vulcan, Stettin
- Launched: 29 January 1914
- Commissioned: 27 June 1914
- Fate: Sunk 13 February 1915

General characteristics
- Class & type: V25-class torpedo boat
- Displacement: 975 t (960 long tons)
- Length: 78.5 m (257 ft 7 in)
- Beam: 8.33 m (27 ft 4 in)
- Draft: 3.63 m (11 ft 11 in)
- Installed power: 23,500 PS (23,200 shp; 17,300 kW)
- Propulsion: 3 × water tube boilers; 2 × AEG Vulcan Steam Turbines
- Speed: 33.5 kn (62.0 km/h; 38.6 mph)
- Range: 1,950 nmi (3,610 km; 2,240 mi) at 17 kn (31 km/h; 20 mph)
- Complement: 83 officers and sailors
- Armament: 3 × 8.8 cm (3.5 in) L/45 guns; 6 × 500 mm torpedo tubes; 24 mines

SMS V25 (Note: "SMS" stands for Seiner Majestät Schiff ('His Majesty's Ship')) (Note: The "V" in V25 denoted the shipbuilder who constructed her.) was a V25-class torpedo boat of the Imperial German Navy that served during the First World War. The ship was built by AG Vulcan at Stettin in Prussia (now Szczecin in Poland), and was completed in June 1914. The ship was sunk by a British mine on 13 February 1915.

== Construction and design ==
In 1913, the Imperial German Navy placed orders for 12 high-seas torpedo boats, with six each ordered from AG Vulcan (V25–V30) and Schichau-Werke (S31–S36). While the designs built by each shipyard were broadly similar, they differed from each other in detail, and were significantly larger and more capable than the small torpedo boats built for the German Navy in the last two years.

V25 was launched from AG Vulcan's Stettin shipyard on 29 January 1914 and commissioned on 27 June 1914.

V25 was 78.5 metres (257 ft 7 in) long overall and 77.8 metres (255 ft 3 in) at the waterline, with a beam of 8.33 metres (27 ft 4 in) and a draft of 3.63 metres (11 ft 11 in). Displacement was 812 tonnes (799 long tons) normal and 975 tonnes (960 long tons) deep load. Three oil-fired water-tube boilers fed steam to 2 sets of AEG-Vulcan steam turbines rated at 23,500 metric horsepower (23,200 shp; 17,300 kW), giving a speed of 33.5 knots (62.0 km/h; 38.6 mph). 225 tonnes (221 long tons) of fuel oil was carried, giving a range of 1,080 nautical miles (2,000 km; 1,240 mi) at 20 knots (37 km/h; 23 mph).

Armament consisted of three 8.8 cm SK L/45 naval guns in single mounts, together with six 50 cm (19.7 in) torpedo tubes with two fixed single tubes forward and 2 twin mounts aft. Up to 24 mines could be carried. The ship had a complement of 83 officers and men.

== Service ==
The newly completed V25 was one of the few modern German torpedo boats in the Baltic suitable for offensive operations on the outbreak of the First World War and was deployed as part of the Baltic coast-defence division. On 7 September V25 took part in a sortie into the Gulf of Bothnia with the cruiser Augsburg which resulted in the sinking of a Russian steamer off Raumo. By October 1914 V25 was part of the 17th Half-flotilla of the High Seas Fleet.

On 14 January 1915, the cruisers Strassburg and Stralsund, escorted by the 9th Torpedo boat Flotilla, including V25, set out to lay a minefield off the Humber. The weather was extremely poor, with the torpedo-boats struggling in the heavy seas, and after V25 collided with sister ship V26 causing minor damage, the destroyers turned back, leaving the two cruisers to carry on unescorted. The minefield claimed a British trawler, Windsor, on 22 January.

On 12 February, five torpedo boats of the 9th Flotilla were deployed to screen minesweeping operations near the Amrum Bank in the North Sea. When V25 did not return from this operation, a search found wreckage north of Helgoland. At the time it was believed that she had been sunk by a British submarine, although in fact, no British submarines were in the vicinity, and V25 had probably been sunk by a British mine. All 79 of her crew were lost, including Korvettenkapitän Paul Jacobi, commanding officer of the 17 Half-flotilla, after whom the destroyer Paul Jacobi was named in the 1930s.

== Bibliography ==
- Firle, Rudolph (1921). Der Krieg in der Ostsee: Erster Band: Von Kriegsbeginn bis Mitte März 1915. Der Krieg zur See: 1914–1918 (in German). Berlin: Verlag von E. S. Mittler und Sohn.
- Gardiner, Robert; Gray, Randal, eds. (1985). Conway's All The World's Fighting Ships 1906–1921. London: Conway Maritime Press. ISBN 0-85177-245-5.
- Gröner, Erich (1983). Die deutschen Kriegsschiffe 1815–1945: Band 2: Torpedoboote, Zerstörer, Schnelleboote, Minensuchboote, Minenräumboote. Koblenz, Germany: Bernard & Graefe Verlag. ISBN 3-7637-4801-6.
- Halpern, Paul G. (1994). A Naval History of World War I. London: UCL Press. ISBN 1-85728-498-4.
- Koop, Gerhard; Schmolke, Klaus-Peter (2014). German Destroyers of World War II. Barnsley, UK: Seaforth Publishing. ISBN 978-1-84832-193-9.
- Monograph No. 28: Home Waters—Part III. From November 1914 to the end of January 1915 (PDF). Naval Staff Monographs (Historical). Vol. XII. The Naval Staff, Training and Staff Duties Division. 1925.
- Monograph No. 29: Home Waters—Part IV. From February to July 1915 (PDF). Naval Staff Monographs (Historical). Vol. XIII. The Naval Staff, Training and Staff Duties Division. 1925.
