= SMS G38 =

Large Torpedo Boat of the Imperial German Navy

History

German Empire
- Ordered: 1914 Peacetime order
- Builder: Germaniawerft, Kiel, Germany
- Launched: 23 December 1914
- Commissioned: 30 July 1915
- Fate: Interned at Scapa Flow 22 November 1918; Scuttled at Scapa Flow 21 June 1919

General characteristics
- Class & type: V25-class torpedo boat
- Displacement: 1,051 tonnes
- Length: 79.5 m (260 ft 10 in)
- Beam: 8.33 m (27 ft 4 in)
- Draft: 3.74 m (12 ft 3 in) (fwd); 3.45 m (11 ft 4 in) (aft)
- Speed: 34.5 knots (63.9 km/h)
- Range: 1,100 nautical miles at 20 knots; (2,040 km at 37 km/h)
- Complement: 83 officers and sailors
- Armament: 3 × 8.8 cm (3.5 in) SK L/45 guns; 6 × 500 mm torpedo tubes; 24 mines

SMS G38 was a 1913 Type Large Torpedo Boat (Großes Torpedoboot) of the Imperial German Navy (Kaiserliche Marine) during World War I, and the 14th ship of her class.

== Service ==
Built by Germaniawerft in Kiel, Germany, she was launched in December 1914.

G38 was assigned to the First Torpedo Boat Flotilla of the High Seas Fleet of the Kaiserliche Marine. When she participated in the Battle of Jutland she was assigned to escort the battlecruiser SMS Lützow. In this action, Lützow was severely damaged such that she was unable to return to German waters. After assisting SMS G37, G40 and V45 in the evacuation of survivors, G38 was ordered to scuttle Lützow by launching two torpedoes into her.

After the end of hostilities, G38, as a part of the 1st Torpedo Half Flotilla under Kapitänleutnant Reinhold Henrici (SMS G. 38, SMS G. 39, SMS G. 40, SMS G. 86 and SMS V. 129), was interned at Scapa Flow in November 1918 and scuttled along with most of the fleet on 21 June 1919. She was salvaged for scrap by Ernest Cox in 1924.
