= HMS Llewellyn (1913) =

British L-Class destroyer, WW1

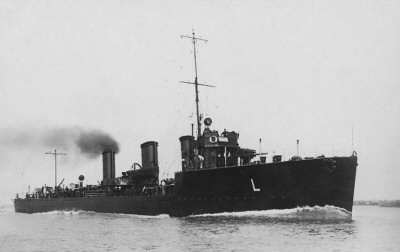
- Sister ship Laertes

History

United Kingdom
- Name: HMS Llewellyn
- Builder: William Beardmore and Company, Dalmuir
- Yard number: 511
- Laid down: 14 December 1912
- Launched: 30 October 1913
- Completed: 31 March 1914
- Decommissioned: 18 March 1922
- Fate: Broken up

General characteristics (as built)
- Class & type: Laforey-class destroyer
- Displacement: 965 long tons (980 t) (normal); 1,150 long tons (1,170 t) (deep load)
- Length: 268 ft 8 in (81.9 m) (o/a)
- Beam: 27 ft 8 in (8.43 m)
- Draught: 10 ft 6 in (3.20 m)
- Installed power: 4 Yarrow boilers, 24,500 shp (18,300 kW)
- Propulsion: Parsons steam turbines, 2 shafts
- Speed: 29 knots (33.4 mph; 53.7 km/h)
- Range: 1,720 nmi (3,190 km) at 15 kn (28 km/h)
- Complement: 73
- Armament: 3 × single QF 4-inch (102 mm) Mark IV guns; 1 × single 7.7 mm (0.3 in) Maxim gun; 2 × twin 21 in (533 mm) torpedo tubes

HMS Llewellyn was a Laforey-class destroyer that served with the Royal Navy. Laid down on 14 December 1912 as HMS Picton, the ship was renamed on 30 September 1913 under an Admiralty order to become one of the first alphabetical class destroyers, being launched on 30 October. On commissioning, the vessel joined the Third Destroyer Flotilla and operated as part of the Harwich Force during the First World War. The destroyer took part in the Battle of Heligoland Bight, as well as undertaking anti-submarine patrols and escort duties. During one of these patrols, on 4 December 1916 the vessel unsuccessfully attacked the German submarine UB-18. On 17 March 1917, the destroyer was struck in the bow by a torpedo launched by a German torpedo boat while rescuing survivors from the sunk destroyer Paragon, but returned to port safely by steaming backwards. With the cessation of hostilities, the ship was placed in reserve. Llewellyn was subsequently offered for sale to the Finnish Navy, but was withdrawn from service and sold to be broken up on 18 March 1922.

== Design and development ==
Llewellyn was one of twenty-two L- or Laforey-class destroyers built for the Royal Navy. The design followed the preceding Acasta class but with improved seakeeping properties and armament, including twice the number of torpedo tubes. The vessel was one of the last pre-war destroyers constructed by William Beardmore and Company for the British Admiralty.

The destroyer had a length overall of 268 feet 8 inches (81.89 m), a beam of 27 feet 8 inches (8.43 m) and a draught of 10 feet 6 inches (3.20 m). Displacement was 965 long tons (980 t) normal and 1,150 long tons (1,170 t) deep load. Power was provided by four Yarrow boilers feeding two Parsons steam turbines rated at 24,500 shaft horsepower (18,300 kW) and driving two shafts, to give a design speed of 29 knots (54 km/h; 33 mph). Three funnels were fitted. The ship carried 105 long tons (107 t) of oil, which gave a design range of 1,720 nautical miles (3,190 km; 1,980 mi) at 15 knots (28 km/h; 17 mph), but this could be increased to 270 long tons (270 t) in times of peace. Fuel consumption was 51.33 long tons (52.15 t) of oil in 24 hours during tests. The ship's complement was 73 officers and ratings.

Armament consisted of three QF 4 in (102 mm) Mk IV guns on the ship's centreline, with one on the forecastle, one aft and one between the funnels. The guns could fire a shell weighing 31 pounds (14 kg) at a muzzle velocity of 2,177 feet per second (664 m/s). One single 7.7 mm (0.3 in) Maxim gun was carried. A single 2-pounder 40 mm (2 in) "pom-pom" anti-aircraft gun was later added. Torpedo armament consisted of two twin mounts for 21 in (533 mm) torpedoes mounted aft. Capacity to lay four Vickers Elia Mk.4 mines was included, but never used.

== Construction and career ==
Picton was ordered by the British Admiralty under the 1912–1913 Programme as part of a class of destroyers named after characters in Shakespeare's plays and the Waverley novels by Sir Walter Scott. The ship was laid down by William Beardmore and Company at Dalmuir on the River Clyde on 14 December 1912 with the yard number 511. The ship was renamed Llewellyn by Admiralty order on 30 September 1913, joining what was to be the first class named alphabetically, a convention subsequently used for all destroyer classes. The new name commemorated either Llywelyn the Great or Llywelyn ap Gruffudd. The destroyer was constructed at the yard alongside sister ship Lennox. Llewellyn was launched on 30 October 1913 and completed on 31 March the following year.

On commissioning, Llewellyn joined the Third Destroyer Flotilla as part of the Harwich Force. At the start of the First World War, the flotilla was tasked with harassing the Imperial German Navy, and on 26 August 1914 was ordered to attack German torpedo boats on their patrol as part of a large Royal Navy fleet in what was to be the Battle of Heligoland Bight. The following day, the flotilla joined the battle, led by the scout cruiser Fearless, attacking the torpedo boats until the light cruiser Stettin appeared on the scene. Subsequently, the flotillas drove off the cruisers Cöln and Strassburg for no loss. In the melee, Llewellyn fired 86 shells.

After that period of intense activity, the destroyer returned to Harwich to defend the Strait of Dover and spent 1915 actively involved in the myriad of tasks that were typical of destroyer service at the time. For example, the destroyer returned to Heligoland Bight to escort British minelayers on 8 January, undertook sweeps for German submarines in the Irish Sea on 29 and 30 January, escorted troop convoys to France on 1 and 2 April, and protected minesweepers working on Dogger Bank on 1 and 2 June. On 20 February 1916, the destroyer collided with sister ship Lark, suffering minor damage; she was soon back in service, and on 25 March formed part of the escort for the seaplane carrier Vindex which, although unsuccessful in its primary mission of bombing the German Zeppelin sheds in Tønder, did achieve the objective of drawing out the German battlecruisers of the High Seas Fleet. The ship spent much of the rest of the year on anti-submarine patrols and, on 4 December, unsuccessfully attacked the German submarine UB-18 with depth charges.

On 28 February 1917, the destroyer was transferred to Dover. On 17 March, the ship formed part of a flotilla including Laertes, Laforey and Paragon patrolling the Dover Barrage. German torpedo boats attacked and sank Paragon. Llewellyn, seeing gun flashes, went to attend and switched on a searchlight to assist in picking up survivors. Alerted by the light, torpedo boats S49 and G87 attacked and launched two torpedoes, one of which struck the destroyer in the bow, but the ship was able to return to port without suffering casualties by steaming backwards. The destroyer was subsequently redeployed to the Methil Convoy Flotilla based on the Firth of Forth. On 22 April 1918, Llewellyn left Selbjørnsfjorden, Norway, escorting a convoy with Lark. The German High Seas Fleet set out to destroy the ships but failed to find them and returned to their base without a shot being fired. This proved one of the last capital ship sorties of the conflict.

After the Armistice of 11 November 1918 that ended the war, the Royal Navy returned to a lower-cost peacetime level, with the number of ships and personnel reduced. Llewellyn was initially placed in reserve at Portsmouth alongside fifty other destroyers. The destroyer was subsequently offered for sale to the Finnish Navy but the purchase was halted by the provisions of the Washington Naval Treaty which banned the sale of superfluous warships by the signatories and instead required them to be scrapped. In consequence, on 18 March 1922, the vessel was decommissioned, sold to J. Smith of Poole, and broken up.

== Pennant numbers ==
Pennant number	Date
H99	December 1914
H61	January 1918
H83	January 1919
