= SMS G40 =

Large Torpedo Boat of the Imperial German Navy

History

German Empire
- Ordered: 1914 Peacetime order
- Builder: Germaniawerft, Kiel, Germany
- Launched: 27 February 1915
- Commissioned: 16 September 1915
- Fate: Interned at Scapa Flow 22 November 1918; Scuttled at Scapa Flow 21 June 1919

General characteristics
- Displacement: 1,051 tonnes
- Length: 79.5 meters
- Beam: 8.33 m
- Draft: 3.74 m (fwd); 3.45 meters (aft)
- Speed: 34.5 knots (63.9 km/h)
- Range: 1,100 nautical miles at 20 knots; (2,040 km at 37 km/h)
- Complement: 83 officers and sailors
- Armament: 3 × 8.8 cm (3.5 in) SK L/45 guns; 6 × 500 mm torpedo tubes; 24 mines

SMS G40 was a 1913 Type Large Torpedo Boat (Großes Torpedoboot) of the Imperial German Navy (Deutschen Kaiserliche Marine) during World War I, and the 16th ship of her class.

== Construction ==
Built by Germaniawerft in Kiel, Germany, she was launched in February 1915.

== Service ==
G40 was assigned to the First Torpedo Boat Flotilla of the High Seas Fleet of the German Imperial Navy. When she participated in the Battle of Jutland she was assigned to escort the battlecruiser SMS Lützow. In this action, Lützow was severely damaged such that she was unable to return to German waters. She assisted SMS G37, SMS G38 and SMS V45 in the evacuation of survivors. Naval gunfire from pursuing British vessels subsequently damaged G40's engines and she had to be towed back to German waters.

After the end of hostilities, G40, as a part of the 1st Torpedo Half Flotilla under Kapitänleutnant Reinhold Henrici (SMS G. 38, SMS G. 39, SMS G. 40, SMS G. 86 and SMS V. 129), was interned at Scapa Flow and scuttled on 21 July 1919. She was salvaged for scrap by Ernest Cox in 1925.

== See also ==
- Scuttling of the German fleet at Scapa Flow
