= SMS S50 =

V25-class torpedo boat

History

German Empire
- Ordered: 1914
- Builder: Schichau-Werke, Elbing
- Launched: 23 April 1915
- Commissioned: 15 August 1915
- Fate: Interned at Scapa Flow 22 November 1918; Scuttled 21 June 1919; Salvaged and scrapped 1925

General characteristics
- Displacement: 1,074 t (1,057 long tons)
- Length: 79.6 m (261 ft 2 in)
- Beam: 8.36 m (27 ft 5 in)
- Draft: 3.64 m (11 ft 11 in)
- Propulsion: 3× water-tube boilers; 2× steam turbines; 24,000 metric horsepower (24,000 shp; 18,000 kW)
- Speed: 34.0 knots (63.0 km/h; 39.1 mph)
- Range: 1,270 nmi (2,350 km; 1,460 mi)at 20 knots (37 km/h; 23 mph)
- Complement: 88 officers and sailors
- Armament: 3 × 8.8 cm SK L/45 naval guns; 6 × 500 mm torpedo tubes; 24 mines

SMS S50 was a V25-class torpedo boat of the Imperial German Navy. Launched in 1915, she served through the rest of the war, taking part in the Battle of Jutland and operations in the Baltic. She was scuttled at Scapa Flow in 1919, but was later raised and scrapped.

== Construction and design ==
Ordered from Schichau-Werke on 6 August 1914 as part of the 1914 mobilisation order of 48 high-seas torpedo-boats, she was launched from Schichau's Elbing (now Elbląg in Poland) on 24 April 1915 and commissioned on 15 August 1915. The "S" in S50 denoted the shipbuilder who constructed her.

S50 was 79.6 metres (261 ft 2 in) long overall and 79.0 metres (259 ft 2 in) at the waterline, with a beam of 8.36 metres (27 ft 5 in) and a draught of 3.64 metres (11 ft 11 in). Displacement was 802 tonnes (789 long tons) normal and 1,074 tonnes (1,057 long tons) deep load. Three oil-fired water-tube boilers fed steam to 2 sets of direct-drive steam turbines rated at 24,000 metric horsepower (24,000 shp; 18,000 kW), giving a speed of 34.0 knots (63.0 km/h; 39.1 mph). 252 tonnes (248 long tons) of fuel oil was carried, giving a range of 1,605 nautical miles (2,972 km; 1,847 mi) at 17 knots (31 km/h; 20 mph) and 1,270 nautical miles (2,350 km; 1,460 mi) at 20 knots (37 km/h; 23 mph).

Armament originally consisted of three 8.8 cm SK L/45 naval guns in single mounts, together with six 50 cm (19.7 in) torpedo tubes with two fixed single tubes forward and 2 twin mounts aft. Up to 24 mines could be carried. In 1916 the 8.8 cm guns were replaced by three 10.5 cm SK L/45 naval guns. The ship had a complement of 85 officers and men.

== Service ==
S50 first operated in the Baltic Sea after commissioning, and when on the night of 20 November 1915, seven Russian destroyers led by Novik attacked German patrol boats off Windau (now Ventspils in Latvia), sinking the auxiliary patrol boat Norburg, S50 was one of several German torpedo boats and cruisers that sortied in response, but the Russians escaped unscathed.

On 10 February 1916, S50 took part in a sortie by 25 torpedo boats of the 2nd, 6th and 9th Torpedo-boat Flotillas into the North Sea. The sortie led to an encounter between several German torpedo boats and British minesweepers off the Dogger Bank, which resulted in the British minesweeper Arabis being torpedoed and sunk by ships of the 2nd Flotilla. S50 took part in the Bombardment of Yarmouth and Lowestoft on 24–25 April 1916, where she formed part of the escort for the battlecruisers of the I Scouting Group. At the Battle of Jutland on 31 May–1 June 1916, S50 was part of the 12th Half-Flotilla, 6th Torpedo Boat Flotilla, again operating in support of the I Scouting Group. The 12th Half Flotilla attempted a torpedo attack against the battlecruisers of the British 3rd Battlecruiser Squadron at about 19:00 CET (i.e. 18:00 GMT), with S50 firing a single torpedo which circled rather than running straight. None of the four torpedoes launched by the Flotilla in this engagement found their target. Later that evening, S50, V69 and V46 were sent to the rear of the retiring German fleet in order to carry out night torpedo attacks on the British fleet. They were fired on by the 2nd Light Cruiser Squadron at about 21:52 CET and turned away, with S50 being hit by a British six-inch (152-mm) shell, which although it did not explode, knocked out one of her boilers and reduced her speed to 25 knots (46 km/h; 29 mph). She returned to the main German fleet while V69 and V46 continued on their patrol. At about 02:00 CET on 1 June, S50 was sailing in the vicinity of the battleship Grosser Kurfürst when the British 12th Destroyer Flotilla launched a torpedo attack on the German battleships. The German battleships responded with heavy fire, and when S50 turned towards the British ships, she was fired on by her own side, and a German shell hit one of her ventilators. The pre-dreadnought battleship Pommern was sunk with the loss of all hands by a single torpedo from the British destroyer Onslaught in this attack.

In January 1917, the 6th Flotilla was transferred to Flanders to reinforce the German torpedo boat forces based in the Belgian ports. The Flotilla set out from Helgoland for Flanders on 22 January, but decoding of German radio signals by Room 40 warned the British of the German intentions, and the Harwich Force of cruisers and destroyers sent to intercept the German torpedo boats. The British set six light cruisers, two flotilla leaders and sixteen destroyers to intercept the eleven German ships, deploying them in several groups to make sure that all possible routes were covered. At about 03:45 hr CET (02:45 hr GMT) on the night of 22/23 January, the 6th Flotilla encountered three British light cruisers (Aurora, Conquest and Centaur) east of the North Hinder light ship. V69, leader of the German flotilla, attempted a torpedo attack against the British cruisers, but was hit by British shells, jamming her rudder, which caused V69 to collide with G41, badly damaging both ships, although both survived. The flotilla managed to break contact under the cover of smoke screens, but S50 lost contact with the rest of the Flotilla. Her captain decided to proceed independently to Zeebrugge, but ran into four British destroyers (Milne, Simoom, Starfish and Surprise) off the Schouwen Bank shortly after 05:00 CET. In an exchange of gunfire, S50 hit Simoom several times and was herself hit by British shells before torpedoing and badly damaging Simoom. The remaining British ships still blocked S50's course to Zeebrugge, and S50 retired to the east and returned to Germany. Simoom was scuttled by Nimrod later that day.

In October 1917, Germany launched Operation Albion, an invasion of islands in the West Estonian archipelago to secure the left flank of the German Army following the German capture of Riga. The Germans assembled a powerful naval force to support the operation, reinforced by forces detached from the High Seas Fleet, including the 6th Torpedo Boat Flotilla. S50 carried out operations in Tagga Bay in support of Operation Albion on 14 October.

After the end of hostilities, S50 was interned at Scapa Flow. On 21 June 1919, the German fleet at Scapa, including S50, was scuttled by its crews. S50 was raised in October 1924 and scrapped the next year at Stranraer.
