= Friedrich Krupp Germaniawerft =

Former German shipbuilding company

- Industry: Shipbuilding
- Founded: 1867
- Defunct: 1945
- Fate: Dismantled after World War II; re-activated as Howaldtswerke-Deutsche Werft Kiel Shipyards ~1968
- Headquarters: Kiel, Germany
- Products: Merchant ships Warships; U-boats
- Number of employees: 10,000
- Parent: Krupp (After 1896)

Friedrich Krupp Germaniawerft (often just called Germaniawerft, "Germania shipyard") was a German shipbuilding company, located in Kiel harbour. It was one of the largest builders of U-boats for the Kaiserliche Marine in World War I and the Kriegsmarine in World War II. The company was founded in 1867. In 1879, it went bankrupt, was bought by Friedrich Krupp who sought to build warships. Before WWl, he built battleships for the Kaiserliche Marine: SMS Posen; SMS Prinzregent Luitpold;, SMS Kronprinz; SMS Sachsen. 84 U-boats were built in the shipyard during the war. After the war it returned to building yachts and transports.

== History ==
The company was founded in 1867 by Lloyd Foster, as the Norddeutsche Schiffbau-Gesellschaft, in the town of Gaarden, near Kiel. The idea of the company was to construct war and merchant ships. In 1876 the company built the personal yacht of Kaiser Wilhelm II, the SMY Hohenzollern.

The company went bankrupt in 1879 and had to be sold and became property of the Märkisch-Schlesischen Maschinenbau und Hütten-Aktiengesellschaft. They had constructed steam engines in Berlin since 1822. A few years later this company also got in trouble and in late 1882 a new company was founded, the Schiff- und Maschinenbau-Actien-Gesellschaft Germania.

A few more warships were constructed and the company also had a very good reputation concerning the construction of torpedo boats. However the financial problems were never far away and by the end of August 1896 Krupp took over, as they were very interested in building warships themselves. Between 1898 and 1902 the company doubled its surface and new and large slips were constructed. In 1902 the company changed name and became the Friedrich Krupp Germaniawerft.

In 1908, Germaniawerft built the schooner Germania for Gustav Krupp von Bohlen und Halbach, based on a design from Max Oertz. It was the first yacht of its size built in Germany. In the period preceding World War I, it also built a number of battleships for the Kaiserliche Marine, including SMS Posen, SMS Prinzregent Luitpold, SMS Kronprinz and SMS Sachsen. During the First World War, the company turned to building U-boats. A total of 84 U-boats were delivered to the Kaiserliche Marine.

Afterwards, it returned to its original vocation, including building the steel-hulled barque Magdalene Vinnen II, now STS Sedov and the largest traditional sailing ship still afloat.

During World War II, the Germaniawerft was one of the most important suppliers of the Kriegsmarine, because of its proximity to German naval facilities in Kiel. Over the course of the war, the company completed 131 U-boats (types II, VII, XB, XIV, XVII, and XXIII). The Kriegsmarine had in total ordered 240 U-boats. In 1944, the shipyard had over 10,000 employees, of which roughly 11% were forced labourers.

On 26 April 1945, the last U-boat built in the Germaniawerft was launched, U-4714. The war ended before it could enter into service. The most famous U-boats built at the Germaniawerft are probably U-47, which was commanded by Günther Prien during his sinking of HMS Royal Oak in 1940, and U-96, which formed the basis of Lothar-Günther Buchheim's novel Das Boot.

After the war, the partially ruined shipyard was one of the first facilities dismantled by the victorious Allies. The population of heavily bombed Kiel protested furiously this decision, but to no avail. The site was broken up and not rebuilt. In the late 1960s, the grounds were purchased by Howaldtswerke-Deutsche Werft as a submarine-building shipyard. As of 2015, submarines are being built at the site.

== Ships built by Germaniawerft (selection) ==
=== Civilian ships ===
==== Merchant ships ====
- Mary (1920), schooner, later museum ship Carthaginian II at Lahaina, Maui, Hawaii, scuttled in 2005
- Magadelene Vinnen II (1921), 4-masted barque, today Russian sail training ship STS Sedov
- Adolf Vinnen, 5-masted barquentine that sank on her maiden voyage.

==== Yachts ====
- Vanadis a/k/a Lady Hutton (1924)
- Coronet (1928), during World War II patrol boat USS Opal (PYc-8)
- Nourmahal (1928)
- Haida (1929), during World War II patrol boat USS Argus (PY-14)
- Orion (1929), later gunboat USS Vixen (PG-53) and cruise ship Regina Maris
- Etak (1930)
- Talitha G (ex-Reveler) (1930)
- Santa Maria Del Mare (ex-Vita) (1931)
- Alva (1931), later USS Plymouth (PG-57)
- Hussar II (1931), later Sea Cloud

=== Naval ships ===
==== Battleships ====
- SMS Wörth (1890)
- SMS Kaiser Wilhelm der Grosse (1898)
- SMS Zähringen (1899)
- SMS Braunschweig (1901)
- SMS Hessen (1902)
- SMS Deutschland (1904) (1904)
- SMS Posen (1907)
- SMS Prinzregent Luitpold (1910)
- SMS Kronprinz (1914) (1911)
- SMS Sachsen (1916) (1914)

==== Cruisers ====
- SMS Kaiserin Augusta (1892)
- SMS Karlsruhe (1912)
- Prinz Eugen (1936)

==== Destroyers ====
- Destroyers Z.9 - Z.13 (Type Zerstörer 1934A)
- Destroyers Z.37 - Z.39 (Type Zerstörer 1936A (Mob))

==== Submarines (U-boats) ====
- Forel (Imperial Russian Navy)
- Karp-class submarine (Imperial Russian Navy)
- A-class submarines (Royal Norwegian Navy)
- U-3-class submarines (Austro-Hungarian Navy)
- U 1
- Type U 5 submarines
- U 16
- Type U 23 submarines
- Type U 31 submarines
- Type U 51 submarines
- Type U 63 submarines
- Type U 66 submarines
- Type U 81 submarines
- Type U 93 submarines
- Type U 139 submarines
- Type U 142 submarines
- Type UB I submarines
- Type UB III submarines
- Type UC II submarines
- Type II submarines
- Type VII submarines
- Type XB submarines
- Type XIV submarines
- Type XVII submarines
- Type XXIII submarines

==== Torpedo boats ====
- SMS G37
- SMS G38
- SMS G39
- SMS G40
- SMS G41
- SMS G42
- SMS G85

==== Minelayers ====
- Nusret, now museum ship in Mersin, Turkey
