= HMS Paragon (1913) =

Acasta-class destroyer

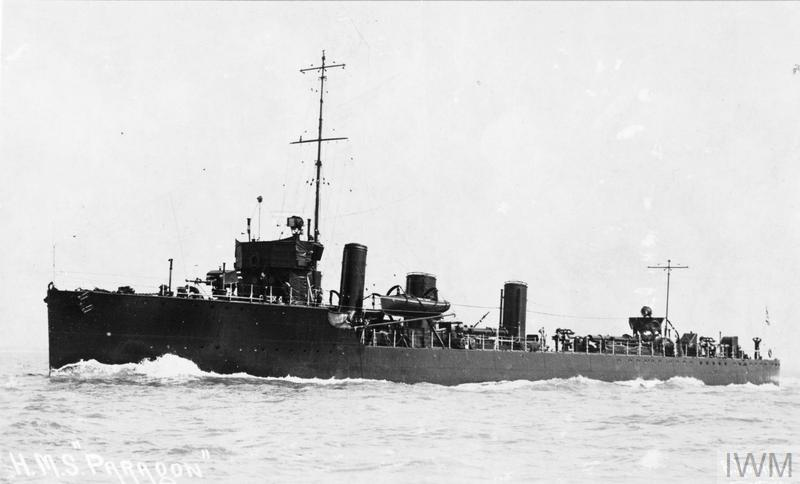
- Paragon

History

United Kingdom
- Name: Paragon
- Builder: John I. Thornycroft & Company, Woolston
- Launched: 21 February 1913
- Fate: Sunk, 17 March 1917

General characteristics
- Class & type: Acasta-class destroyer
- Displacement: 917 long tons (932 t)
- Length: 265 ft (80.8 m)
- Beam: 26 ft 6 in (8.1 m)
- Installed power: Yarrow boilers; 22,500 ihp (16,800 kW)
- Propulsion: 2 shafts; 2 steam turbines
- Speed: 29 knots (54 km/h; 33 mph)
- Complement: 75
- Armament: 3 × QF 4 in (102 mm) guns; 1 × 2 pdr (40 mm (1.6 in)) AA gun; 2 × single tubes for 21 in (533 mm) torpedoes

HMS Paragon was an Acasta-class destroyer that served in the Royal Navy during the First World War. She was launched in 1913, and joined the 4th Destroyer Flotilla upon completion, becoming one of the 21 destroyers in that unit. Initially, the flotilla served with the Grand Fleet, but Paragon was not present for the Battle of Jutland. The flotilla moved to the Humber in July 1916. Here, they were responsible for the merchant ships sailing down Britain's East Coast to London. Five ships from the flotilla, including Paragon, were transferred from the 4th Destroyer Flotilla to the 6th over the winter of 1916-1917, thereby joining the Dover Patrol.

Paragon was one of four destroyers sent out to patrol the Dover barrage on the night of 17th March 1917. The ships patrolled individually, despite intelligence that a large German raid was expected. Paragon was torpedoed whilst challenging the lead German destroyer of a group of seven. She sank after a short action. This was the last in a sequence of losses that called into question the effectiveness of the Dover Patrol's commander, Vice-Admiral Sir Reginald Bacon. After Paragon's sinking he was given direct orders to change his tactical arrangements in a way that he had previously resisted doing. This immediately produced better results, with the Royal Navy regaining the initiative in the Straits of Dover.

== Dover patrol ==
The Dover patrol was tasked with preventing German submarines from transiting through the Straits of Dover into the English Channel, stopping merchant ships reaching Germany and escorting troopships to and from France. The first of these tasks involved a barrage of anti-submarine nets and deep-moored mines. The combination of the two was intended to force submarines to travel on the surface. In daytime, the barrage was patrolled by airships and at night, by destroyers and armed trawlers and drifters.

In October 1916, the German Flanders flotilla (based in Ostend and Zeebrugge) was temporarily reinforced with an extra 20 destroyers of the 3rd and 9th torpedo boat flotillas. This enabled them to make successful attacks on the Dover Patrol, with a raid on the ships doing maintenance work on the anti-submarine barrage on 26 October. HMS Flirt was sunk and three other Royal Navy destroyers seriously damaged. Concurrently, German submarines were still able to travel through the Straits of Dover, as was evidenced by the loss of British ships in the English Channel.

With these two failures in mind, the Dover Patrol was reinforced with a further five destroyers, one of which was Paragon, arriving on 21 November 1916. On 22 January 1917, the German's Flanders flotilla was again reinforced, this time by the 6th Torpedo Boat Flotilla, equipped with fast and heavily armed Großes Torpedoboot destroyers.

The Dover Patrol was commanded by Vice-Admiral Sir Reginald Bacon. A technical expert on ordnance, he lacked any experience of operations at sea.

== Final action ==
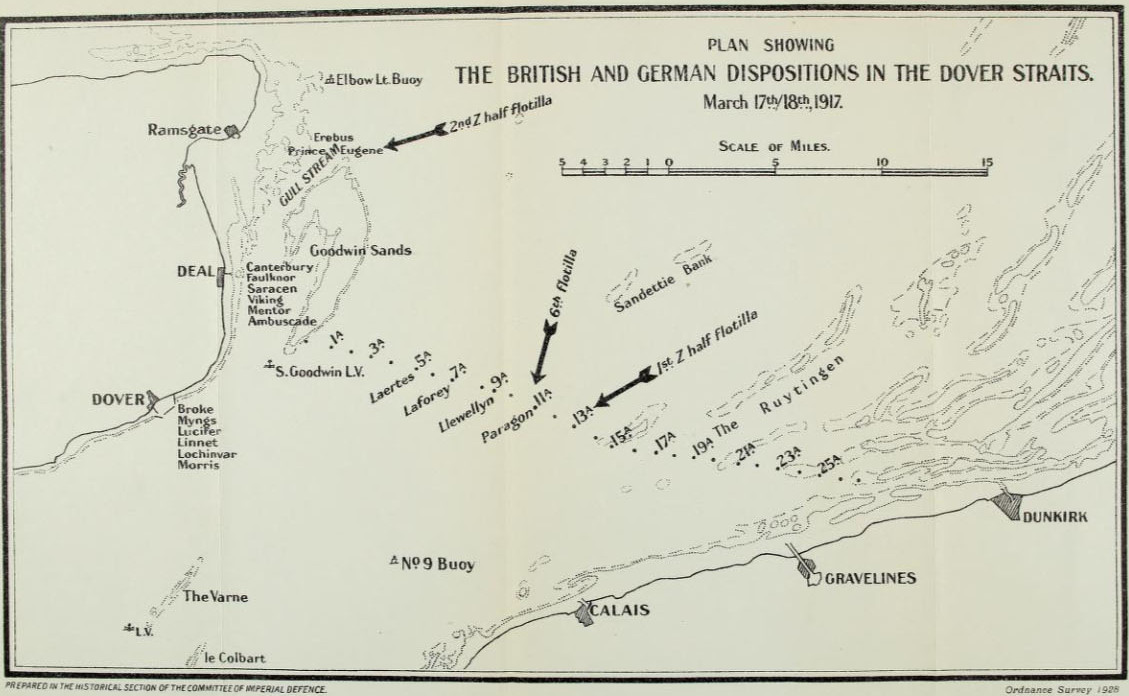
British and German Dispositions in the Dover Straits 17/18 March 1917

On 17 March 1917, Royal Navy signals intelligence suggested that German Naval vessels were moving in the southern part of the North Sea. Bacon was informed, but he did not modify his plans for the night's patrols. It appears that he did not warn the captains of any of the four ships due to make those patrols. His thinking was that they would patrol the barrage line individually and the large reserve force anchored in the Downs would be sent out if any individual ship met the enemy. Paragon was one of the four destroyers sent out to patrol the barrage.

The German ship movements were the preparations for a large raid on the Dover Patrol. Fourteen destroyers were to attack the barrage patrol while a further four were to raid ships in the Downs. In the dark and misty night, seven German destroyers were on a converging course with the south-eastern end of the patrol line: Paragon's position. The German ships were not displaying the British recognition, but, fearful of a friendly fire incident, Paragon sent a challenge with a signal lamp. A torpedo from SMS S49 hit Paragon in the forward boiler room before the challenge signal had been completed. Four of the German ships misunderstood the movements of SMS S49 and became separated from the others; they returned to Ostend to avoid becoming involved in a friendly fire incident. The remaining three opened fire on Paragon. Despite clearly being in a sinking condition, her guns were able briefly to return fire and a torpedo was launched at SMS G87, hit, but failed to explode. A survivor reported that the forward part of Paragon's hull was "completely gone". Shells hit an oil tank, leaving the ship ablaze and a second torpedo hit in the region of the engine room. Her depth charges exploded as the after part of the ship went down, killing and wounding some of the survivors. The remaining central part of the hull was the last to sink – some eight minutes after the start of the action.

Two of the other destroyers on the patrol line were aware that something had happened to their southeast. HMS Llewellyn reported heavy firing by radio to Dover; HMS Laforey heard an explosion which they presumed to be a mine. Both ships went to investigate and started rescuing survivors when they arrived on the scene. Almost immediately, Llewellyn was hit by a torpedo in the bows, but neither British ship saw the German destroyers. Laforey's captain concluded that the torpedoes had come from a submarine. The remaining destroyer in the patrol line, HMS Laertes, heard the radio reports and steamed at full speed to the location of the other ships, nearly engaging Llewellyn by mistake on arrival. About 40 minutes after the sinking, based on radio reports of a German submarine, Bacon ordered the three remaining destroyers to withdraw from the area. He also cancelled the order for his reserves (that were anchored in the Downs) to proceed into the Straits of Dover and instead sent out two anti-submarine sloops. At this stage, only two of Paragon's survivors had been rescued. The three German destroyers involved in the action quietly left the scene and returned to port.

Nearly an hour after the British destroyers had been recalled from the area, Bacon understood that the two rescued survivors were giving an account of an action with German destroyers. Belatedly, Bacon ordered the barrage motor launches to pick up survivors. Only a further eight men were recovered at this late stage, one of whom died of his wounds the next day. Paragon had been carrying 85 men (more than the usual 77). Of these, 69 had gone down with the ship and sixteen had abandoned.

== Aftermath of sinking ==
The loss of Paragon was one in a sequence of failures by the Royal Navy in the Straits of Dover. Bacon seemed not to understand the tactical folly of sending individual destroyers out to meet concentrated forces of German ships. As a result of this latest loss, he was ordered to ensure that when enemy destroyer raids were expected, the ships under his command were to sail in company. Consequently, the next German raid of six destroyers, on 21 April 1917, was met with HMS Broke and Swift. Though both British ships received substantial damage, two German destroyers were sunk in this action. This caused the German navy to pause destroyer raids in the Straits of Dover for several months.

The Admiralty's loss of confidence in Bacon also called into question his tactics for preventing U-boats from passing through the barrage into the English Channel. In November 1917, Bacon resisted the Admiralty's wish to illuminate the barrage at night, so forcing submarines to dive in the region where they might hit a mine. Bacon had to be given a direct order to do this, and a U-boat was sunk on the first night that the illumination was used.
