= SMS G41 =

History

German Empire
- Ordered: 1914 Peacetime order
- Builder: Germaniawerft, Kiel, Germany
- Launched: 24 April 1915
- Commissioned: 14 October 1915
- Fate: Scuttled, 3 October 1918

General characteristics
- Class & type: V25-class torpedo boat
- Displacement: 1,147 t (1,129 long tons)
- Length: 83.0 m (272 ft 4 in)
- Beam: 8.4 m (27 ft 7 in)
- Draft: 3.4 m (11 ft 2 in)
- Installed power: 24,000 PS (24,000 shp; 18,000 kW)
- Propulsion: 3 × water tube boilers; 2 × Germania Steam Turbines
- Speed: 33.5 kn (62.0 km/h; 38.6 mph)
- Range: 1,950 nmi (3,610 km; 2,240 mi) at 17 kn (31 km/h; 20 mph)
- Complement: 83 officers and sailors
- Armament: 3 × 8.8 cm (3.5 in) L/45 guns; 6 × 500 mm torpedo tubes; 24 mines

SMS G41 was a 1913 Type Large Torpedo Boat (Großes Torpedoboot) of the Imperial German Navy during World War I, and the 17th ship of her class.

== Construction ==
Built by Germaniawerft in Kiel, Germany, G41 was launched on 24 April 1915 and commissioned on 14 October 1915. The "G" in G41 refers to the shipyard at which she was constructed.

G41 was 83.0 metres (272 ft 4 in) long overall and 82.2 metres (269 ft 8 in) at the waterline, with a beam of 8.4 metres (27 ft 7 in) and a draft of 3.4 metres (11 ft 2 in). Displacement was 960 tonnes (940 long tons) normal and 1,147 tonnes (1,129 long tons) deep load. Three oil-fired water-tube boilers fed steam to 2 sets of Germania steam turbines rated at 24,000 metric horsepower (24,000 shp; 18,000 kW), giving a speed of 33.5 knots (62.0 km/h; 38.6 mph). 326 tonnes (321 long tons) of fuel oil was carried, giving a range of 1,950 nautical miles (3,610 km; 2,240 mi) at 17 knots (31 km/h; 20 mph).

Armament consisted of three 8.8 cm SK L/45 naval guns in single mounts, together with six 50 cm (19.7 in) torpedo tubes with two fixed single tubes forward and 2 twin mounts aft. Up to 24 mines could be carried. The ship had a complement of 87 officers and men.

== Service ==
On 24 April 1916, G41 participated in the shore bombardment of Yarmouth and Lowestoft, on the southeastern tip of Great Britain. G41 was assigned to Scouting Division II as leader of Torpedo Boat Flotilla VI in this battle. The overall goal of this action was to lure Royal Navy capital ships out to sea where the German fleet was massed in ambush. A vanguard of smaller, faster vessels like G41 would be sent in as bait to bombard the English coastline and hopefully provoke a British response. The German strike force's element of surprise was lost however when the battlecruiser Seydlitz struck a mine and had to withdraw. The strike force nevertheless continued the mission and bombarded Yarmouth and Lowestoft killing four British civilians and wounding 19. Four British light cruisers and 12 destroyers subsequently gave chase to the fleeing Germans but turned back upon sighting the massed German fleet. During this action, G41 is credited with sinking a British Naval trawler, the King Stephen, rescuing her crew and taking them prisoner.

G41 took part at the Battle of Jutland on 31 May – 1 June 1916, leading the 6th Torpedo Boat Flotilla, in support of the German Battlecruisers. G41 led a torpedo attack by three more torpedo boats from the 6th Flotilla, V44, G86 and G87, on British battlecruisers during the "Run to the South". In total, seven torpedoes were launched, two from G41, none of which hit their targets. Later during the day, these four torpedo boats, together with the cruiser Regensburg and several other destroyers, engaged British destroyers supporting the 3rd Battlecruiser Squadron. The British destroyer Shark was badly damaged during this engagement. From about 20:15 CET (19:15 GMT), G41 took part in a large-scale torpedo attack on the British fleet in order to cover the outnumber German battleship's turn to west. G41 launched two torpedoes, which as with all the torpedoes launched in this attack, missed, and was struck on the forecastle by a British 6-inch (152 mm) shell, which wounded five men and caused splinter damage which reduced G41's speed to 25 knots (46 km/h; 29 mph). G41 escaped further damage by retiring behind a smoke-screen.

On 22 January 1917, 11 torpedo boats of the 6th Torpedo Boat Flotilla, including G41 left Helgoland to reinforce the German torpedo forces in Flanders. The British Admiralty knew about this transfer due to codebreaking by Room 40, and ordered the Harwich Force of cruisers and destroyers to intercept the German torpedo boats. During the night of 22–23 January, the 6th Flotilla encountered three British light cruisers (Aurora, Conquest and Centaur). The Germans attempted a torpedo attack against the British cruisers, but were driven off by heavy fire and broke off the attack behind a smoke-screen. V69, leader of the flotilla, and the only torpedo boat to succeed in launching any torpedoes, was hit by three shells, one of which jammed her rudder, forcing her to move in a circle. G41 collided with V69 twice in the resulting confusion, with the second collision caused one of V69's torpedoes to explode. Both torpedo boats were badly damaged as a result of the collisions, and G41 was hit two more times by British shells, knocking out the ship's aft gun and forward torpedo tubes before managing to lose the chasing British cruisers in the smoke. G41 managed to reach Zeebrugge via Dutch territorial waters, while V69 made for IJmuiden in the Netherlands, where she was repaired, returning to Germany on 12 February.

On the night of 4/5 June 1917, the British Dover Patrol bombarded Ostend, using the monitors Erebus and Terror. G41 was in dry-dock at Ostend at the time and was seriously damaged by British shells. During 1918, the British carried out a heavy campaign of minelaying off the Flanders coast, which increasingly resulted in German torpedo boats being diverted to minesweeping to allow Flanders-based U-boats to continue operations. On 11 August, G41 set off a magnetic mine and was heavily damaged, having to be towed back to port. By October 1918, Allied advances made use of the German-occupied ports on the Flanders coast untenable, and it was decided to evacuate. G41, under repair, was unable to leave, and was scuttled in the Bruges–Ghent canal on 3 October 1918.
