= HMS Laverock =

Destroyer of the Royal Navy

History

United Kingdom
- Name: HMS Laverock
- Builder: Yarrow & Company
- Laid down: 24 July 1912
- Launched: 19 November 1913
- Completed: October 1914
- Fate: Sold and broken up May 1921

General characteristics
- Class & type: Laforey-class destroyer
- Displacement: 965–1,010 long tons (980–1,026 t) normal; 1,150–1,300 long tons (1,170–1,320 t) deep load
- Length: 268 ft 10 in (81.94 m) oa
- Beam: 27 ft 8 in (8.43 m)
- Draught: 10 ft 6 in (3.20 m)
- Installed power: 24,500 shp (18,300 kW)
- Propulsion: 3 × Yarrow boilers, Parsons steam turbines, 2 shafts
- Speed: 29 kn (54 km/h; 33 mph)
- Complement: 73
- Armament: 3 × QF 4-inch (101.6 mm) Mk IV guns; 1 × QF 2 pdr pom-pom Mk. II; 2 × twin tubes for 21 in torpedoes

HMS Laverock was a Laforey-class destroyer of the Royal Navy. She was launched in 1913 and entered service in October 1914. Laverock served through the First World War, operating with the Harwich Force and in the English Channel. She was sold for scrap in 1921.

== Construction and design ==
The British Admiralty ordered 20 L-class (later to become the Laforey-class) destroyers as part of the 1912–1913 shipbuilding programme for the Royal Navy. An initial order for 16 destroyers was placed on 29 March 1912, with four more ordered from Yarrow & Company (to become Landrail and Laverock) and two from Beardmore (Lennox and Llewelyn) later in the year. (Note: Two more L-class destroyers were ordered from Beardmore in November 1914 as part of the 1st Emergency War Programme.)

The ship was laid down at Yarrow's Scotstoun, Glasgow shipyard on 24 July 1912 as Hereward but on 30 September 1913, the Admiralty ordered that the L-class be renamed with names beginning with the letter "L", and Hereward was renamed Laverock. Laverock was launched on 19 November 1913. The ship was undergoing final acceptance trials on 1 March 1914 when she ran aground in the Firth of Clyde near Skelmorlie, suffering a 45 ft (14 m) gash on her port side, and was not refloated until 29 March. She was completed in October 1914.

Laverock was 268 feet 10 inches (81.94 m) long overall and 260 feet 0 inches (79.25 m) between perpendiculars, with a beam of 27 feet 8 inches (8.43 m) and a draught of 10 feet 10 inches (3.30 m). Displacement of the L-class was 965–1,010 long tons (980–1,026 t) normal and 1,150–1,300 long tons (1,170–1,320 t) deep load. (Note: Jane's lists Laverock as having a displacement of 994 long tons (1,010 t).) Three Yarrow boilers fed steam to direct-drive Parsons steam turbines which drove two propeller shafts. The machinery was rated at 24,500 shaft horsepower (18,300 kW), giving a design speed of 29 knots (54 km/h; 33 mph). Two funnels were fitted. The ship's main gun armament consisted of three QF 4 in (102 mm) Mk IV guns on the ship's centreline, with 120 rounds per gun, supplemented by a .303 in (7.7 mm) Maxim machine gun. The ship carried two twin 21 inch (533 mm) torpedo tubes, and was fitted with rails to carry four Vickers Elia Mk IV naval mines, although these rails were never used. A single QF 2-pounder pom-pom Mk. II gun was fitted from 1916. The ship had a complement of 73 officers and men.

== Service ==
On commissioning Laverock joined the 3rd Destroyer Flotilla, part of the Harwich Force, which was under the overall command of Commodore Reginald Tyrwhitt. On 2 November 1914, Laverock accompanied the light cruiser Aurora and the destroyers Lark and Lawford on an anti-submarine patrol in the area of the Broad Fourteens. As their course took them between British and German minefields, the ships encountered many stray floating mines, destroying 15 of them. The patrol was still at sea when German cruisers and battlecruisers carried out a raid on Yarmouth the next morning, and was ordered to Yarmouth to attempt to intercept the German force. The Germans, however, managed to escape the British forces. On 1 March 1915, Laverock was one of 4 destroyers of the 3rd Flotilla that were ordered to Avonmouth for escort duties, and in particular to escort troop transports on the first part of their journey to the Mediterranean. In October 1915 the 3rd Destroyer Flotilla was renumbered the 9th Destroyer Flotilla, still remaining part of the Harwich Force, with Laverock remaining part of the new formation.

Laverock was part of the escort for the seaplane carrier HMS Vindex when Vindex, covered by most of the Harwich Force, launched an unsuccessful air attack against a German Zeppelin base believed to be at Hoyer in Schleswig-Holstein on 25–26 March 1916. Only two out of five seaplanes dispatched returned, reporting that the Zeppelin base was in fact at Tondern, but that they were unable to attack the base. Tyrwhitt sent several of his destroyers, including Laverock to search for the missing seaplanes. No sign of the missing seaplanes were found (they had, in fact, ditched due to engine trouble, and their crews captured by the Germans) but the force did encounter two German patrol boats which they sank. When picking up survivors from the two patrol boats, Laverock rammed the destroyer Medusa. While damage to Laverock was confined to her bows, Medusa had been holed in her engine room and was taken in tow by the Flotilla leader Lightfoot, but due to the severe weather, Medusa eventually had to be scuttled. During the return journey of Tyrwhitt's force, the cruisers Cleopatra and Undaunted also collided, badly damaging Undaunted, shortly after Cleopatra rammed and sunk the German destroyer G194.

The Harwich Force was held back as a reserve during the Battle of Jutland on 31 May–1 June 1916, but when the battleship Marlborough was damaged by a German torpedo, Laverock was one of eight destroyers of the Harwich Force sent to escort the crippled battleship to the Humber. On 13 August 1916, Laverock, along with Lance and Lassoo was part of the escort of a Harwich–Holland convoy when Lassoo struck a mine, killing six of her crew. (Note: Some sources state that Lassoo was torpedoed by the German submarine UB-10.) Believing that Lassoo had been torpedoed, the other destroyers deployed their anti-submarine explosive sweeps. Laverock's sweep detonated, but no debris came up.

Early in 1917, the 9th Destroyer Flotilla was split up, with the newer destroyers joining the 10th Destroyer Flotilla, and the L-class ships being dispersed to different units, with Laverock joining the Dover Patrol. (Note: Bacon states that Laverock joined the Dover Patrol on 5 March 1917, after her engagement with German torpedo boats in the English Channel on 24/25 February.) On the night of 24/25 February 1917, Laverock was one of five destroyers (the others were Lance, Landrail, Lochinvar and Laurel) patrolling the Dover Straits to guard against attack by German torpedo boats, while further forces of destroyers and cruisers were on standby in the Downs and at Dover. That night, German torpedo boats a raid against the Dover Barrage and Allied shipping in the Dover Straits, with one flotilla attacking the Barrage and a half flotilla of torpedo boats operating off the Kent coast. The southern German force, the 6th Flotilla, comprising six torpedo boats (equivalent to Royal Navy destroyers) encountered Laverock and engaged the British destroyer with gunfire and at least two torpedoes, one of which struck Laverock but did not detonate. Laverock set out in pursuit of the German ships, which broke contact and returned to base, their commander believing that he was engaged with several destroyers and that his planned raid on Dover was no longer possible. The second German group of five torpedo boats, was spotted near the North entrance to the Downs, and shelled Margate and Westgate-on-Sea prior to returning to base.

On 18 April 1917, Laverock left the 6th Flotilla, joining the 4th Flotilla, now based at Devonport and employed on convoy escort duties. Laverock remained part of the 4th Flotilla at the end of the war on 11 November 1918.

== Disposal ==
Laverock was laid up in reserve at the Nore by March 1919, and was sold for scrap to Thos. W. Ward's Grays shipbreaking yard on 9 May 1921.

== Pennant Numbers ==
Pennant Number	Date
H53	1914
