= V25-class torpedo boat =

Imperial German torpedo boat class

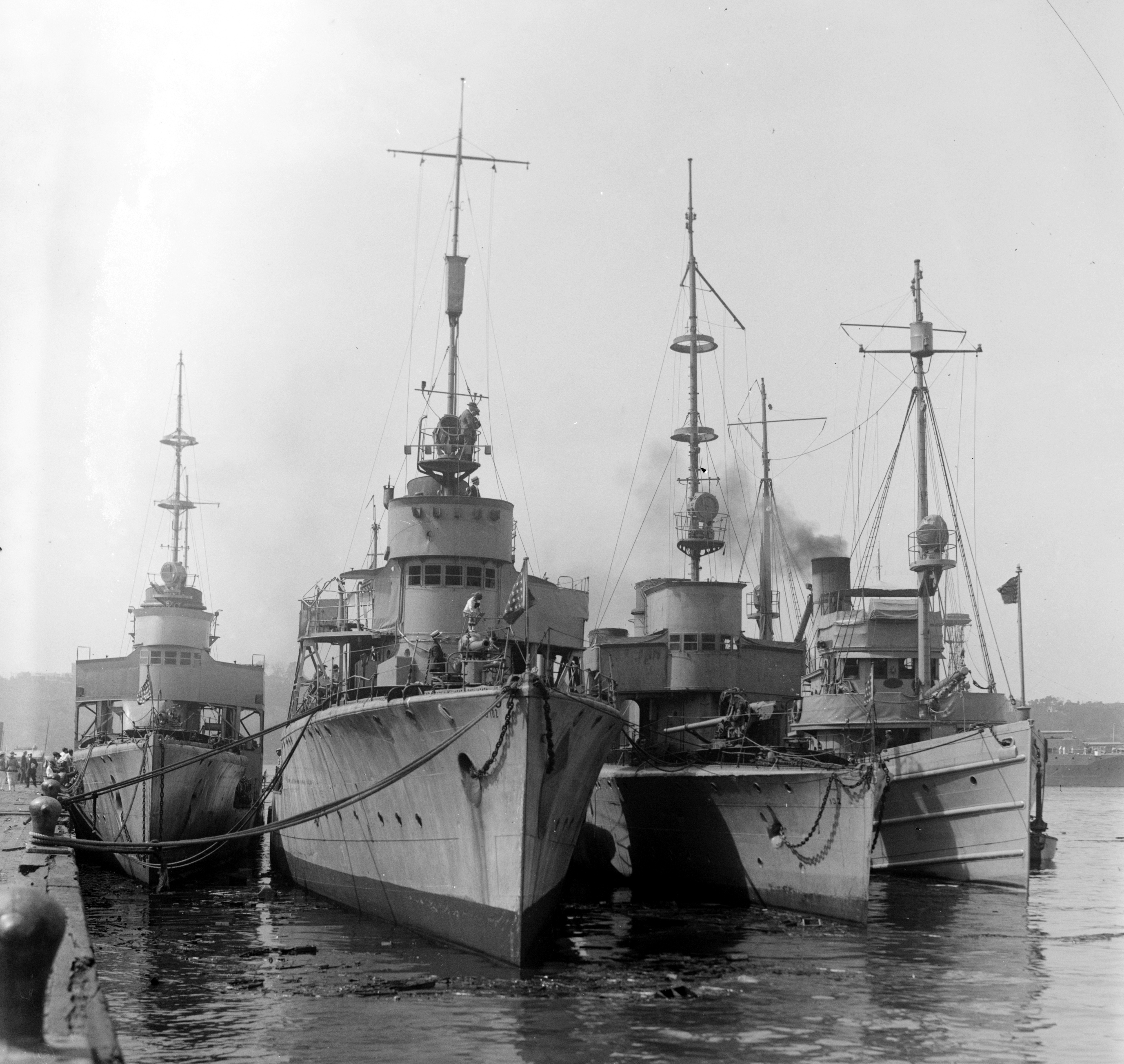
- German torpedo boats in US after World War I. First ship on left is V43 of the Großes Torpedoboot 1913 class

Class overview
- Operators: Imperial German Navy
- Planned: 71
- Completed: 71
- Lost: 62
- Scrapped: 6

General characteristics
- Type: Torpedo boat
- Displacement: 975 tonnes (960 long tons)
- Length: 84.65 m (277 ft 9 in)
- Beam: 8.33 m (27 ft 4 in)
- Draught: 3.40 m (11 ft 2 in)
- Complement: 87
- Armament: 3 × 8.8 cm (3.46 in) L/45 guns; 6 × 50 cm (20 in) torpedo tubes; 8 × torpedoes
- Aircraft carried: 1 × floatplane (on V25 briefly)

The V25 class (also known as the Type 1913) was a class of torpedo boat built for the Imperial German Navy (Kaiserliche Marine). It was numerically the largest class ever built for the High Seas Fleet, consisting of 71 ships. Of the class, 32 were sunk during World War I, several to mines in the North Sea and Baltic Sea. Of those that survived the war 29 were scuttled with the German fleet at Scapa Flow, one was destroyed by a mine on the way there, four were given to Britain and were not scuttled while one was given to Italy and France.

== Design ==
=== General characteristics and machinery ===
The boats of the V25 class varied in dimensions, and they gradually increased in size as more vessels were built. The boats were 77.80 to 82.50 meters (255 ft 3 in to 270 ft 8 in) long at the waterline and 78.50 to 83.10 m (257 ft 7 in to 272 ft 8 in) long overall. They had beam of 8.32 to 8.36 m (27 ft 4 in to 27 ft 5 in) and a draft of 2.80 to 3.90 m (9 ft 2 in to 12 ft 10 in). Displacement ranged from 812 to 960 metric tons (799 to 945 long tons) as designed and from 971 to 1,188 t (956 to 1,169 long tons) at full load. They had a crew of three officers and eighty enlisted, though some of the boats had an additional two to four sailors. When serving as half-flotilla flagships, the boats would have a flotilla leader's staff of three officers and thirteen to fifteen enlisted men in addition to the standard crew.

The V25-class boats were propelled by a pair of steam turbines manufactured by the shipyard that built each boat. Steam was provided by three oil-fired water-tube boilers. These were the first German torpedo boats to be fueled only by oil, with no provision for coal. The boats' engines were rated at 33.5 to 34.5 knots (62.0 to 63.9 km/h; 38.6 to 39.7 mph) from 24,000 shaft horsepower (18,000 kW), though most of the ships significantly exceeded these figures, in some cases by almost three knots. The boats had storage capacity for 220 to 338 t (217 to 333 long tons; 243 to 373 short tons) of fuel oil. As a result, cruising radius varied significantly, from 1,080 to 1,810 nautical miles (2,000 to 3,350 km; 1,240 to 2,080 mi) at 20 knots (37 km/h; 23 mph), with the first dozen boats having the least endurance. Each vessel was equipped with a pair of 28 kilowatts (38 hp) 110-Volt turbo-generators for electrical power. Steering was controlled with a pair of rudders; the primary at the stern, and a secondary, retractable rudder located in the bow.

=== Armament ===
Each boat initially carried three 8.8 cm (3.5 in) SK L/45 guns in single mounts, one forward and two aft, all on the centerline. Each gun was supplied with 100 rounds of ammunition. Most of the boats later had these guns replaced with three much more powerful 10.5 cm (4.1 in) SK L/45 guns, with 70 shells per gun. All of the boats carried six 50 cm (20 in) torpedo tubes with eight torpedoes as their primary offensive armament. They were also equipped to lay naval mines, and each carried twenty-four mines. During World War I, V25 briefly had her center gun removed to make room for a Friedrichshafen FF.33 seaplane.

== Ships ==
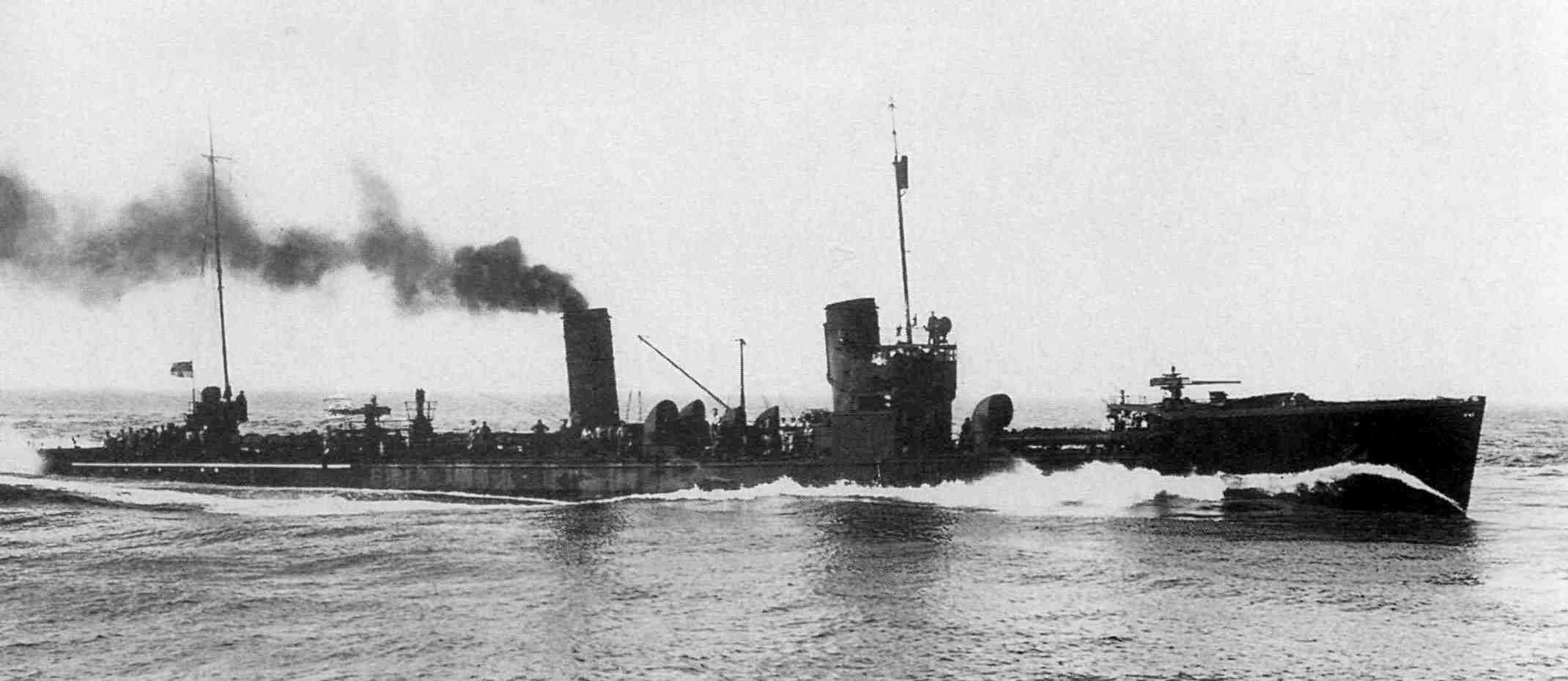
SMS V43

The ships were numbered according to the yard which built them. There were minor differences between each yard series, so some references list each such series as a separate type. Strictly speaking, the 1913 series consisted only of V25 to V30 and S31 to S36 ships, but the later ones listed here were quite similar, though increasing in displacement. The German practice in peacetime was to build one flotilla of similar ships per fiscal year, hence the name 1913 series. Later ships belonged to the 1914 series (G37 to V84) and 1915 series (G85 to G95). During the war the armament of most of these ships was upgraded, with 8.8 cm guns replaced with 10.5 cm guns.

- V25 to V30, V43 to V48, V69, V71 to V74, V78, and V80 to V82, all built by AG Vulcan at Stettin
- V67, V68, V70, V75, V76, V77, V79, V83 and V85 by AG Vulcan at Hamburg
- G37 to G42, and G85 to G95, built by Germaniawerft at Kiel,
- S31 to S36, and S49 to S66, built by Schichau at Elbing

== Service history ==
Despite the British naval blockade of Germany, many of the ships saw service in the English Channel, the North Sea and especially the Baltic. Some participated in the Battle of Jutland. A total of 32 were lost before the Armistice, including many lost to mines in the Baltic. V43 was scuttled at Scapa Flow but later raised and repaired. She was taken over by the US Navy and commissioned for a brief period in 1920, then sunk as target on 15 July 1921.

Two ships of the class, V44 and V82, were turned over to the Royal Navy following World War I. They were towed to Portsmouth Harbour where they were used for target practice. Subsequently, they were intentionally beached on the southern tip of Whale Island. Their remains are still there today.

== See also ==
- V125-class torpedo boat - a modified design from the 1913 version
