= Dover Barrage =

Underwater blockade of the English Channel against German submarines during WWI

Coordinates: 51°3′N 1°36′E

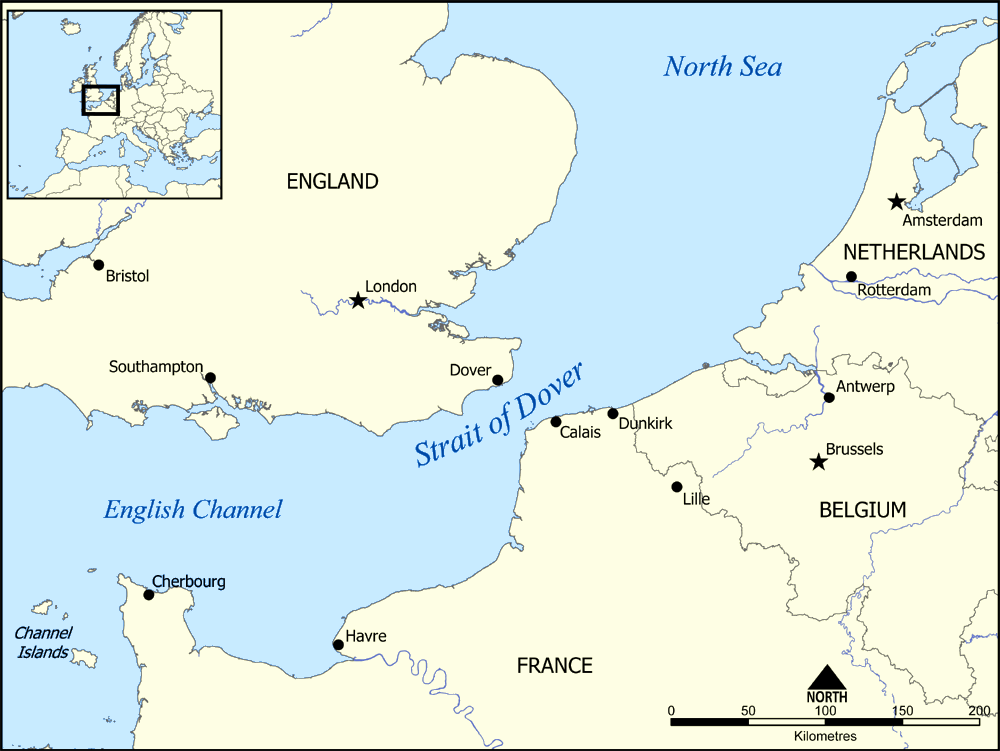
Strait of Dover

The Dover Barrage was an underwater blockade by England of German submarines attempting to use the English Channel during World War I. The barrage consisted of explosive mines and indicator nets. A similar barrage was used in World War II.

== Use in World War I ==
The barrier consisted of minefields laid between Belgium and Dover at the outbreak of war, followed in February 1915 by 25 km of indicator nets, steel netting anchored to the sea bed. The first evidence of effectiveness was on 4 March 1915, when the German U-boat U-8 was taken, caught in the indicator nets. The first stage of the barrage was completed in April 1915 and it was patrolled by ships of the Dover patrol. Both sides initially believed the barrier to be effective and the Germans attributed some submarine losses to it. However, in March 1916, the Germans found their submarines could traverse the Channel on the surface at night. The British moved the barrier to cover Folkestone–Cap Gris-Nez and used new mines and searchlights, effectively closing the Channel to hostile submarines in August 1918. Underwater scanning of the area covered by the Dover Barrage shows the wreck of UB-109 broken in half.

== Use in World War II ==
A mine barrage was also used in Dover during the 1940 Siege of Calais.
