= HMS Conquest (1915) =

Royal Navy C-class light cruiser

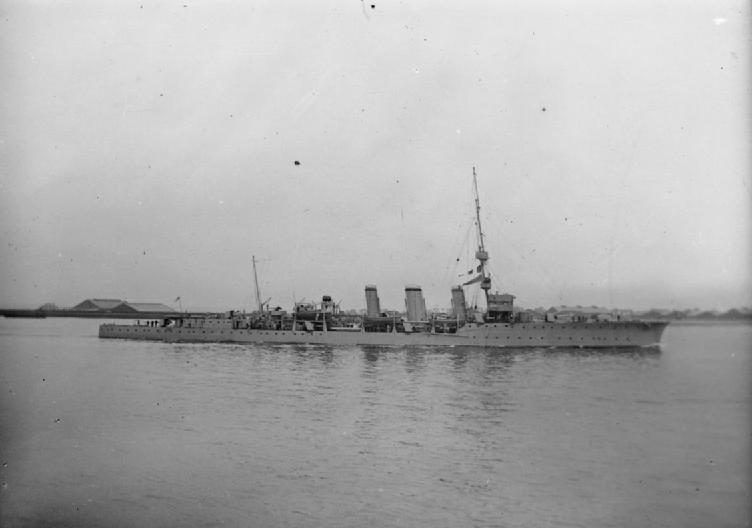
- Conquest during World War I

History

United Kingdom
- Name: Conquest
- Builder: Chatham Dockyard
- Laid down: 3 March 1914
- Launched: 20 January 1915
- Completed: June 1915
- Commissioned: June 1915
- Decommissioned: 13 July 1918
- Recommissioned: February 1922
- Decommissioned: 1930
- Identification: Pennant number: C0 (1914); 48 (Jan 18); 37 (Apr 18); 68 (Nov 19)
- Fate: Sold for scrap, 29 August 1930

General characteristics (as built)
- Class & type: C-class light cruiser
- Displacement: 4,382 long tons (4,452 t) (normal)
- Length: 446 ft (135.9 m) (o/a)
- Beam: 41 ft 6 in (12.6 m)
- Draught: 16 ft (4.9 m) (mean)
- Installed power: 8 × Yarrow boilers; 40,000 shp (30,000 kW)
- Propulsion: 2 × shafts; 2 × steam turbines
- Speed: 28.5 knots (52.8 km/h; 32.8 mph)
- Range: 3,680 nmi (6,820 km; 4,230 mi) at 18 knots (33 km/h; 21 mph)
- Complement: 301
- Armament: 2 × single 6 in (152 mm) guns; 8 × single 4 in (102 mm) guns; 1 × single 6 pdr (2.2 in (57 mm)) AA gun; 2 × twin 21 in (533 mm) torpedo tubes
- Armour: Waterline belt: 1–3 in (25–76 mm); Deck: 1 in (25 mm); Conning tower: 6 in

HMS Conquest was a C-class light cruiser of the Royal Navy that saw service during World War I. She was part of the Caroline group of the C class.

== Design and description ==
The C-class cruisers were intended to escort the fleet and defend it against enemy destroyers attempting to close within torpedo range. Ordered in July–August 1913 as part of the 1913–14 Naval Programme, the Carolines were enlarged and improved versions of the preceding Arethusa-class cruisers. The ships were 446 feet (135.9 m) long overall, with a beam of 41 feet 6 inches (12.6 m) and a mean draught of 16 feet (4.9 m). Conquest displaced 4,382 long tons (4,452 t) at normal load and 4,928 long tons (5,007 t) at deep load. She had a metacentric height of 0.65 ft (0.20 m) at light load and 2.5 ft (0.76 m) at deep load.

The Carolines were powered by four direct-drive Parsons steam turbines, each driving one propeller shaft using steam generated by eight Yarrow boilers. The turbines produced a total of 40,000 shaft horsepower (30,000 kW) which gave them a speed of 28.5 knots (52.8 km/h; 32.8 mph). The ships carried enough fuel oil to give them a range of 3,680 nautical miles (6,820 km; 4,230 mi) at 18 knots (33 km/h; 21 mph). They had a crew of 301 officers and ratings.

The main armament of the Carolines consisted of two BL six-inch (152 mm) Mk XII guns that were mounted on the centreline in the stern, with one gun superfiring over the rearmost gun. Her secondary armament consisted of eight QF four-inch (102 mm) Mk IV guns in single pivot mounts; four on each side, one pair forward of the bridge, another pair abaft it on the forecastle deck and the other two pairs one deck lower amidships. For anti-aircraft defence, the ships were fitted with one QF six-pounder (2.2 in (57 mm)) Hotchkiss gun. They also mounted a pair of twin-tube rotating mounts for 21-inch (533 mm) torpedoes, one on each broadside. The Carolines were protected by a waterline belt amidships that ranged in thickness from 1–3 inches (25–76 mm) and a 1-inch (25 mm) deck. The walls of their conning tower were six inches thick.

=== Wartime modifications ===
Shortly after her completion in June 1915, Conquest's six-pounder anti-aircraft (AA) gun was replaced by an Ordnance QF three-pounder (1.9-inch (47 mm)) Vickers Mk II AA gun. In May 1916 the ship's forward pair of four-inch guns were replaced by another 6-inch gun mounted on the centreline and a QF four-inch Mk V gun replaced her three-pounder AA gun in December. The following year her aftmost four-inch guns were replaced by another pair of 21-inch torpedo mounts. In addition, her pole foremast was replaced by a tripod mast that was fitted with a gunnery director sometime during 1917–1918. An additional six-inch gun was added abaft the funnels in lieu of her forward main-deck four-inch guns between April and August 1918. Conquest's Mk V AA gun was replaced in 1919 by a pair of QF three-inch (76 mm) 20-cwt (Note: "Cwt" is the abbreviation for hundredweight, 20 cwt referring to the weight of the gun.) AA guns abaft the bridge, where the four-inch guns had originally been located. Sometime between 1919 and 1923, the ship received a pair of two-pounder (1.6-inch (40 mm)) Mk II "pom-pom" guns on single mounts. All of these changes adversely affected the ship's stability and the additional 21-inch torpedo tubes and the aft control position were removed by the end of 1921. Conquest lost her midships six-inch gun in 1925.

== Construction and career ==
Constructed by Chatham Dockyard, Conquest was laid down on 3 March 1914, launched on 20 January 1915, and completed in June 1915.

Conquest was commissioned into service in the Royal Navy in June 1915. She was assigned to the 5th Light Cruiser Squadron in Harwich Force, which operated in the North Sea to guard the eastern approaches to the Strait of Dover and English Channel. In August 1915, she was among the ships which took part in the pursuit of the Imperial German Navy auxiliary cruiser Meteor in the North Sea which resulted in Meteor scuttling herself on 9 August 1915. She covered the force that carried out the Royal Naval Air Service seaplane raid on the German Navy airship hangars at Tondern, then in northern Germany, on 24 March 1916. On 28 March 1916 38 men were lost in a snowstorm off Harwich on one of the ship's boats, listed as a whaler, when returning from shore leave. During the Lowestoft Raid – the German naval bombardment of Yarmouth and Lowestoft – on 25 April 1916, German battlecruisers opened fire on Conquest and she suffered a 12-inch (305-mm) shell hit which destroyed her aerials and killed 25 and wounded 13 of her crew, but was able to maintain 20 knots.

Back in service after repairs, Conquest sortied along with much of the rest of Harwich Force and the Grand Fleet in August 1916 in an unsuccessful attempt to bring the German High Seas Fleet to action in the North Sea; while at sea, she opened fire on the German Navy Zeppelin L 13 but was unable to shoot the airship down. In January 1917, she took part in an unsuccessful attempt to attack German destroyers off the coast of Belgium. On 5 June 1917, she and the light cruisers HMS Canterbury and HMS Centaur sank the German torpedo boat S20 in the North Sea near the Schouwen Bank off Zeebrugge, Belgium, during a Royal Navy raid on Ostend, Belgium. She was damaged by a mine in July 1918 and was decommissioned on 13 July 1918 for repairs which lasted through the end of World War I and until April 1919.

=== Postwar ===
After her repairs were complete, Conquest went into the Nore Reserve, and underwent a refit in 1921 while in reserve. She was recommissioned in February 1922 to serve as flagship of the 1st Submarine Flotilla in the Atlantic Fleet, continuing in this capacity until January 1927, when she transferred to the Mediterranean Fleet. She left the Mediterranean in April 1928 and returned to the United Kingdom to enter the commissioned reserve at Portsmouth, in which she remained until 1930.

Conquest was sold on 29 August 1930 to Metal Industries of Rosyth, Scotland, for scrapping. While in the North Sea bound for the shipbreaker's yard under tow off Flamborough Head in bad weather on 26 September 1930 with a skeleton crew of six men on board, her tow line broke, and she was adrift and missing until 28 September 1930, when she was found and her tow to Rosyth resumed.
