= SMS V28 =

History

German Empire
- Name: V28
- Ordered: 1913
- Builder: AG Vulcan, Stettin
- Launched: 9 May 1914
- Commissioned: 22 September 1914

General characteristics
- Displacement: 975 t (960 long tons)
- Length: 78.5 m (257 ft 7 in)
- Beam: 8.33 m (27 ft 4 in)
- Draft: 3.63 m (11 ft 11 in)
- Installed power: 3 × water-tube boilers; 23,500 PS (23,200 shp; 17,300 kW)
- Propulsion: 2 × AEG Vulcan steam turbines
- Speed: 33.5 knots (62.0 km/h; 38.6 mph)
- Range: 1,950 nmi (3,610 km; 2,240 mi) at 17 knots (31 km/h; 20 mph)
- Complement: 83 officers and sailors
- Armament: 3 × 8.8 cm (3.5 in) L/45 guns; 6 × 500 mm (19.7 in) torpedo tubes; 24 mines

SMS V28 (Note: "SMS" stands for "Seiner Majestät Schiff" (transl. His Majesty's Ship)) (Note: The "V" in V28 denoted the shipbuilder who constructed her, in this case AG Vulcan.) was a V25-class torpedo boat of the Imperial German Navy that served during the First World War. The ship was built by AG Vulcan at Stettin in Prussia (now Szczecin in Poland), and was completed in September 1914. The ship took part in the Battle of Dogger Bank, the Battle of the Gulf of Riga in 1915, and the Battle of Jutland on 31 May 1916.

V28 survived the war after which she was surrendered under the Treaty of Versailles and scrapped in 1922.

== Design and construction ==
In 1913, the Imperial German Navy placed orders for 12 high-seas torpedo boats, with six each ordered from AG Vulcan (V25–V30) and Schichau-Werke (S31–S36). (Note: The Imperial German Navy's practice was to split a year's orders into half-flotillas of six torpedo boats from different builders.) While the designs built by each shipyard were broadly similar, they differed from each other in detail, and were significantly larger and more capable than the small torpedo boats built for the German Navy in the last two years.

V28 was 78.5 metres (257 ft 7 in) long overall and 77.8 metres (255 ft 3 in) at the waterline, with a beam of 8.33 metres (27 ft 4 in) and a draft of 3.63 metres (11 ft 11 in). Displacement was 812 tonnes (799 long tons) normal and 975 tonnes (960 long tons) deep load. Three oil-fired water-tube boilers fed steam to 2 sets of AEG-Vulcan steam turbines rated at 23,500 metric horsepower (23,200 shp; 17,300 kW), giving a speed of 33.5 knots (62.0 km/h; 38.6 mph). 225 tonnes (221 long tons) of fuel oil was carried, giving a range of 1,080 nautical miles (2,000 km; 1,240 mi) at 20 knots (37 km/h; 23 mph).

Armament consisted of three 8.8 cm SK L/45 naval guns in single mounts, (Note: SK stood for Schnellfeuerkanone (quick-firing gun).) (Note: In Imperial German Navy gun nomenclature, the L/45 denotes the length of the gun. In this case, the L/45 gun is 45 caliber, meaning that the gun is 45 times as long as it is in diameter.) together with six 50 cm (19.7 in) torpedo tubes with two fixed single tubes forward and 2 twin mounts aft. Up to 24 mines could be carried. The ship had a complement of 83 officers and men.

V28 was laid down as yard number 349 at AG Vulcan's Stettin shipyard, was launched on 9 May 1914 and commissioned on 22 September 1914.

== Service ==
=== 1914–1915 ===
V28 joined the 9th Torpedo Boat Flotilla, serving as the lead boat of the flotilla in October 1914. On 15 December 1914 the German battlecruiser squadron under the command of Franz von Hipper set out on an attack on the British east coast towns of Scarborough, Hartlepool, West Hartlepool and Whitby, with the intent of drawing out parts of the British Grand Fleet where it could be defeated in detail. The 9th Torpedo Boat Flotilla, including V28, was part of the escort for Hipper's heavy ships.

On 14 January 1915, the cruisers Strassburg and Stralsund, escorted by the 9th Torpedo boat Flotilla, led by V28, set out to lay a minefield off the Humber. The weather was extremely poor, with the torpedo-boats struggling in the heavy seas, which partly extinguished their boiler fires, and after the torpedo boats V25 and V26 collided, causing minor damage, the flotilla commander aboard V28 ordered the torpedo boats to turn back, leaving the two cruisers to carry on unescorted. The minefield claimed a British trawler, Windsor, on 22 January. On 21–22 April 1915, V28 took part in a sortie by the German High Seas Fleet to the Dogger Bank. V28 sank a single British trawler, the Cancer, based out of Grimsby, the only German success of the operation.

In August 1915, German naval forces in the Baltic Sea, supported by the High Seas Fleet including the 9th Torpedo Boat Flotilla, carried out the Battle of the Gulf of Riga. This was an attempt to enter the Gulf of Riga, destroy Russian naval forces in the Gulf and to mine the northern entrances to the Gulf in order to prevent Russian reinforcements. On 10 August, V28 escorted the cruiser Kolberg as the cruiser bombarded Utö island. The two ships encountered five Russian destroyers, with one destroyer hit before they drew away out of range of the German ships. On 20 August, in one of the last actions of the battle, V28 took part in an attack on Pernau, with blockships being used to block the entrance to the harbour. V28, with S32, V183 and V108, escorted the blockships to the harbour, engaging shore batteries in the city's citadel. Overall, German forces failed to meet their objectives, with the torpedo boats S31 and V99 and the minesweeper T46 being sunk, while no major Russian warships were destroyed and the Germans failed to lay the planned minefield.

=== 1916 ===
On 10 February 1916, V28 took part in a sortie by 25 torpedo boats of the 2nd, 6th and 9th Torpedo-boat Flotillas into the North Sea. The sortie led to an encounter between several German torpedo boats and British minesweepers off the Dogger Bank, which resulted in the British minesweeper Arabis being torpedoed and sunk by ships of the 2nd Flotilla. On 24 April 1916, the German battlecruisers of I Scouting Group and the light cruisers of the II Scouting Group set out from Kiel on a mission to bombard the British East-coast towns of Yarmouth and Lowestoft, with the torpedo boats of the 6th and 9th Torpedo Boat Flotillas as escorts, and V26 as part of the 9th Flotilla. The battleships of the High Seas Fleet were deployed in support, with the hope of destroying isolated elements of the British Forces if they tried to intercept. There was a brief engagement between the German forces and the light cruisers and destroyers of the Harwich Force, which caused the German battlecruisers to break off the bombardment of Lowestoft, but rather than take the chance to destroy the outnumbered British force, the Germans chose to retire.

V28 participated in the Battle of Jutland as leader of the 9th Torpedo boat Flotilla, in support of the German battlecruisers. The 9th Flotilla, including V28, took part in a torpedo attack on British battlecruisers from about 17:26 CET (16:26 GMT), with V28 firing two torpedoes. The attack was disrupted by British destroyers, with V27 being immobilised by British destroyer fire and scuttled. None of the German torpedoes found a target. Later during the afternoon, at about 19:00 CET, the 9th Flotilla attempted another torpedo attack against British battlecruisers, which was curtailed by poor visibility and an attack by British destroyers. V28 launching one torpedo at the battlecruiser and one at the British destroyers, both of which missed. From about 20:15 CET (19:15 GMT), V28 took part in a large-scale torpedo attack by the 6th and 9th Torpedo Boat Flotillas on the British fleet in order to cover the outnumbered German battleships' turn away from the British line. The German torpedo boats came under heavy fire from British battleships, with V28 being hit by a single 6-inch (152 mm) shell on the waterline forward, which reduced her speed to 17–19 kn (20–22 mph; 31–35 km/h). V28 launched a single torpedo at the British battle-line (with the torpedo-boat's last torpedo misfiring and remaining in its tube), before turning away. The torpedo, like all those launched in the attack, missed. In addition to V28, G41, G86, G87, S51 and S52 were all damaged in this attack and S35 was sunk.

V28 was part of the 9th Torpedo Boat Flotilla during the inconclusive Action of 19 August 1916, when the German High Seas Fleet sailed to cover a sortie of the battlecruisers of the 1st Scouting Group. In October 1916, the 3rd and 9th Torpedo Boat Flotillas were ordered to reinforce the German naval forces based in Flanders, in order to disrupt the Dover Barrage, a series of anti submarine minefields and nets that attempted to stop U-boats from operating in the English Channel, and to directly attack cross-Channel shipping. The twenty torpedo boats of the two flotillas, including V28, now part of the 18th Half Flotilla of the 9th Flotilla, left Wilhelmshaven on 23 October, reaching Belgium the next day. The 9th Flotilla took part in a large scale raid into the English Channel on the night of 26/27 October 1916, and was assigned the role of attacking Allied shipping while other torpedo boats went after the Dover Barrage, with the 18th Half Flotilla, including V28, to operate off Calais. The 18th Half Flotilla successfully passed through the British defences of the Dover Straits, despite twice encountering British warships on the journey through the barrage. Four British destroyers (Note: Laforey, Liberty, Lucifer and Laurel) on passage to Dunkirk were spotted, but failed to see the German ships, while the old destroyer Flirt spotted the 18th Half Flotilla and challenged them, but the Germans repeated Flirt's signal and continued on course, with Flirt mistaking the ships for the Laforey division and not engaging or reporting the ships. The 18th Half Flotilla did not encounter any of the hoped for merchant ships, but on its return journey clashed with three British destroyers (Note: Viking, Mohawk and Tartar) which attempted to pursue, but lost contact after German fire caused Mohawk's rudder to jam. Other German units sank several drifters that were part of the Dover Barrage together with Flirt (which was attempting to rescue the crews of the drifters) and the merchant ship The Queen, and badly damaged the destroyer Nubian. The 9th Flotilla continued to operate from Flanders, attacking shipping off the coast of the Netherlands on 1 November. On the night of 23/24 November, V28 was one of 13 torpedo boats that took part in an attempt to attack shipping in the Downs. While they clashed briefly with patrolling drifters, they found none of the shipping anchored on the Downs. On the night of 26/27 November, the 9th Flotilla sortied again, stopping the Dutch merchant ship Beijerland and taking her pilot prisoner, and sinking the naval trawler Narval. The torpedo boats V30 and S34 collided during this sortie, badly damaging both ships. The 9th Flotilla (less the two damaged torpedo boats) returned to Germany on 30 November.

=== 1917–1918 ===
By late April 1917, the torpedo boats of the 9th Torpedo Boat Flotilla had been fitted for minesweeping and their crews trained in that task, and became increasingly dedicated to minesweeping. On 3 October 1918, V28 was on patrol in the North Sea off Terschelling with V79, S33 and S34 when S34 struck a mine and sank. The other three torpedo boats went to rescue the survivors of S34's crew, but these rescue operations were observed by the British submarine L10. L10 torpedoed and sank S33, but inadvertently surfaced immediately afterwards and was engaged and sunk by V28 and V79.V28 remained part of the 9th Torpedo Boat Flotilla in November 1918, when the Armistice of 11 November 1918 stopped the fighting between Germany and the Allies.

=== Post-war operations and disposal ===
By the terms of the Armistice, a large proportion of the Imperial German Navy, including 50 modern torpedo boats, was interned at Scapa Flow in Orkney. V28 remained in German hands, however, forming part of the Eisernen Flottille (Note: English: Iron Flotilla), a volunteer force of torpedo boats remaining in active service and used for security duties, although the ship's torpedo tubes were removed under the terms of the Armistice. On 21 June 1919, the German fleet interned at Scapa scuttled itself, and as a result, Germany was forced to hand over more warships and equipment, including V26 to the Allies under the Treaty of Versailles to compensate for the ships scuttled at Scapa. The Allies decided to transfer 10 destroyers from the ships surrendered from the German and Austro-Hungarian to each of the French and Italian navies to replace wartime losses. Twenty of the best of the surrendered German torpedo boats, including V28, were therefore sent to Cherbourg in France to allow France and Italy to make their selection. The unwanted ships would be scrapped by Britain. V28 was not wanted, and was sold for scrap on 21 October 1920, and was broken up at Portishead in 1922.

== Bibliography ==
- Campbell, John (1998). Jutland: An Analysis of the Fighting. London: Conway Maritime Press. ISBN 0-85177-750-3.
- Dodson, Aidan (2019). "Beyond the Kaiser: The IGN's Destroyers and Torpedo Boats After 1918". In Jordan, John (ed.). Warship 2019. Oxford, UK: Osprey Publishing. pp. 129–144. ISBN 978-1-4728-3595-6.
- Fock, Harald (1989). Z-Vor! Internationale Entwicklung und Kriegseinsätze von Zerstörern und Torpedobooten 1914 bis 1939 (in German). Herford, Germany: Koehlers Verlagsgesellschaft mBH. ISBN 3-7822-0207-4.
- Gardiner, Robert; Gray, Randal, eds. (1985). Conway's All The World's Fighting Ships 1906–1921. London: Conway Maritime Press. ISBN 0-85177-245-5.
- Gröner, Erich; Jung, Dieter; Maass, Martin (1983). Die deutschen Kriegsschiffe 1815–1945: Band 2: Torpedoboote, Zerstörer, Schnellboote, Minensuchboote, Minenräumboote (in German). Koblenz: Bernard & Graef Verlag. ISBN 3-7637-4801-6.
- Groos, O. (1923). Der Krieg in der Nordsee: Dritter Band: Von Ende November 1914 bis Unfang Februar 1915. Der Krieg zur See: 1914–1918 (in German). Berlin: Verlag von E. S. Mittler und Sohn – via National Library of Estonia.
- Groos, O. (1924). Der Krieg in der Nordsee: Vierter Band: Von Anfang Februar bis Ende Dezember 1915. Der Krieg zur See: 1914–1918 (in German). Berlin: Verlag von E. S. Mittler und Sohn – via National Library of Estonia.
- Halpern, Paul G. (1994). A Naval History of World War I. London: UCL Press. ISBN 1-85728-498-4.
- Karau, Mark K. (2014). The Naval Flank of the Western Front: The German MarineKorps Flandern 1914–1918. Barnsley, UK: Seaforth Publishing. ISBN 978-1-84832-231-8.
- Kemp, Paul (1999). The Admiralty Regrets: British Warship Losses of the 20th Century. Stroud, UK: Sutton Publishing. ISBN 0-7509-1567-6.
- Massie, Robert K. (2007). Castles of Steel: Britain, Germany and the Winning of the Great War at Sea. London: Vintage Books. ISBN 978-0-099-52378-9.
- Monograph No. 28: Home Waters—Part III. From November 1914 to the end of January 1915 (PDF). Naval Staff Monographs (Historical). Vol. XII. The Naval Staff, Training and Staff Duties Division. 1925.
- Monograph No. 29: Home Waters—Part IV. From February to July 1915 (PDF). Naval Staff Monographs (Historical). Vol. XIII. The Naval Staff, Training and Staff Duties Division. 1925.
- Monograph No. 31: Home Waters Part VI: From October 1915 to May 1916 (PDF). Naval Staff Monographs (Historical). Vol. XV. Naval Staff, Training and Staff Duties Division. 1926.
- Monograph No. 32: Lowestoft Raid: 24th – 25th April, 1916 (PDF). Naval Staff Monographs (Historical). Vol. XVI. The Naval Staff, Training and Staff Duties Division. 1927.
- Monograph No. 33: Home Waters Part VII: From June 1916 to November 1916 (PDF). Naval Staff Monographs (Historical). Vol. XVII. Naval Staff, Training and Staff Duties Division. 1927.
- Newbolt, Henry (1928). History of the Great War: Naval Operations: Volume IV. London: Longmans, Green & Co. OCLC 669033099.
- Rollmann, Heinrich (1929). Der Krieg in der Ostsee: Zweiter Band: Das Kreigjahr 1915. Der Krieg zur See: 1914–1918 (in German). Berlin: Verlag von E. S. Mittler und Sohn.
- Ruge, F. (1972). Warship Profile 27: SM Torpedo Boat B110. Profile Publications.
