= SMS S33 =

History

German Empire
- Name: SMS S33
- Builder: Schichau-Werke, Elbing
- Launched: 4 April 1914
- Completed: 4 October 1914
- Fate: Torpedoed by L10 3 October 1918

General characteristics
- Class & type: V25-class torpedo boat
- Displacement: 802 t (789 long tons) design
- Length: 79.6 m (261 ft 2 in) o/a
- Beam: 8.3 m (27 ft 3 in)
- Draught: 2.8 m (9 ft 2 in)
- Installed power: 23,500 PS (23,200 shp; 17,300 kW)
- Propulsion: 3 × boilers; 2 × steam turbines,
- Speed: 33.5 kn (38.6 mph; 62.0 km/h)
- Complement: 83
- Armament: 3× 8.8 cm KL/45 guns; 6× 50 cm (19.7 in) torpedo tubes

SMS S33 (Note: "SMS" stands for "Seiner Majestät Schiff" (transl. His Majesty's Ship)) (Note: The "S" in S33 denoted the shipbuilder who constructed her.) was a V25-class large torpedo boat of the Imperial German Navy that served during the First World War. She was built by the Schichau-Werke shipyard in Elbing, East Prussia, being launched on 4 April 1914 and was completed in October that year.

S33 served with the German High Seas Fleet in the North Sea during the First World War, taking part in the Scarborough raid on 16 December 1914, the Lowestoft Raid on 24–25 April 1916 and the Battle of Jutland on 31 May–1 June 1916. She was sunk by the British submarine L10 in the North Sea on 3 October 1918.

== Construction and design ==
In 1913, the Imperial German Navy decided to build larger and more seaworthy torpedo boats in place of the smaller V1-class torpedo boats that had been ordered in 1911 and 1912, which had not proved successful. The new, larger, designs would, as well as being more seaworthy, carry a heavier armament and would be oil-fueled only, rather than use the mix of oil- and coal-fueled boilers that German torpedo boats had used up to then. As was normal, orders were placed for a flotilla of 12 torpedo boats in the 1913 fiscal year, with 6 each ordered from AG Vulcan (V25–V30) and Schichau-Werke (S31–S36). The two groups of torpedo boats were of basically similar layout but differed in detailed design.

The 1913 Schichau torpedo boats were 79.6 metres (261 ft 2 in) long overall and 79.0 metres (259 ft 2 in) at the waterline, with a beam of 8.3 metres (27 ft 3 in) and a draught of 2.8 metres (9 ft 2 in). displacement was 802 tonnes (789 long tons) design and 971 tonnes (956 long tons) deep load.

Three oil-fired water-tube boilers fed steam at 18.5 standard atmospheres (272 psi; 1,870 kPa) at two sets of Schichau direct-drive steam turbines. The machinery was rated at 23,500 shaft horsepower (17,500 kW) and gave a design speed of 33.5 knots (38.6 mph; 62.0 km/h). 220 t of oil was carried, giving a range of 1,100 nautical miles (1,300 mi; 2,000 km) at 20 knots (23 mph; 37 km/h).

The ship was armed with three 8.8 cm (3.4 in) L/45 guns and six 50 cm (19.7 in) torpedo tubes, with two single tubes forward and two twin tubes aft of the ship's funnels, with the twin tubes angled out by 15 degrees. Up to 24 mines could be carried. The ship had a crew of 83 officers and men.

S33, yard number 908, was launched on 4 April 1914 and was completed on 4 October that year.

== Service ==
On 15 December 1914 the German battlecruiser squadron under the command of Franz von Hipper set out on an attack on the British east coast towns of Scarborough, Hartlepool, West Hartlepool and Whitby, with the intent of drawing out parts of the British Grand Fleet where it could be defeated in detail. S33 was part of the escort for Hipper's heavy ships, but became detached from her flotilla, and after asking by radio (and failing to receive) a course to rejoin Hipper's force, turned back and set course for home at about 2:00am on 16 December. At about 4:00am, S33 was approaching the Dogger bank when she encountered four British destroyers at close range (160–200 m (170–220 yd)). S33 was turned onto a parallel course to the British destroyers with the hope that she would be mistaken for another British ship. She was not spotted by the British ships, and after 20 minutes steaming a parallel course, broke away and signaled by radio her sighting of the British ship.

On 23 January 1915, a German force of Battlecruisers and light cruisers, escorted by torpedo boats, and commanded by Admiral Franz von Hipper, made a sortie to attack British fishing boats on the Dogger Bank. G9, part of the 10th Half-Flotilla, formed part of the escort for Hipper's force. British Naval Intelligence was warned of the raid by radio messages decoded by Room 40, and sent out the Battlecruiser Force from Rosyth, commanded by Admiral Beatty aboard Lion and the Harwich Force of light cruisers and destroyers, to intercept the German force. The British and German Forces met on the morning of 24 January in the Battle of Dogger Bank. On sighting the British, Hipper ordered his ships to head south-east to escape the British, who set off in pursuit. The armoured cruiser Blücher was disabled by British shells and was sunk, but the rest of the German force escaped, with the German battlecruiser Seydlitz and the British battlecruiser Lion badly damaged.

On 24–25 April 1916, Hipper's battlecruisers carried out another raid on the British coast, this time against Yarmouth and Lowestoft. S33, as part of IX Torpedo Boat Flotilla, was part of the escort for Hipper's force.

S33 sailed as part of the 18th half-flotilla of IX Torpedo Boat Flotilla during the Battle of Jutland, again escorting Hipper's battlecruisers. IX Flotilla took part in a torpedo attack on the British battlecruisers during the "run to the south", which was disrupted by a simultaneous attack by British destroyers on the German battlecruisers. S33 launched two torpedoes in this attack, both of which missed, and was in turn near missed by a British torpedo. After the battlecruiser Lützow was badly damaged by British shells, S33, together with V30, S34, G37 and V45 screened Lützow. Lützow, sinking as a result of flooding, was scuttled during the night of 31 May/1 June. S33 was again part of IX Flotilla when it took part in the action of 19 August 1916.

== Loss ==
On 3 October 1918, S33 was on patrol in the North Sea off Terschelling with S34, V28 and V29 when S34 struck a mine and sank. The other three torpedo boats went to rescue the survivors of S34's crew, but these rescue operations were observed by the British submarine L10. L10 torpedoed S33, but inadvertently surfaced immediately afterwards and was engaged and sunk with all hands by V28 and V29. S33 also sank, with the loss of five of her crew.
