= SMS S36 =

Large Torpedo Boat of the Imperial German Navy

History

German Empire
- Ordered: 1913
- Builder: Schichau-Werke, Elbing
- Launched: 17 October 1914
- Commissioned: 4 January 1915
- Fate: Interned at Scapa Flow 22 November 1918; Scuttled at Scapa Flow 21 June 1919

General characteristics
- Displacement: 971 tonnes (956 long tons)
- Length: 79.6 m (261 ft 2 in) oa
- Beam: 8.3 m (27 ft 3 in)
- Draft: 2.8 m (9 ft 2 in)
- Installed power: 23,500 shp (17,500 kW)
- Propulsion: 3 × water-tube boilers; 2× Steam turbines; 2 shafts
- Speed: 33.5 knots (62.0 km/h; 38.6 mph)
- Range: 1,100 nmi (2,000 km; 1,300 mi) at 20 knots (37 km/h; 23 mph)
- Complement: 83 officers and sailors
- Armament: 3 × 8.8 cm (3.5 in) SK L/45 guns; 6 × 500 mm torpedo tubes; 24 mines

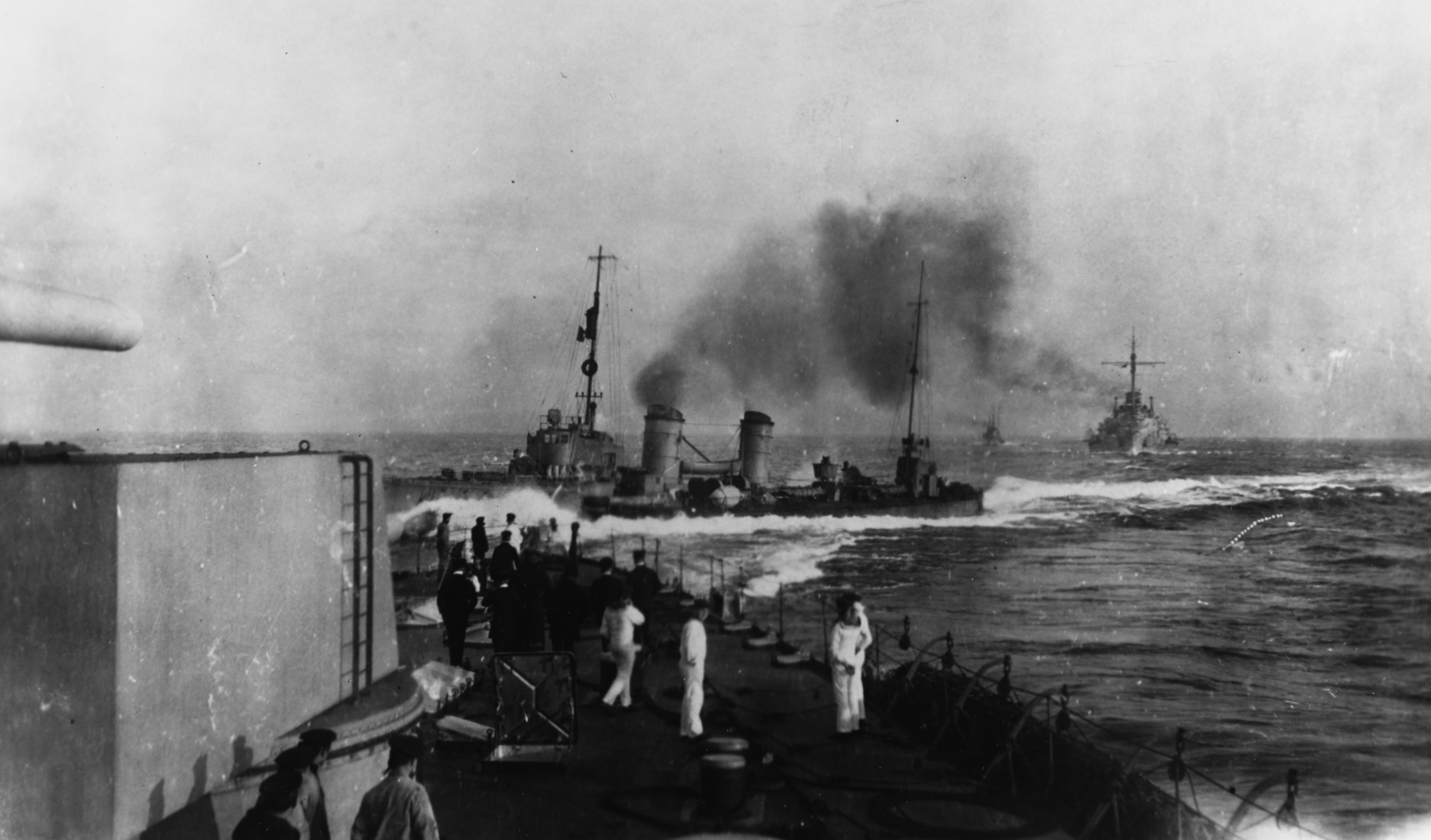
A German Großes Torpedoboot cuts through the High Seas Fleet in 1917.

SMS S36 was a 1913 Type Large Torpedo Boat (Großes Torpedoboot) of the Imperial German Navy during World War I, and the 12th ship of her class. She was equipped with of three single mounted 8.8 cm SK L/45 naval guns and with six 50 cm (19.7 in) torpedo tubes, two forward and four aft; twenty-four mines could also be carried. She was launched on 17 October 1914 and commissioned on 4 January 1915. S36 took part in the Battle of the Gulf of Riga in 1915 and the Battle of Jutland in 1916. In late 1916 she served in the English Channel and took part in a number of engagements, including the Battle of Dover Strait during which a British merchant ship and a destroyer were sunk by her Half-Flotilla. She was scuttled at Scapa Flow in 1919.

== Construction ==
S36 was the last of the half-flotilla of six torpedo-boats ordered from the shipbuilder Schichau-Werke by the Imperial German Navy under its 1913 shipbuilding programme. The "S" in S36 refers to the shipbuilder, Schichau-Werke. In June 1914, while still under construction, S36 and sister ship S35 were sold to Greece, but were repossessed by Germany on 10 August 1914, following the outbreak of the First World War. The ship was launched at Schichau's Elbing shipyard on 17 October 1914 and commissioned on 4 January 1915. The "S" in S36 refers to the shipyard at which she was constructed – Schichau-Werke.

== Description ==
S36 was 79.6 metres (261 ft 2 in) long overall and 79.0 metres (259 ft 2 in) at the waterline, with a beam of 8.3 metres (27 ft 3 in) and a draft of 2.8 metres (9 ft 2 in). Displacement was 802 tonnes (789 long tons) normal and 971 tonnes (956 long tons) deep load. Three oil-fired water-tube boilers fed steam to 2 sets of Schichau steam turbines rated at 23,500 shaft horsepower (17,500 kW), driving two propeller shafts to give a speed of 33.5 knots (62.0 km/h; 38.6 mph). 220 tonnes (220 long tons) of fuel oil was carried, giving a range of 1,100 nautical miles (2,000 km; 1,300 mi) at 20 knots (37 km/h; 23 mph).

Armament consisted of three 8.8 cm SK L/45 naval guns in single mounts, together with six 50 cm (19.7 in) torpedo tubes with two fixed single tubes forward and 2 twin mounts aft. Up to 24 mines could be carried. The ship had a complement of 83 officers and men.

== Service ==
=== Riga and Jutland ===
S36, part of the 17th Half Flotilla, took part in the Battle of the Gulf of Riga in August 1915. This was an attempt by German forces, supported by the High Seas Fleet to enter the Gulf of Riga, destroy Russian naval forces in the Gulf and to mine the northern entrances to the Gulf in order to prevent Russian reinforcement. The attempt failed with Germany losing the torpedo boats S31 and V99 and the minesweeper T46, while failing to destroy any major Russian warships or lay the planned minefield.

S36 participated in the Battle of Jutland, still as a part of the 17th Half Flotilla of the 9th Flotilla. She operated in support of Scouting Group I, which was made up of the German battlecruisers. Together with Scouting Group II, made up of cruisers, and the 2nd and 7th Destroyer Flotillas, they were under the overall command of Vice-Admiral Franz von Hipper. The 9th Flotilla, including S36, took part in a torpedo attack on British battlecruisers from about 17:26 CET (16:26 GMT). The attack was disrupted by British destroyers, with the German torpedo boat V29 sunk by a torpedo from Petard while V27 was disabled by British shells and was scuttled by gunfire from V26. S36 was damaged by shell splinters, which temporarily reduced her speed and wounded four of her crew. On the British side, the destroyer Nomad was disabled and later sunk. Later during the day, at about 19:00 CET, the 9th Flotilla attempted another torpedo attack against British battlecruisers, which was curtailed by poor visibility and an attack by British destroyers, with S36 launching a torpedo at one of these destroyers, which missed. From about 20:15 CET (19:15 GMT), S36 took part in a large-scale torpedo attack on the British fleet in order to cover the outnumbered German battleships' turn to the west. She fired a single torpedo, which again missed.

=== Dover Barrage ===
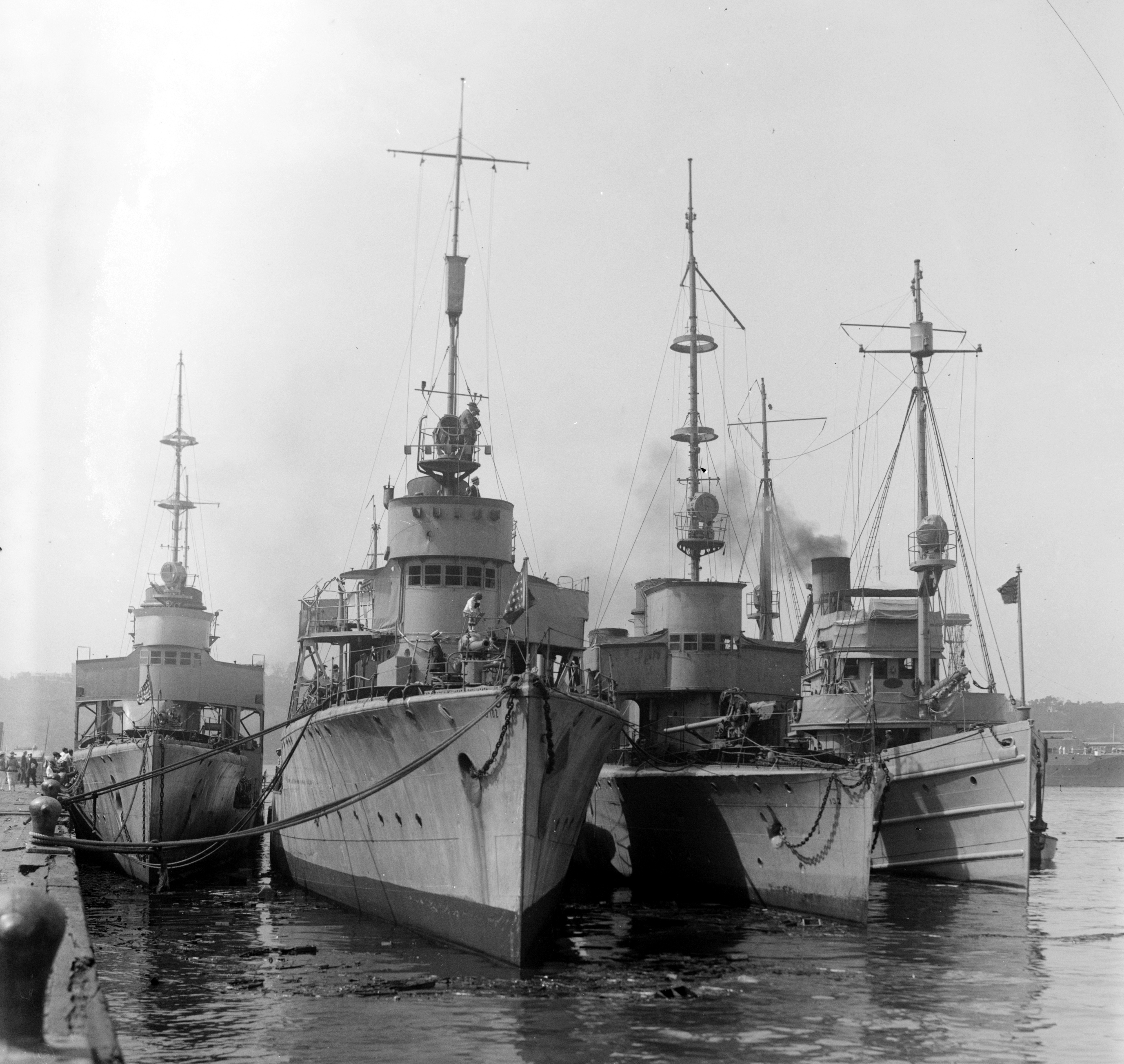
Several German-built Großes Torpedoboot pictured in the US after the war.

In October 1916, the 3rd and 9th Flotillas were ordered to reinforce the German naval forces based in Flanders, in order to disrupt the Dover Barrage, a series of anti submarine minefields and nets that attempted to deter U-boat activities in the English Channel, and to directly attack cross-Channel shipping. The twenty torpedo boats of the two flotillas, including S36, still part of the 17th Half Flotilla of the 9th Flotilla, left Wilhelmshaven on 23 October, reaching Belgium the next day. The 9th Flotilla took part in a large scale raid into the English Channel on the night of 26/27 October 1916, and was assigned the role of attacking Allied shipping while other torpedo boats went after the Dover Barrage, with the 17th Half Flotilla operating north of the Varne Bank. The 17th Half Flotilla sank the merchant ship The Queen, and then, on their journey home, encountered the British destroyer Nubian, which was one of six destroyers that had set out from Dover in response to the attacks on the Dover Barrage. Not knowing the identity of the ships of the 17th Half Flotilla, the commander of Nubian challenged them. Nubian was met with concentrated gunfire and was struck by a German torpedo, completely disabling the ship. Some time later, the 17th Half Flotilla encountered another British destroyer, Amazon, which was again uncertain of the identity of the German ships, and was also heavily damaged by German shellfire. Other German units sank several drifters that were part of the Dover Barrage, and the old destroyer Flirt.

=== Channel sorties ===
The 9th Flotilla took part in a sortie against merchant shipping sailing between Britain and the Netherlands on the night of 1/2 November, and in another raid against shipping in the Channel on the night of 23/24 November, which resulted in a brief, inconclusive, exchange of fire with British armed drifters near the entrance to The Downs before the Germans retired. After a final, unsuccessful, sortie into the Channel on the night of 26 November, the 9th Flotilla, including S36, returned to Germany on 30 November. At war's end 17th Half Flotilla consisted of S36, S51, S52, S60 and V80; V80 was the half-leader.

== Scuttling ==
After the end of hostilities, S36 was interned at Scapa Flow and was scuttled along with most of the rest of the High Seas Fleet on 21 June 1919 in Gutter Sound. She was raised by Cox and Danks and salvaged for scrap in April 1925.
