= SMS S34 =

History

German Empire
- Name: SMS S34
- Builder: Schichau-Werke, Elbing
- Launched: 13 June 1914
- Completed: 5 November 1914
- Fate: Mined and sunk 3 October 1918

General characteristics
- Class & type: V25-class torpedo boat
- Displacement: 802 t (789 long tons) design
- Length: 79.6 m (261 ft 2 in) o/a
- Beam: 8.3 m (27 ft 3 in)
- Draught: 2.8 m (9 ft 2 in)
- Installed power: 23,500 PS (23,200 shp; 17,300 kW)
- Propulsion: 3 × boilers; 2 × steam turbines,
- Speed: 33.5 kn (38.6 mph; 62.0 km/h)
- Complement: 83
- Armament: 3× 8.8 cm KL/45 guns; 6× 50 cm (19.7 in) torpedo tubes

SMS S34 (Note: "SMS" stands for "Seiner Majestät Schiff" (transl. His Majesty's Ship)) (Note: The "S" in S34 denoted the shipbuilder who constructed her.) was a V25-class large torpedo boat of the Imperial German Navy that served during the First World War. She was built by the Schichau-Werke shipyard in Elbing, East Prussia in 1913–1914 and was completed in being launched on 4 April 1914 and was completed in November 1914.

S34 served in the Baltic and with the German High Seas Fleet in the North Sea during the First World War, taking part in the Battle of Dogger Bank in January 1915 and the Battle of Jutland on 31 May–1 June 1916. She also took part in attacks on shipping in the English Channel, including the Battle of Dover Strait in October 1916. She was sunk by a British mine in the North Sea on 3 October 1918.

== Construction and design ==
In 1913, the Imperial German Navy decided to build larger and more seaworthy torpedo boats in place of the smaller V1-class torpedo boats that had been ordered in 1911 and 1912, which had not proved successful. The new, larger, designs would, as well as being more seaworthy, carry a heavier armament and would be oil-fueled only, rather than use the mix of oil- and coal-fueled boilers that German torpedo boats had used up to then. As was normal, orders were placed for a flotilla of 12 torpedo boats in the 1913 fiscal year, with 6 each ordered from AG Vulcan (V25–V30) and Schichau-Werke (S31–S36). The two groups of torpedo boats were of basically similar layout but differed in detailed design.

The 1913 Schichau torpedo boats were 79.6 metres (261 ft 2 in) long overall and 79.0 metres (259 ft 2 in) at the waterline, with a beam of 8.3 metres (27 ft 3 in) and a draught of 2.8 metres (9 ft 2 in). displacement was 802 tonnes (789 long tons) design and 971 tonnes (956 long tons) deep load.

Three oil-fired water-tube boilers fed steam at 18.5 standard atmospheres (272 psi; 1,870 kPa) at two sets of Schichau direct-drive steam turbines. The machinery was rated at 23,500 shaft horsepower (17,500 kW) and gave a design speed of 33.5 knots (38.6 mph; 62.0 km/h). 220 t of oil was carried, giving a range of 1,100 nautical miles (1,300 mi; 2,000 km) at 20 knots (23 mph; 37 km/h).

The ship was armed with three 8.8 cm (3.4 in) L/45 guns and six 50 cm (19.7 in) torpedo tubes, with two single tubes forward and two twin tubes aft of the ship's funnels, with the twin tubes angled out by 15 degrees. Up to 24 mines could be carried. The ship had a crew of 83 officers and men.

S34, yard number 909, was launched on 13 June 1914 and was completed on 5 November that year.

== Service ==
On 23 January 1915, a German force of battlecruisers and light cruisers, escorted by torpedo boats, and commanded by Admiral Franz von Hipper, made a sortie to attack British fishing boats on the Dogger Bank. S34, part of the 18th Torpedo Boat Half-Flotilla, formed part of the escort for Hipper's force. British Naval Intelligence was warned of the raid by radio messages decoded by Room 40, and sent out the Battlecruiser Force from Rosyth, commanded by Admiral Beatty aboard HMS Lion and the Harwich Force of light cruisers and destroyers, to intercept the German force. The British and German Forces met on the morning of 24 January in the Battle of Dogger Bank. On sighting the British, Hipper ordered his ships to head south-east to escape the British, who set off in pursuit. The armoured cruiser Blücher was disabled by British shells and was sunk, but the rest of the German force escaped, with the German battlecruiser Seydlitz badly damaged.

S34, part of IX Torpedo Boat Flotilla, took part in the Battle of the Gulf of Riga in August 1915, and helped to rescue survivors from the German torpedo boat V99 after V99 had been sunk by mines on 17 August. This was an attempt by German forces, supported by the High Seas Fleet to enter the Gulf of Riga, destroy Russian naval forces in the Gulf and to mine the northern entrances to the Gulf in order to prevent Russian reinforcement. The attempt failed with Germany losing the torpedo boat S31 and the minesweeper T46 as well as V99, while failing to destroy any major Russian warships or lay the planned minefield.

S34 participated in the Battle of Jutland, still as a part of the 18th Half Flotilla of the IX Flotilla. IX Flotilla was part of the force commanded by Vice-Admiral Franz von Hipper, consisting of the battlecruisers of Scouting Group I, the light cruisers of Scouting Group II and the 30 torpedo boats of II, VI and IX Flotillas. IX Flotilla took part in a torpedo attack on the British battlecruisers during the "run to the south", which was disrupted by a simultaneous attack by British destroyers on the German battlecruisers. S34 did not launch any torpedoes in this attack. IX Flotilla took part in a second torpedo attack against the British battlecruisers during the "run to the north", with S34 launching a single torpedo, before briefly engaging British destroyers. All of the torpedoes launched by the flotilla in this attack missed their targets. After the battlecruiser Lützow was badly damaged by British shells, S34, together with V30, S33, G37 and V45 screened Lützow. Lützow, in a sinking condition as a result of flooding, was scuttled during the night of 31 May/1 June. S34 was again part of IX Flotilla when it took part in the action of 19 August 1916.

In October 1916, III and IX Torpedo Boat Flotillas were ordered to reinforce the German naval forces based in Flanders, in order to disrupt the Dover Barrage, a series of anti submarine minefields and nets that attempted to stop U-boats from operating in the English Channel, and to directly attack cross-Channel shipping. The twenty torpedo boats of the two flotillas, including S34, still part of the 18th Half Flotilla of IX Flotilla, left Wilhelmshaven on 23 October, reaching Belgium the next day. IX Flotilla took part in a large scale raid into the English Channel on the night of 26/27 October 1916, and was assigned the role of attacking Allied shipping while other torpedo boats went after the Dover Barrage, with the 18th Half Flotilla, including S34, to operate off Calais. The 18th Half Flotilla successfully passed through the British defences of the Dover Straits, despite twice encountering British warships on the journey through the barrage. Four British destroyers (Note: Laforey, Liberty, Lucifer and Laurel) on passage to Dunkirk were spotted, but failed to see the German ships, while the old destroyer Flirt spotted the 18th Half Flotilla and challenged them, but the Germans repeated Flirt's signal and continued on course, with Flirt mistaking the ships for the Laforey division and not engaging or reporting the ships. The 18th Half Flotilla did not encounter any of the hoped for merchant ships, but on its return journey clashed with three British destroyers (Note: Viking, Mohawk and Tartar) which attempted to pursue, but lost contact after German fire caused Mohawk's rudder to jam. Other German units sank several drifters that were part of the Dover Barrage together with Flirt (which was attempting to rescue the crews of the drifters) and the merchant ship The Queen, and badly damaged the destroyer Nubian. IX Flotilla continued to operate from Flanders, attacking shipping off the coast of the Netherlands on 1 November. On the night of 23/24 November, S34 was one of 13 torpedo boats that took part in an attempt to attack shipping in the Downs. While they clashed briefly with patrolling drifters, they found none of the shipping anchored on the Downs. On the night of 26/27 November, IX Flotilla sortied again, stopping the Dutch merchant ship Beijerland and taking her pilot prisoner, and sinking the naval trawler Narval. On the return journey to Zeebrugge, S34 collided with the torpedo boat V30. Both torpedo boats were badly damaged and were under repair until the end of the year before returning to Germany.

On 3 October 1918, S34 was on patrol in the North Sea off Terschelling with S33, V28 and V29 when S34 struck a mine and sank. The other three torpedo boats went to rescue the survivors of S34's crew, but these rescue operations were observed by the British submarine L10. L10 torpedoed and sank S33, but inadvertently surfaced immediately afterwards and was engaged and sunk by V28 and V29. 70 of S34's crew were killed, as were five from S33.
