= German cruiser Lützow =

Several ships can be described as the German cruiser Lützow:

- SMS Lützow, launched in 1913, battlecruiser which was scuttled after the battle of Jutland
- German cruiser Lützow (1939), launched in 1939, sold incomplete to the Soviet Union
- German cruiser Lützow (1940), launched in 1931 as Deutschland, she was renamed Lützow in 1940
