= G38 =

G38 may refer to:

- HMAS Nizam (G38), a Royal Australian Navy destroyer
- SMS G38, the Imperial German Navy torpedo boat
- Junkers G.38, a German transport aircraft of the 1930s
- Glock 38, a firearm
- Bi-pin, G38 a type of bi-pin lamp base
