= SMS S52 =

List of ships with the same or similar names

Two ships of the German Imperial Navy were named SMS S52. They were both torpedo boats built by Schichau-Werke.

- SMS S52 (1889) - torpedo boat launched by Schichau on 20 December 1889. Renamed T52 in 1910. Mined and sunk 8 August 1915.
- SMS S52 (1915) - "large"- or "high-seas"-torpedo boat, launched by Schichau on 12 June 1915. Scuttled at Scapa Flow on 21 June 1919.
