= HMS L10 =

History

United Kingdom
- Name: HMS L10
- Builder: William Denny and Brothers, Dumbarton
- Launched: 24 January 1918
- Commissioned: June 1918
- Fate: Sunk, 3 October 1918

General characteristics
- Class & type: L-class submarine
- Displacement: 914 long tons (929 t) surfaced; 1,089 long tons (1,106 t) submerged
- Length: 238 ft 7 in (72.7 m)
- Beam: 23 ft 6 in (7.2 m)
- Draught: 13 ft 3 in (4.0 m)
- Installed power: 2,400 bhp (1,800 kW) (diesel); 1,600 hp (1,200 kW) (electric)
- Propulsion: 2 × diesel engines; 2 × electric motors
- Speed: 17 kn (31 km/h; 20 mph) surfaced; 10.5 kn (19.4 km/h; 12.1 mph) submerged
- Range: 3,800 nmi (7,000 km; 4,400 mi) at 10 kn (19 km/h; 12 mph) on the surface
- Test depth: 150 feet (45.7 m)
- Complement: 38
- Armament: 4 × bow 21 in (533 mm) torpedo tubes; 2 × beam 18 in (457 mm) torpedo tubes; 1 × 4-inch deck gun

HMS L10 was a L-class submarine built for the Royal Navy during World War I. The boat was sunk in 1918 by German torpedo boats.

== Design and description ==
L9 and its successors were enlarged to accommodate 21-inch (53.3 cm) torpedoes and more fuel. The submarine had a length of 238 feet 7 inches (72.7 m) overall, a beam of 23 feet 6 inches (7.2 m) and a mean draught of 13 feet 3 inches (4.0 m). They displaced 914 long tons (929 t) on the surface and 1,089 long tons (1,106 t) submerged. The L-class submarines had a crew of 38 officers and ratings.

For surface running, the boats were powered by two 12-cylinder Vickers 1,200-brake-horsepower (895 kW) diesel engines, each driving one propeller shaft. When submerged each propeller was driven by a 600-horsepower (447 kW) electric motor. They could reach 17 knots (31 km/h; 20 mph) on the surface and 10.5 knots (19.4 km/h; 12.1 mph) underwater. On the surface, the L class had a range of 3,800 nautical miles (7,000 km; 4,400 mi) at 10 knots (19 km/h; 12 mph).

The boats were armed with four 21-inch torpedo tubes in the bow and two 18-inch (45 cm) in broadside mounts. They carried four reload torpedoes for the 21-inch tubes for a grand total of ten torpedoes of all sizes. They were also armed with a 4-inch (102 mm) deck gun.

== Construction and career ==
HMS L10 was built at Dumbarton by William Denny. She was assigned to serve in the North Sea against German surface units counteracting German efforts to sow mines in British waters. Her greatest success led to her destruction, when on the morning of 3 October 1918, aged just under four months, the L10 surfaced in the Heligoland Bight with the mission of intercepting a German raiding party. This group, consisting of the torpedo boats S34, S33, V28 and V79, had been delayed in the Bight because the S34 had detonated a mine. The other torpedo boats were crowded round their damaged comrade, and so it was easy for L10's commander, Alfred Edward Whitehouse to sneak into position and put a torpedo into the S33, which began to sink. However, as she fired, the L10 rose suddenly to the surface and was seen instantly by the V28, S33, S 60 and V79. Although she turned and tried to flee, L10 was not fast enough to escape her pursuers and was rapidly chased down and sunk at 11:03 (CET) with all hands. S33 was scuttling by a torpedo from S52. L10 was the only L-class boat to be lost during the First World War.

== Discovery ==
On 5 March 2020, it was announced that the wreck of L10 had been found near the island of Terschelling. The discovery was made by the Danish company JD-Contractor, who were searching for the Polish Submarine ORP Orzeł.
