= SMS V30 =

History

German Empire
- Name: SMS V30
- Ordered: 1913
- Builder: AG Vulcan, Stettin
- Launched: 18 September 1914
- Commissioned: 16 November 1914
- Fate: Mined and sunk 20 November 1918

General characteristics
- Class & type: V25-class torpedo boat
- Displacement: 975 t (960 long tons)
- Length: 78.5 m (257 ft 7 in)
- Beam: 8.33 m (27 ft 4 in)
- Draft: 3.63 m (11 ft 11 in)
- Installed power: 23,500 PS (23,200 shp; 17,300 kW)
- Propulsion: 3 × water tube boilers; 2 × AEG Vulcan Steam Turbines
- Speed: 33.5 kn (62.0 km/h; 38.6 mph)
- Range: 1,950 nmi (3,610 km; 2,240 mi) at 17 kn (31 km/h; 20 mph)
- Complement: 83 officers and sailors
- Armament: 3 × 8.8 cm (3.5 in) L/45 guns; 6 × 500 mm torpedo tubes; 24 mines

SMS V30 (Note: "SMS" stands for Seiner Majestät Schiff ('His Majesty's Ship')) (Note: The "V" in V30 denoted the shipbuilder who constructed her.) was a V25-class torpedo boat of the Imperial German Navy that served during the First World War. The ship was built by AG Vulcan at Stettin in Prussia (now Szczecin in Poland), and was completed in November 1914.

V30 served in the North Sea, the Baltic and the English Channel, taking part in the Battle of Dogger Bank in January 1915, the Battle of the Gulf of Riga in August 1915, the Battle of Jutland on 31 May/1 June 1916 and the Battle of Dover Strait in October 1916. She survived the war but was sunk by a mine on the way to be interned in Britain on 20 November 1918.

== Construction and design ==
In 1913, the Imperial German Navy placed orders for 12 high-seas torpedo boats, with six each ordered from AG Vulcan (V25–V30) and Schichau-Werke (S31–S36). (Note: The Imperial German Navy's practice was to split a year's orders into half-flotillas of six torpedo boats from different builders.) While the designs built by each shipyard were broadly similar, they differed from each other in detail, and were significantly larger and more capable than the small torpedo boats built for the German Navy in the last two years.

V30 was laid down as yard number 351 at AG Vulcan's Stettin shipyard, was launched on 18 September 1914 and commissioned on 16 November 1914.

V30 was 78.5 metres (257 ft 7 in) long overall and 77.8 metres (255 ft 3 in) at the waterline, with a beam of 8.33 metres (27 ft 4 in) and a draft of 3.63 metres (11 ft 11 in). Displacement was 812 tonnes (799 long tons) normal and 975 tonnes (960 long tons) deep load. Three oil-fired water-tube boilers fed steam to 2 sets of AEG-Vulcan steam turbines rated at 23,500 metric horsepower (23,200 shp; 17,300 kW), giving a speed of 33.5 knots (62.0 km/h; 38.6 mph). 225 tonnes (221 long tons) of fuel oil was carried, giving a range of 1,080 nautical miles (2,000 km; 1,240 mi) at 20 knots (37 km/h; 23 mph).

Armament consisted of three 8.8 cm SK L/45 naval guns in single mounts, (Note: SK stood for Schnellfeuerkanone (quick-firing gun).) (Note: In Imperial German Navy gun nomenclature, the L/45 denotes the length of the gun. In this case, the L/45 gun is 45 caliber, meaning that the gun is 45 times as long as it is in diameter.) together with six 50 cm (19.7 in) torpedo tubes with two fixed single tubes forward and 2 twin mounts aft. Up to 24 mines could be carried. The ship had a complement of 83 officers and men.

== Service ==
On 23 January 1915, a German force of battlecruisers and light cruisers, escorted by torpedo boats, and commanded by Admiral Franz von Hipper, made a sortie to attack British fishing boats on the Dogger Bank. V30, part of the 18th Torpedo Boat Half-flotilla of the 9th Torpedo Boat Flotilla, formed part of the escort for Hipper's force. British Naval Intelligence was warned of the raid by radio messages decoded by Room 40, and sent out the Battlecruiser Force from Rosyth, commanded by Admiral Beatty aboard HMS Lion and the Harwich Force of light cruisers and destroyers, to intercept the German force. The British and German Forces met on the morning of 24 January in the Battle of Dogger Bank. On sighting the British, Hipper ordered his ships to head south-east to escape the British, who set off in pursuit. The armoured cruiser Blücher was disabled by British shells and was sunk, but the rest of the German force escaped, with the German battlecruiser Seydlitz badly damaged.

In August 1915, German naval forces in the Baltic Sea, supported by the High Seas Fleet, carried out the Battle of the Gulf of Riga. This was an attempt to enter the Gulf of Riga, destroy Russian naval forces in the Gulf and to mine the northern entrances to the Gulf in order to prevent Russian reinforcements. On the initial attempt to enter the Gulf of Riga on 8–9 August, V30 sank a sailing vessel, but the German force abandoned the attempt as minesweeping operations were taking much longer than expected. The Germans attempted the operation again from 16 to 19 August, with V30 again taking part, escorting the cruiser Bremen, but although the German force managed to get past the Russian minefields and enter the Gulf of Riga this time, the operation was still a failure as they failed to sink any major Russian warships or carry out the planned mining operations.

On 10 February 1916, V30 took part in a sortie by 25 torpedo boats of the 2nd, 6th and 9th Torpedo-boat Flotillas into the North Sea. The sortie led to an encounter between several German torpedo boats and British minesweepers off the Dogger Bank, which resulted in the British minesweeper Arabis being torpedoed and sunk by ships of the 2nd Flotilla. On 24 April 1916, the German battlecruisers of I Scouting Group and the light cruisers of the II Scouting Group set out from Kiel on a mission to bombard the British East-coast towns of Yarmouth and Lowestoft, with the torpedo boats of the 6th and 9th Torpedo Boat Flotillas as escorts, and V30 as part of the 9th Flotilla. The battleships of the High Seas Fleet were deployed in support, with the hope of destroying isolated elements of the British Forces if they tried to intercept. There was a brief engagement between the German forces and the light cruisers and destroyers of the Harwich Force, which caused the German battlecruisers to break off the bombardment of Lowestoft, but rather than take the chance to destroy the outnumbered British force, the Germans chose to retire. V30 participated in the Battle of Jutland as part of the 18th Half Flotilla of the 9th Flotilla, in support of the German battlecruisers. V30 was part of the 9th Torpedo Boat Flotilla during the inconclusive Action of 19 August 1916, when the German High Seas Fleet sailed to cover a sortie of the battlecruisers of the 1st Scouting Group.

In October 1916, the 3rd and 9th Torpedo Boat Flotillas were ordered to reinforce the German naval forces based in Flanders, in order to disrupt the Dover Barrage, a series of anti submarine minefields and nets that attempted to stop U-boats from operating in the English Channel, and to directly attack cross-Channel shipping. The twenty torpedo boats of the two flotillas, including V30, now part of the 18th Half Flotilla of the 9th Flotilla, left Wilhelmshaven on 23 October, reaching Belgium the next day. The 9th Flotilla took part in a large scale raid into the English Channel on the night of 26/27 October 1916, and was assigned the role of attacking Allied shipping while other torpedo boats went after the Dover Barrage, with the 18th Half flotilla, including V30, to operate off Calais. The 18th Half flotilla successfully passed through the British defences of the Dover Straits, despite twice encountering British warships on the journey through the barrage. Four British destroyers (Note: Laforey, Liberty, Lucifer and Laurel) on passage to Dunkirk were spotted, but failed to see the German ships, while the old destroyer Flirt spotted the 18th Half Flotilla and challenged them, but V30 repeated Flirt's signal and the Germans continued on course, with Flirt mistaking the ships for British destroyers and not engaging or reporting the ships. The 18th Half Flotilla did not encounter any of the hoped-for merchant ships, but on its return journey clashed with three British destroyers (Note: Viking, Mohawk and Tartar) which attempted to pursue, but lost contact after German fire caused Mohawk's rudder to jam. Other German units sank several drifters that were part of the Dover Barrage together with Flirt (which was attempting to rescue the crews of the drifters) and the merchant ship The Queen, and badly damaged the destroyer Nubian.

The 9th Flotilla continued to operate from Flanders, attacking shipping off the coast of the Netherlands on 1 November. On the night of 23/24 November, V30 was one of 13 torpedo boats that took part in an attempt to attack shipping in the Downs. While they clashed briefly with patrolling drifters, they found none of the shipping anchored on the Downs. On the night of 26/27 November, the 9th Flotilla sortied again, stopping the Dutch merchant ship Beijerland and taking her pilot prisoner, and sinking the naval trawler Narval. V30 and the torpedo boat S34 collided during this sortie, badly damaging both ships. The 9th Flotilla (less the two damaged torpedo boats) returned to Germany on 30 November.

By late April 1917, the torpedo boats of the 9th Torpedo Boat Flotilla had been fitted for minesweeping and their crews trained in that task, and became increasingly dedicated to minesweeping. V30 remained part of the 9th Torpedo Boat Flotilla in November 1918, when the Armistice of 11 November 1918 stopped the fighting between Germany and the Allies.

== Loss ==
By the terms of the Armistice, a large proportion of the Imperial German Navy, including 50 modern torpedo boats, were to be interned at Scapa Flow in Orkney. V30 was one of the torpedo boats allocated for internment, but struck a mine and sunk on passage between Germany and Britain on 20 November 1918, killing two of her crew.

== Bibliography ==
- Campbell, John (1998). Jutland: An Analysis of the Fighting. London: Conway Maritime Press. ISBN 0-85177-750-3.
- Fock, Harald (1989). Z-Vor! Internationale Entwicklung und Kriegseinsätze von Zerstörern und Torpedobooten 1914 bis 1939 (in German). Herford, Germany: Koehlers Verlagsgesellschaft mBH. ISBN 3-7822-0207-4.
- Gardiner, Robert; Gray, Randal, eds. (1985). Conway's All The World's Fighting Ships 1906–1921. London: Conway Maritime Press. ISBN 0-85177-245-5.
- Gröner, Erich; Jung, Dieter; Maass, Martin (1983). Die deutschen Kriegsschiffe 1815–1945: Band 2: Torpedoboote, Zerstörer, Schnellboote, Minensuchboote, Minenräumboote (in German). Koblenz: Bernard & Graef Verlag. ISBN 3-7637-4801-6.
- Goldrick, James (2018). After Jutland: The Naval War in Northern European Waters, June 1916–November 1918. Barnsley, UK: Seaforth Publishing. ISBN 978-1-5267-4298-8.
- Groos, O. (1923). Der Krieg in der Nordsee: Dritter Band: Von Ende November 1914 bis Unfang Februar 1915. Der Krieg zur See: 1914–1918 (in German). Berlin: Verlag von E. S. Mittler und Sohn – via National Library of Estonia.
- Halpern, Paul G. (1994). A Naval History of World War I. London: UCL Press. ISBN 1-85728-498-4.
- Karau, Mark K. (2014). The Naval Flank of the Western Front: The German MarineKorps Flandern 1914–1918. Barnsley, UK: Seaforth Publishing. ISBN 978-1-84832-231-8.
- Massie, Robert K. (2007). Castles of Steel: Britain, Germany and the Winning of the Great War at Sea. London: Vintage Books. ISBN 978-0-099-52378-9.
- Monograph No. 31: Home Waters Part VI: From October 1915 to May 1916 (PDF). Naval Staff Monographs (Historical). Vol. XV. Naval Staff, Training and Staff Duties Division. 1926.
- Monograph No. 32: Lowestoft Raid: 24th – 25th April, 1916 (PDF). Naval Staff Monographs (Historical). Vol. XVI. The Naval Staff, Training and Staff Duties Division. 1927.
- Monograph No. 33: Home Waters Part VII: From June 1916 to November 1916 (PDF). Naval Staff Monographs (Historical). Vol. XVII. Naval Staff, Training and Staff Duties Division. 1927.
- Newbolt, Henry (1928). History of the Great War: Naval Operations: Volume IV. London: Longmans, Green & Co. OCLC 669033099.
- Rollmann, Heinrich (1929). Der Krieg in der Ostsee: Zweiter Band: Das Kreigjahr 1915. Der Krieg zur See: 1914–1918 (in German). Berlin: Verlag von E. S. Mittler und Sohn.
- Ruge, F. (1972). Warship Profile 27: SM Torpedo Boat B110. Profile Publications.
