= SMS Lützow =

Battlecruiser of the German Imperial Navy

- Illustration of Lützow

History

German Empire
- Name: Lützow
- Namesake: Ludwig Adolf Wilhelm von Lützow
- Ordered: 1912–1913 Naval Program
- Builder: Schichau-Werke, Danzig
- Laid down: 15 May 1912
- Launched: 29 November 1913
- Commissioned: 8 August 1915 for trials; March 1916 full commission
- Fate: Sunk at the Battle of Jutland, 1 June 1916
- Notes: Designated war grave

General characteristics
- Class & type: Derfflinger-class battlecruiser
- Displacement: 26,741 t (26,319 long tons; 29,477 short tons) design load
- Length: 210.40 m (690 ft 3 in)
- Beam: 29 m (95 ft 2 in)
- Draft: 9.20 m (30 ft 2 in)
- Installed power: 18 water-tube boilers; 79,881 shp (59,567 kW) (trials)
- Propulsion: 4 × steam turbines; 4 × screw propellers
- Speed: 26.4 knots (48.9 km/h; 30.4 mph)
- Range: 5,600 nmi (10,400 km; 6,400 mi) at 14 knots (26 km/h; 16 mph)
- Complement: 44 officers, 1,068 men
- Armament: 8 × 30.5 cm SK L/50 guns; 14 × 15 cm SK L/45 guns; 8 × 8.8 cm SK L/45 anti-aircraft guns; 4 × 60 cm (24 in) torpedo tubes
- Armor: Belt: 300 mm (11.8 in); Conning tower: 300 mm; Deck: 30 to 80 mm (1.2 to 3.1 in); Turrets: 270 mm (10.6 in)

SMS Lützow (Note: "SMS" stands for "Seiner Majestät Schiff", or "His Majesty's Ship" in German.) was the second Derfflinger-class battlecruiser built by the German Kaiserliche Marine (Imperial Navy) before World War I. Ordered as a replacement for the old protected cruiser Kaiserin Augusta, Lützow was launched on 29 November 1913, but not completed until 1916. Lützow was a sister ship to Derfflinger from which she differed slightly in that she was armed with an additional pair of 15 cm (5.9 inch) secondary guns and had an additional watertight compartment in her hull. She was named in honor of the Prussian general Ludwig Adolf Wilhelm von Lützow who fought in the Napoleonic Wars.

Lützow was commissioned on 8 August 1915, but did not join I Scouting Group until 20 March due to engine damage during trials. This was after most of the major actions conducted by the German battlecruiser force had taken place. As a result, Lützow saw very little action during the war. She took part in only one bombardment operation: the Bombardment of Yarmouth and Lowestoft on 24–25 April 1916, after which she became Admiral Franz von Hipper's flagship. One month later, the ship was heavily engaged during the Battle of Jutland, on 31 May–1 June. During the battle, Lützow sank the British battlecruiser HMS Invincible and is sometimes given credit for sinking the armored cruiser HMS Defence. However, she was heavily damaged by an estimated 24 heavy-caliber shell hits. With her bow thoroughly flooded, the ship was unable to make the return voyage to Germany; her crew was evacuated and she was sunk by torpedoes fired by one of her escorts, the torpedo boat G38.

== Design ==
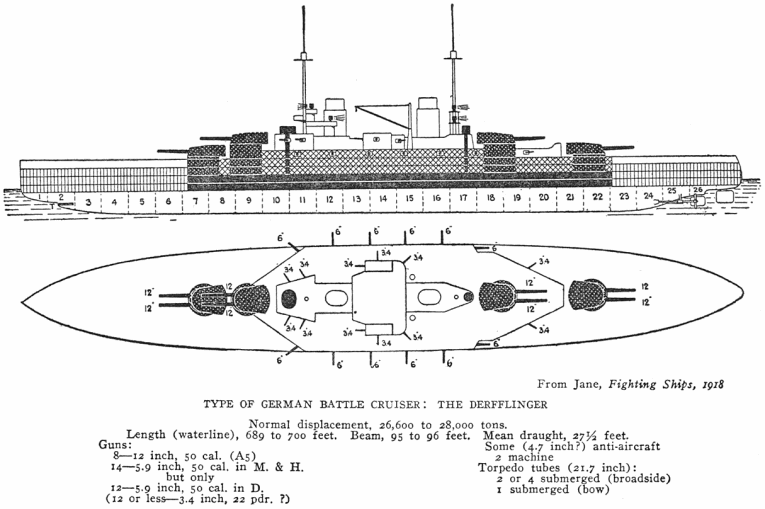
Plan of the Derfflinger-class battlecruiser, from Jane's Fighting Ships 1919

The Derfflinger class was authorized for the 1911 fiscal year as part of the 1906 naval law; design work had begun in early 1910. After their British counterparts had begun installing 34.3 cm (13.5 in) guns in their battlecruisers, senior officers in the German naval command came to the conclusion that an increase in the caliber of the main battery guns from 28 cm (11 in) to 30.5 cm (12 in) would be necessary. To keep costs from growing too quickly, the number of guns was reduced from ten to eight, compared to the earlier Seydlitz, but a more efficient superfiring arrangement was adopted. Lützow, the second member of the class, was allocated to the 1912 construction program.

Lützow was 210.4 m (690 ft 3 in) long overall and had a beam of 29 m (95 ft 2 in) and a draft of 9.2 m (30 ft 2 in) forward and 9.56 m (31 ft 4 in) aft. She was designed to displace 26,600 t (26,200 long tons) normally and she reached 26,741 t (26,319 long tons) at full load. The ship was powered by four Parsons steam turbines that drove four screw propellers. Steam was provided by eighteen naval boilers, fourteen of which burned coal, the other four burning fuel oil. Lützow's powerplant was rated at 63,000 metric horsepower (62,138 shp; 46,336 kW), which generated a top speed of 26.4 knots (48.9 km/h; 30.4 mph). The ship had a crew that consisted of 44 officers and 1,068 to 1,138 enlisted men. While serving as the squadron flagship, her crew was augmented by an additional 14 officers and 62 enlisted men in the commander's staff.

Lützow's armament consisted of a main battery of eight 30.5 cm SK L/50 guns in four gun turrets, (Note: In Imperial German Navy gun nomenclature, "SK" (Schnelladekanone) denotes that the gun is quick firing, while the L/40 denotes the length of the gun. In this case, the L/40 gun is 40 caliber, meaning that the gun is 40 times as long as it is in diameter. See: Grießmer, p. 177.) mounted in superfiring pairs fore and aft of the central superstructure. Her secondary armament consisted of fourteen 15 cm SK L/45 guns mounted in casemates at main deck level. She also carried eight 8.8 cm SK L/45 quick-firing guns in anti-aircraft mounts. The armament suite was rounded out with four 60 cm (24 in) torpedo tubes, all placed in the hull, below the waterline.

Lützow was protected by an armor belt that was 300 mm (11.8 in) thick in the central citadel of the ship where it protected the ammunition magazines and propulsion machinery spaces. Her deck was 30 to 80 mm (1.2 to 3.1 in) thick, with the thicker armor sloping down at the sides to connect to the lower edge of the belt. Her main battery turrets had 270 mm (10.6 in) thick faces. Her secondary casemates received 150 mm (5.9 in) of armor protection. The forward conning tower, where the ship's commander controlled the vessel, had 300 mm walls.

== Service ==
The North Sea, where most German naval operations took place

Lützow was ordered as Ersatz Kaiserin Augusta, to replace the elderly protected cruiser Kaiserin Augusta, which was by then 20 years old. (Note: German ships were ordered under provisional names; new additions to the fleet were given a letter designation, while those ordered as replacements for older vessels were named "Ersatz (ship name)." Once the ship was finished, the vessel would be commissioned with its intended name. For example, SMS Derfflinger was ordered as a new addition to the fleet, and so was given the provisional designation "K." Lützow's other sister, Hindenburg, was ordered to replace the old Hertha, and so was named Ersatz Hertha before she was formally commissioned. See: Dodson, pp. 8–9.) Built by Schichau-Werke in Danzig, her keel was laid down in May 1912, and she was launched on 29 November 1913. Lützow was commissioned on 8 August 1915 for trials, and was sent to Kiel on 23 August. The torpedo boats G192, G194, and G196 provided a screen for hostile submarines that might be operating in the area, the four vessels arriving the next day. There she completed her final fitting out, including her armament. On 13 September, she began her trials, including torpedo firing tests on 15 September and gunnery tests on 6 October. While on trials on 25 October, Lützow's port low-pressure turbine was badly damaged. Repairs were conducted in Kiel until late January 1916, after which the ship underwent further trials. These were finished on 19 February; Lützow was assigned to I Scouting Group on 20 March, and arrived at her new unit four days later.

The ship's first and only commander was Kapitän zur See (Captain at Sea) Victor Harder. On 24 April, Lützow and the battlecruisers Seydlitz and Moltke made a brief sortie into the North Sea, cruising to the eastern end of the Amrun Bank, since British destroyers had been reported to have been in the area. A second sweep followed two days later, also to the Amrun Bank. While on this operation, a British submarine attempted to torpedo Lützow without success. Konteradmiral (Rear Admiral) Friedrich Boedicker, the deputy commander of I Scouting Group, temporarily raised his flag aboard the ship from 29 March to 11 April. On 21–22 April, Lützow joined the rest of the High Seas Fleet for a sortie into the North Sea that failed to locate any British warships.

=== Bombardment of Yarmouth and Lowestoft ===
Lützow' first major operation was the bombardment of Yarmouth and Lowestoft on 24–25 April. Konteradmiral Franz von Hipper, the commander of I Scouting Group, was away on sick leave, so the German ships were under the command of Boedicker. Seydlitz, the flagship, followed by Derfflinger, Lützow, Moltke, and Von der Tann left the Jade Estuary at 10:55 on 24 April, and were supported by a screening force of six light cruisers and two torpedo boat flotillas. The heavy units of the High Seas Fleet sailed at 13:40, with the objective to provide distant support for Boedicker's ships. The British Admiralty was made aware of the German sortie through the interception of German Wireless signals, and deployed the Grand Fleet at 15:50.

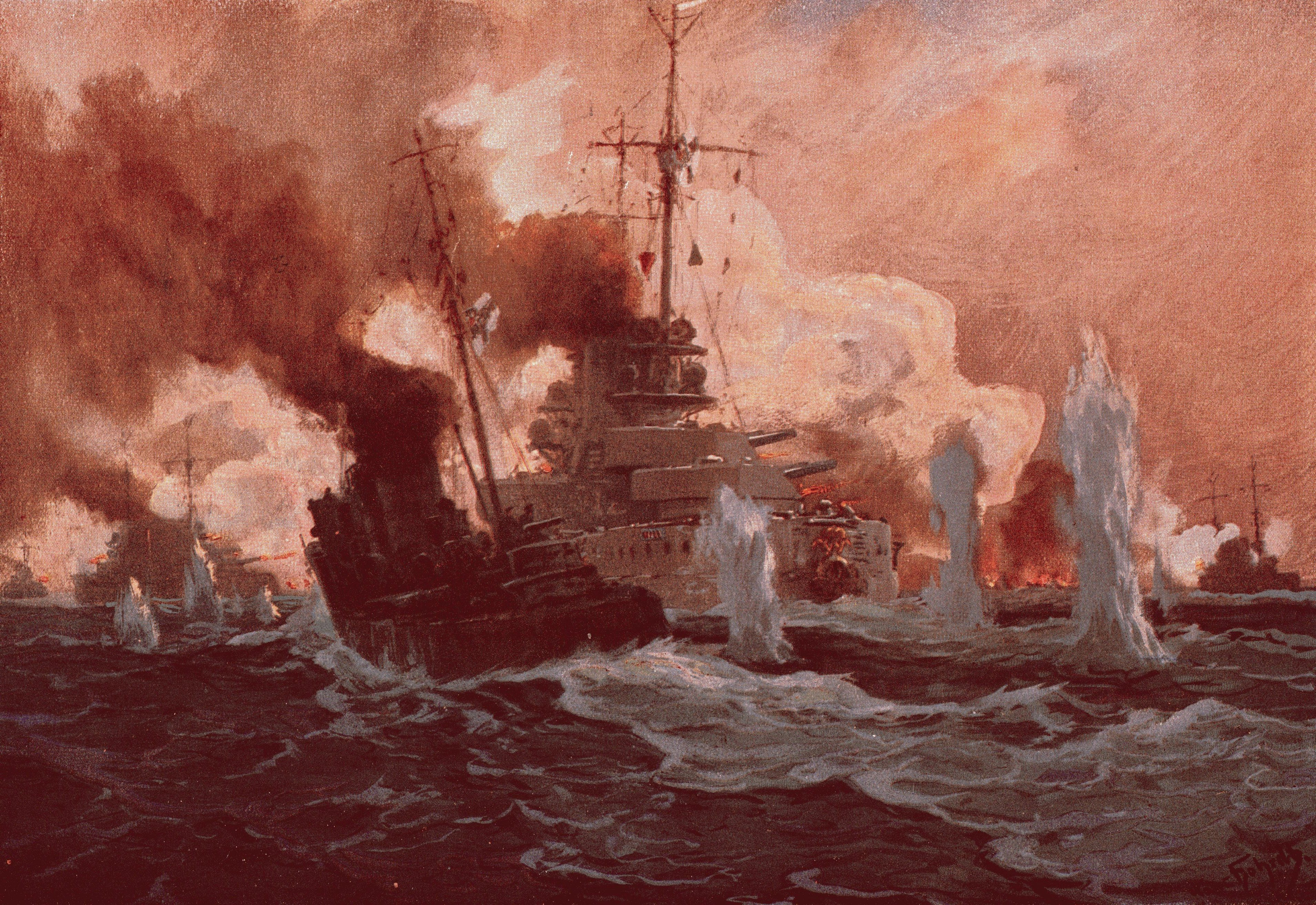
The German battlecruisers bombarding Lowestoft

In the meantime, by 14:00, Boedicker's ships had reached a position off Norderney, at which point he turned his ships northward to avoid the Dutch observers on the island of Terschelling. At 15:38, Seydlitz struck a mine, which tore a 15-metre (49 ft) long hole in her hull, just abaft of the starboard broadside torpedo tube, allowing 1,400 short tons (1,250 long tons) of water to enter the ship. Seydlitz turned back with the screen of light cruisers at a speed of 15 knots (28 km/h). The four remaining battlecruisers turned south immediately in the direction of Norderney to avoid further mine damage. By 16:00, Seydlitz was clear of imminent danger, so the ship stopped to allow Boedicker to disembark. The torpedo boat V28 took Boedicker to Lützow.

At 04:50 on 25 April, the German battlecruisers were approaching Lowestoft when the light cruisers Rostock and Elbing, which had been covering the southern flank, spotted the light cruisers and destroyers of Commodore Reginald Tyrwhitt's Harwich Force. Boedicker refused to be distracted by the British ships, and instead trained his ships' guns on Lowestoft. The German battlecruisers destroyed two 6 in (15 cm) shore batteries and inflicted other damage to the town. In the process, a single 6 in shell from one of the shore batteries struck Moltke, but the ship sustained no significant damage.

At 05:20, the German raiders turned north, towards Yarmouth, which they reached by 05:42. The visibility was so poor that the German ships fired one salvo each, with the exception of Derfflinger, which fired fourteen rounds from her main battery. The German ships turned back south, and at 05:47 encountered for the second time the Harwich Force, which had by then been engaged by the six light cruisers of the German screening ships. Boedicker's ships opened fire from a range of 12,000 m (13,000 yards). Tyrwhitt immediately turned his ships around and fled south, but not before the cruiser Conquest sustained severe damage. Due to reports of British submarines and torpedo attacks, Boedicker broke off the chase and turned back east towards the High Seas Fleet. At this point, Admiral Reinhard Scheer, commander of the High Seas Fleet, turned back towards Germany, having been warned of the Grand Fleet's sortie from Scapa Flow.

=== Battle of Jutland ===
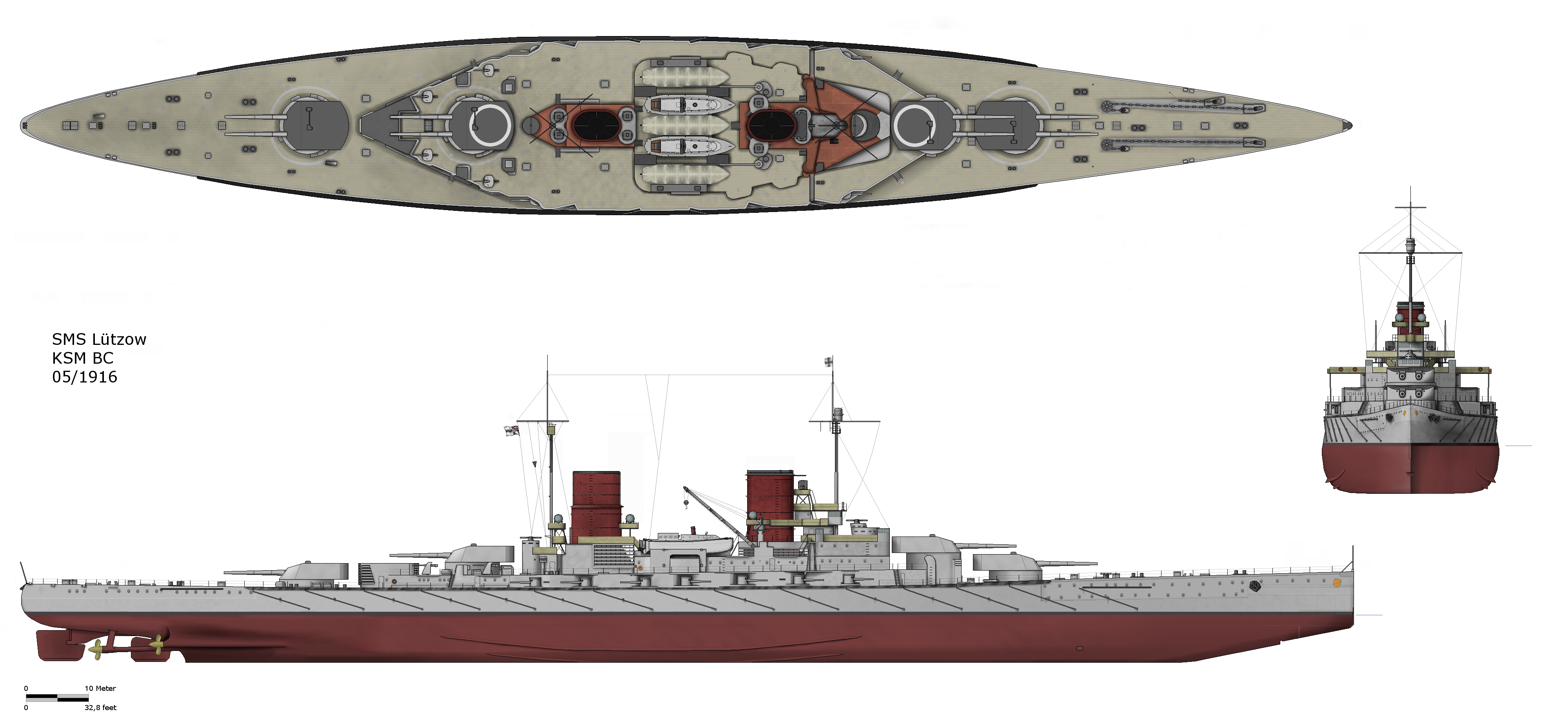
Lützow in her configuration at Jutland

At 02:00 CET, (Note: The times mentioned in this section are in CET, which is congruent with the German perspective. This is one hour ahead of GMT, the time zone commonly used in British works.) on 31 May 1916, I Scouting Group departed the Jade estuary; Lützow, Hipper's flagship, was the leading vessel, followed by her sister Derfflinger, Seydlitz, Moltke, and Von der Tann. The ships were accompanied by II Scouting Group, under the command of Rear Admiral Boedicker, composed of the four light cruisers Frankfurt, Wiesbaden, Pillau, and Elbing. The reconnaissance force was screened by 30 torpedo boats of II, VI, and IX Flotillas, directed by the cruiser Regensburg. An hour and a half later, the High Seas Fleet—under the command of Admiral Scheer—left the Jade with 16 dreadnoughts. (Note: SMS König Albert was in dock at the time. See: Tarrant, p. 62.) It was accompanied by IV Scouting Group, composed of the light cruisers Stettin, München, Hamburg, Frauenlob, and Stuttgart, and 31 torpedo boats of I, III, V, and VII Flotillas, led by the light cruiser Rostock. The six pre-dreadnoughts of II Battle Squadron had departed from the Elbe roads at 02:45, and rendezvoused with the battle fleet at 5:00. The operation was to be a repeat of previous German fleet actions: to draw out a portion of the Grand Fleet and destroy it.

==== Opening actions ====
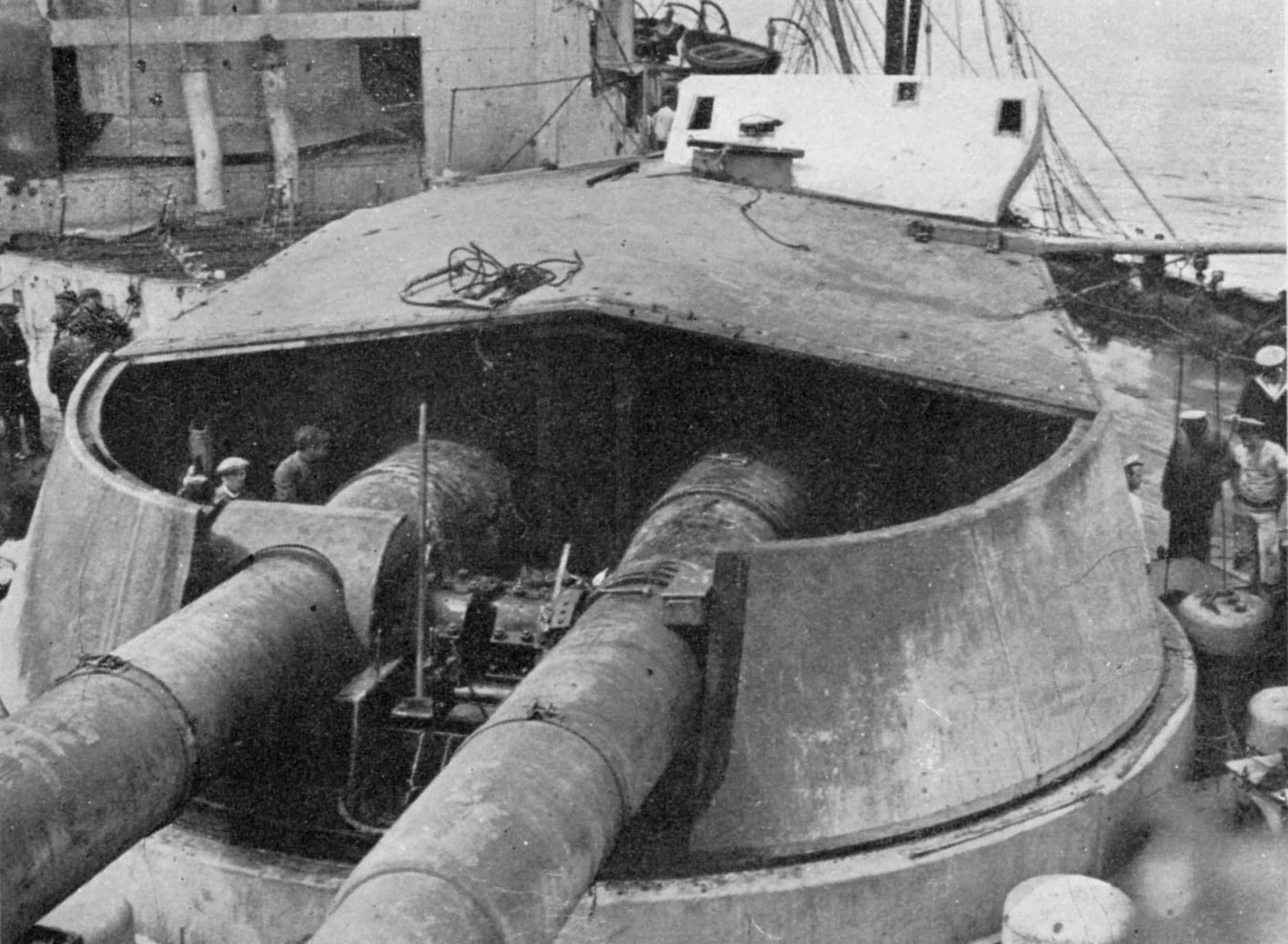
Lion's destroyed "Q" turret after the battle

Shortly before 16:00, Hipper's force encountered Vice Admiral David Beatty's 1st Battlecruiser Squadron. At 16:00, Hipper ordered the signal "Distribution of fire from left" be hoisted on Lützow. The German ships were the first to open fire, at a range of approximately 15,000 yards (14,000 m). The two leading British battlecruisers, Lion and Princess Royal, concentrated their fire on Lützow, while Lützow engaged only Lion. The ship's gunners aimed their initial salvo at a range of 16,800 yards (15,400 m), well over their intended target. The ship fired semi-armor-piercing (SAP) shells, unlike the other German battlecruisers, which had loaded armor-piercing (AP) shells instead. The British rangefinders had misread the range to their German targets, and so the first salvos fired by the British ships fell a mile beyond their German opponents; Lion's gunners fired their opening salvo at 18,500 yards (16,900 m). In the span of three minutes, Lützow had fired four more salvos, alternating between the four forward and four aft guns, and had struck with the last one at 16:51.

Lützow scored a second hit a minute later at 16:52. Eight minutes later, Lion scored the first hit on Lützow; a salvo from the British ship struck the battlecruiser on her forecastle, but no major damage was done. These two hits would prove to be very important, however, as Lützow took on more water due to damage sustained later in the battle, since they allowed water to enter the ship above the armored deck. Nearly simultaneously, Lützow dealt a tremendous blow to Lion; one of her 30.5 cm shells penetrated the roof of Lion's center "Q" turret and detonated the munitions that were stored inside. Only by the resolute actions of the turret commander—Major Francis Harvey, who ordered the magazine be flooded—did the ship avoid a catastrophic magazine explosion. (Note: Ammunition magazines on warships were equipped with seacocks that allowed the magazine to be flooded in case of a fire. By flooding the magazine, a catastrophic explosion would be averted.) Indeed, approximately 30 minutes after the turret was destroyed, the fire in the turret spread to the working chamber that was directly above the magazine; there it detonated propellant charges that had been stored there. The resulting explosion would have likely destroyed the ship if the ammunition magazine had not been flooded.

At 17:03, the rearmost British battlecruiser, Indefatigable, was struck by several shells from her opponent, Von der Tann. The forward ammunition magazines were penetrated and set on fire; the resulting explosion tore the ship apart. Shortly thereafter, Lützow scored several more hits on Lion, though without serious damage being done. Lützow's gunnery officer, Günther Paschen, later regretted the decision to fire SAP shells, believing that had Lützow fired AP rounds, she would have destroyed Lion during this action. In the course of the first nineteen minutes of the battle, Lützow had fired thirty-one salvos at Lion, scoring six hits, forcing the latter to sheer out of line temporarily. From 17:10 to 17:16, Lützow resumed firing at Lion, but in the haze, her gunners believed they were engaging Princess Royal. During this period, Princess Royal opened fire on Lützow and scored two hits, the first of which exploded between the forward turrets and the second struck the belt. At 17:24, Lützow again opened fire at Lion and scored three more hits in the span of thirty seconds.

In an attempt to regroup his ships, Admiral Beatty sought to turn his ships away by 2 degrees while the Queen Elizabeth-class battleships of the 5th Battle Squadron arrived on the scene and provided covering fire. As the British battlecruisers began to turn away, Seydlitz and Derfflinger were able to concentrate their fire on Queen Mary. Witnesses reported at least five shells from two salvos hit the ship, which caused an intense explosion that ripped the Queen Mary in half. Shortly after the destruction of Queen Mary, both British and German destroyers attempted to make torpedo attacks on the opposing lines. The British destroyers Nestor and Nicator each fired two torpedoes at Lützow, though all four missed. At 17:34, Lützow launched a torpedo at the battlecruiser Tiger without success. Lützow scored another hit on Lion at 17:57, followed by three more hits, one of which started a fire in the aft secondary battery.

The leading ships of the German battle fleet had by 18:00 come within effective range of the British ships, and had begun trading shots with the British battlecruisers and Queen Elizabeth-class battleships. At 18:13, a 15 in (380 mm) shell from one of the Queen Elizabeths struck Lützow; two more hits came at 18:25 and 18:30. The ship was hit again at 18:45, probably by Princess Royal. The ship continued to engage the British battlecruisers as they steamed north toward the Grand Fleet, but had no success during this period. Later, at 19:05, she scored one hit on Lion. During the engagements between the combined German fleet and the British 1st Battlecruiser and 5th Battle Squadrons, Lützow had both of her wireless transmitters damaged; after that point, the only method of communication between ships was via signal lamp.

==== Battlefleets engage ====
Shortly after 19:00, the German cruiser Wiesbaden had become disabled by a shell from the battlecruiser Invincible; the German battlecruisers made a 16-point turn to the northeast and made for the crippled cruiser at high speed. III Battle Squadron of the German fleet, which contained the most powerful battleships of the German navy, also altered course to assist Wiesbaden. Simultaneously, the British III and IV Light Cruiser Squadrons began a torpedo attack on the German line; while advancing to torpedo range, they smothered Wiesbaden with fire from their main guns. During the turn to the northeast, the British destroyers Onslow and Acasta approached to launch torpedoes at Lützow, though without success. Onslow was hit three times by Lützow's secondary battery and was forced to withdraw. Shortly thereafter, a second destroyer, Acasta launched a torpedo at Lützow that missed; in return, Lützow and Derfflinger fired a barrage of 15 cm shells at Acasta, hitting her twice. At 19:15, the German battlecruisers spotted the British armored cruiser Defence, which had joined the attack on Wiesbaden. Hipper initially hesitated, believing the ship was the German cruiser Rostock, but at 19:16, Kapitän zur See (KzS) Harder, Lützow's commanding officer, ordered his ships' guns to fire. The other German battlecruisers and battleships joined in the melee; Lützow fired five broadsides in rapid succession. In the span of less than five minutes, Defence was struck by several heavy-caliber shells from the German ships. One salvo penetrated the ship's ammunition magazines and, in a massive explosion, destroyed the cruiser. (Note: John Campbell, in his book Jutland: An Analysis of the Fighting, writes "Her sinking is usually credited to the Lützow, though it was also claimed by the Markgraf and Kaiser, and less plausibly by the Kronprinz. The SMS Grosser Kurfürst noted that both of her 12in salvos at the Defence hit at short range, but did not claim credit for her destruction." See Campbell, p. 181.)

Invincible explodes

While Lützow and the rest of the fleet were concentrating on Defence, Lion scored two hits on Hipper's flagship, causing a serious fire. By 19:24, the 3rd Battlecruiser Squadron had formed up with Beatty's remaining battlecruisers ahead of the German line. The leading British ships spotted Lützow and Derfflinger, and began firing on them. In the span of eight minutes, Invincible scored eight hits on Lützow; these hits were mainly concentrated in the ship's bow and were the primary cause of the flooding that would eventually cause her to sink. In return, both Lützow and Derfflinger concentrated their fire on Invincible, and 19:33, Lützow's third salvo penetrated Invincible's center turret and ignited the magazine; the ship disappeared in a series of massive explosions. From this point onward, Lützow came under no further fire from the British battlecruisers, though she was flooding badly from two of the hits from Invincible that had struck below the waterline.

By 19:30, the High Seas Fleet, which was by that point pursuing the British battlecruisers, had not yet encountered the Grand Fleet. Scheer had been considering retiring his forces before darkness exposed his ships to torpedo boat attack. He had not yet made a decision when his leading battleships encountered the main body of the Grand Fleet. This development made it impossible for Scheer to retreat, for doing so would have sacrificed the slower pre-dreadnought battleships of II Battle Squadron. If he chose to use his dreadnoughts and battlecruisers to cover their retreat, he would have subjected his strongest ships to overwhelming British fire. Instead, Scheer ordered his ships to turn 16 points to starboard, (Note: A full circle has 32 points, each equal to 11.25 degrees; a 16-point turn would be a reversal of direction.) which would bring the pre-dreadnoughts to the relative safety of the disengaged side of the German battle line.

==== Lützow withdraws and sinks ====
The other battlecruisers followed the move, but Lützow had lost speed and was unable to keep up. Instead, the ship tried to withdraw to the southwest to escape the punishing British gunfire. By 20:00, flooding in the forward part of the ship had reached the magazine for the forward turret. The gun crew brought up as many shells and propellant charges as could be stored in the working chamber below the turret. Shortly before, at 19:50, Kommodore Andreas Michelsen, aboard the cruiser Rostock, dispatched the torpedo boats of I Half-Flotilla to assist Lützow. G39 came alongside and took Hipper and his staff aboard, in order to transfer him to one of the other battlecruisers. V45 and G37 began laying a smoke screen between the battered ship and the British line, but at 20:15, before it was finished, Lützow was struck in quick succession by four heavy-caliber shells. One pierced the ship's forward superfiring turret and temporarily disabled it. The shell detonated a propellant charge and the right gun was destroyed. The second hit disabled the electric training gear of the rearmost turret, which now had to be operated by hand. While Hipper was aboard G39, command of I Scouting Group temporarily fell to KzS Johannes Hartog. Lützow fired her last shot at 20:45, at which point the smoke screen had successfully hidden her from the British line.

As the German fleet began to withdraw after nightfall, Lützow, steaming at 15 knots, attempted to pass behind the German line to seek the safety of the disengaged side. By 22:13, the last German ship in the line lost sight of Lützow, which was unable to keep up with the fleet. Scheer hoped that in the foggy darkness, Lützow could evade detection and successfully return to a German port. By 21:30, the ship was settling deeper into the sea. Water began to wash onto the deck and into the forecastle above the main armored deck; this would prove to be a significant problem. At midnight, there was still hope that the severely wounded Lützow could make it back to harbor. The ship was capable of 7 knots (13 km/h; 8.1 mph) up until around 00:45 when she began taking on more water. At times, the ship had to slow down to as little as 3 knots (5.6 km/h; 3.5 mph) to reduce pressure on the rear bulkhead in the torpedo flat. Critically, the forward main pumps were no longer usable, as the control rods had jammed.

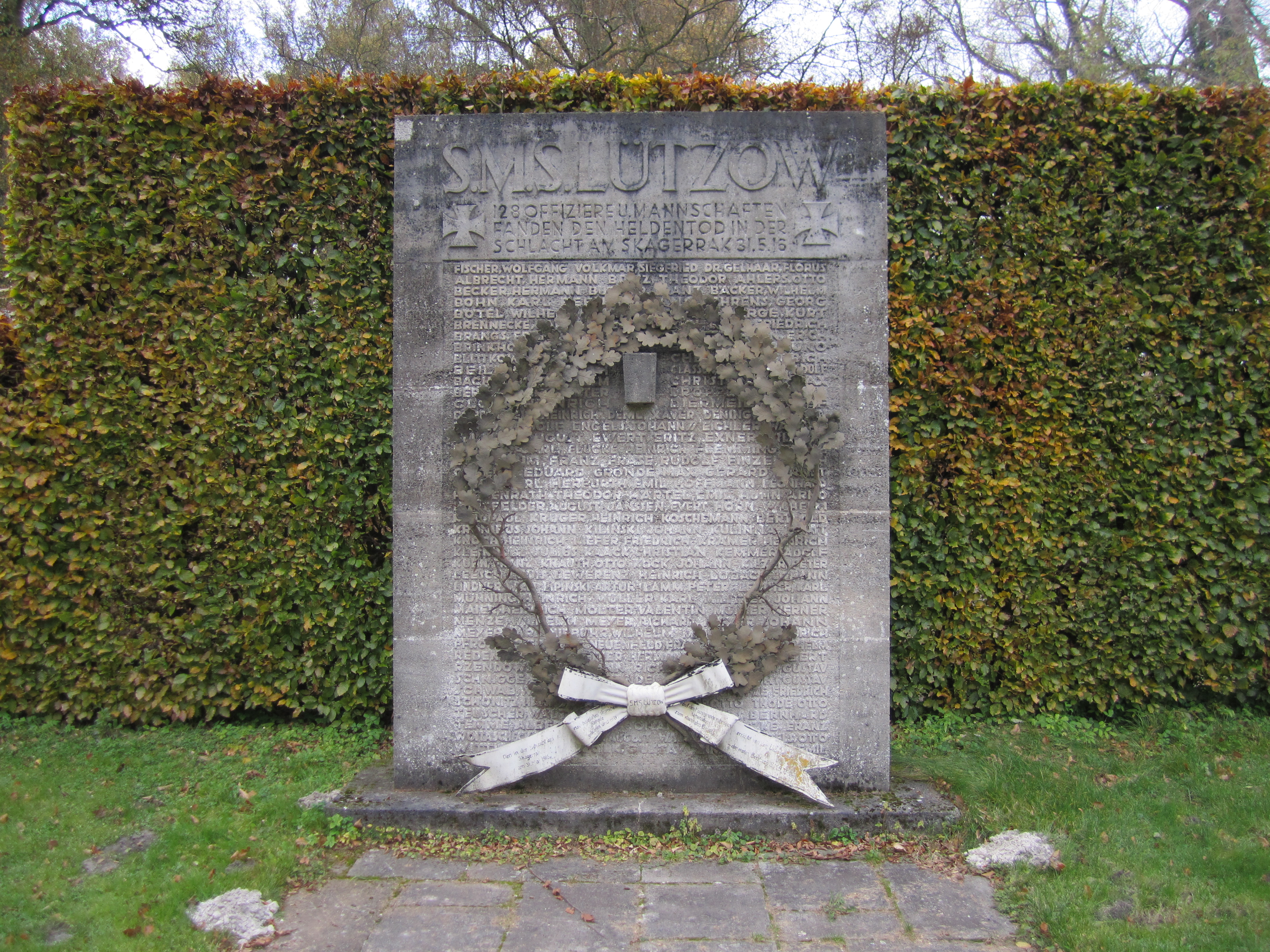
Memorial in Wilhelmshaven for the sailors killed aboard Lützow

By 01:00, there was too much water in the hull for the pumps to handle. Water began to enter the forward generator compartments, which forced the crew to work by candlelight. Lützow was so low in the water by 01:30 that water began to flood the forward boiler room. By that point, almost all of the compartments in the forward part of the ship, up to the conning tower and below the main armored deck, were thoroughly flooded. Water had also entered the ship through shell holes in the forecastle above the armored deck; the majority of the upper portion of the ship forward of the forward-most barbette was flooded as well. The battlecruiser's crew attempted to patch the shell holes three times, but as the flooding worsened and the draft increased, water increasingly washed over the deck and inhibited progress on the repair work. The crew attempted to reverse direction and steam backwards, but this had to be abandoned when the bow became so submerged that the propellers were pulled partially out of the water; forward draft had increased to over 17 metres (56 ft). (Note: Normal draft was 9.2 m forward. See: Gröner, p. 56.)

By 2:20, an estimated 8,000 tons of water was in the ship, and she was in serious danger of capsizing, so Harder gave the order to abandon ship. The torpedo boats G37, G38, G40, and V45 came alongside the stricken battlecruiser to evacuate the ship's crew, though six men were trapped in the bow and could not be freed. By 02:45 Lützow was submerged up to her bridge. G38 fired two torpedoes into the ship, and two minutes later she disappeared below the waves. The ship was approximately 60 km (37 mi) north-west of Horns Reef when she was scuttled. The position of the wreck is estimated to be 56°15′N 5°53′E. During the battle, Lützow had fired an estimated 380 main battery shells and 400 rounds from her secondary guns, as well as two torpedoes. In return, she was hit 24 times by British heavy-caliber shells. The ship's crew suffered 115 men killed and another 50 wounded, second only to Derfflinger, which lost 157 men killed and 26 wounded.

In 2015, the survey ship HMS Echo conducted an exploration of the area while laying a tide gauge. During the search, Echo's sonar located Lützow on the sea floor, some eight miles from her last recorded position. Echo took sonar images of the wreck, which her commander stated would "ensure the ship's final resting place is properly recognised as a war grave."

== See also ==
- German cruiser Lützow, for other warships named Lützow
