= SMS V27 =

V25-class torpedo boat

History

German Empire
- Ordered: 1913
- Builder: AG Vulcan, Stettin
- Launched: 26 March 1914
- Commissioned: 2 September 1914
- Fate: Sunk at the Battle of Jutland, 31 May 1916

General characteristics
- Displacement: 975 t (960 long tons)
- Length: 78.5 m (257 ft 7 in)
- Beam: 8.33 m (27 ft 4 in)
- Draft: 3.63 m (11 ft 11 in)
- Installed power: 23,500 PS (23,200 shp; 17,300 kW)
- Propulsion: 3 × water tube boilers; 2 × AEG Vulcan Steam Turbines
- Speed: 33.5 kn (62.0 km/h; 38.6 mph)
- Range: 1,950 nmi (3,610 km; 2,240 mi) at 17 kn (31 km/h; 20 mph)
- Complement: 83 officers and sailors
- Armament: 3 × 8.8 cm (3.5 in) L/45 guns; 6 × 500 mm torpedo tubes; 24 mines

SMS V27 was a V25-class torpedo boat of the Imperial German Navy that served during the First World War. The ship was built by AG Vulcan at Stettin in Prussia (now Szczecin in Poland), and was completed in September 1914. The ship was sunk at the Battle of Jutland on 31 May 1916.

== Construction and design ==
In 1913, the Imperial German Navy placed orders for 12 high-seas torpedo boats, with six each ordered from AG Vulcan (V25–V30) and Schichau-Werke (S31–S36). While the designs built by each shipyard were broadly similar, they differed from each other in detail, and were significantly larger and more capable than the small torpedo boats built for the German Navy in the last two years.

V27 was launched from AG Vulcan's Stettin shipyard on 26 March 1914 and commissioned on 2 September 1914. The "V" in V27 refers to the shipyard at which she was constructed.

V27 was 78.5 metres (257 ft 7 in) long overall and 77.8 metres (255 ft 3 in) at the waterline, with a beam of 8.33 metres (27 ft 4 in) and a draft of 3.63 metres (11 ft 11 in). Displacement was 812 tonnes (799 long tons) normal and 975 tonnes (960 long tons) deep load. Three oil-fired water-tube boilers fed steam to 2 sets of AEG-Vulcan steam turbines rated at 23,500 metric horsepower (23,200 shp; 17,300 kW), giving a speed of 33.5 knots (62.0 km/h; 38.6 mph). 225 tonnes (221 long tons) of fuel oil was carried, giving a range of 1,080 nautical miles (2,000 km; 1,240 mi) at 20 knots (37 km/h; 23 mph).

Armament consisted of three 8.8 cm SK L/45 naval guns in single mounts, together with six 50 cm (19.7 in) torpedo tubes with two fixed single tubes forward and 2 twin mounts aft. Up to 24 mines could be carried. The ship had a complement of 83 officers and men.

== Service ==
In October 1914, V27 was listed as part of the 17 half-flotilla of the 9th Torpedo Boat Flotilla. The 17th half-flotilla, including V27, which was under training, was deployed to the Baltic in October 1914 to take part in operations against British submarines. Between 15 and 17 December 1914, V27, as part of the 9th Flotilla, took part in the Raid on Scarborough, Hartlepool and Whitby. V27 took part in the Battle of the Gulf of Riga in August 1915.

V27 participated in the Battle of Jutland as part of the 17th Half Flotilla of the 9th Flotilla, in support of the German battlecruisers. The 9th Flotilla, including V27, took part in a torpedo attack on British battlecruisers from about 17:26 CET (16:26 GMT). The attack was disrupted by British destroyers, and V27 was immobilised by two 4-inch (102 mm) shell hits, one of which severed her main steam pipe. Her crew was taken off by V26 which then scuttled V27 with gunfire. Three of V27's crew were wounded.

== Bibliography ==
- Campbell, John (1998). Jutland: An Analysis of the Fighting. London: Conway Maritime Press. ISBN 0-85177-750-3.
- Fock, Harald (1989). Z-Vor! Internationale Entwicklung und Kriegseinsätze von Zerstörern und Torpedobooten 1914 bis 1939 (in German). Herford, Germany: Koehlers Verlagsgesellschaft mBH. ISBN 3-7822-0207-4.
- Firle, Rudolph (1921). Der Krieg in der Ostsee: Erster Band: Von Kriegsbeginn bis Mitte März 1915. Der Krieg zur See: 1914–1918 (in German). Berlin: Verlag von E. S. Mittler und Sohn.
- Gardiner, Robert; Gray, Randal, eds. (1985). Conway's All The World's Fighting Ships 1906–1921. London: Conway Maritime Press. ISBN 0-85177-245-5.
- Groos, O. (1923). Der Krieg in der Nordsee: Dritter Band: Von Ende November 1914 bis Unfang Februar 1915. Der Krieg zur See: 1914–1918 (in German). Berlin: Verlag von E. S. Mittler und Sohn – via National Library of Estonia.
- Gröner, Erich (1983). Die deutschen Kriegsschiffe 1815–1945: Band 2: Torpedoboote, Zerstörer, Schnelleboote, Minensuchboote, Minenräumboote. Koblenz, Germany: Bernard & Graefe Verlag. ISBN 3-7637-4801-6.
- Rollmann, Heinrich (1929). Der Krieg in der Ostsee: Zweiter Band: Das Kreigjahr 1915. Der Krieg zur See: 1914–1918 (in German). Berlin: Verlag von E. S. Mittler und Sohn.
