= TSS The Queen =

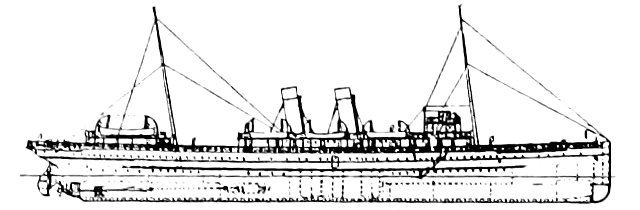
- Drawing of The Queen

History

United Kingdom
- Name: The Queen
- Owner: South Eastern and Chatham Railway
- Port of registry: (United Kingdom) London
- Route: Dover – Calais (1903–07); Folkestone – Boulogne (1907–14)
- Builder: Wm Denny & Bros, Dumbarton
- Yard number: 682
- Launched: 4 April 1903
- Completed: June 1903
- Maiden voyage: 27 June 1903
- Identification: UK official number 118293; code letters VCPH; call sign SEQ (by 1913); call sign GUN (from 1914)
- Fate: Sunk by torpedo, 26 October 1916

General characteristics
- Tonnage: 1,676 GRT, 695 NRT
- Length: 309.9 ft (94.5 m)
- Beam: 40.0 ft (12.2 m)
- Depth: 15.7 ft (4.8 m)
- Installed power: 800 RHP
- Propulsion: 3 × screws; 3 × steam turbines
- Speed: 21 knots (39 km/h)

The Queen was an English Channel passenger ferry that was built in 1903 and sunk in 1916. She was the South Eastern and Chatham Railway (SECR)'s first steam turbine ship.

In 1908 The Queen was damaged in a collision with another SECR ferry. Early in the First World War she was a troop ship. In 1916 she was captured by one German destroyer and then sunk by another.

== Building ==
William Denny and Brothers built The Queen at Dumbarton as yard number 682. She was launched on 4 April 1903 and completed that June. Her registered length was 309.9 ft (94.5 m), her beam was 40.0 ft (12.2 m) and her depth was 15.7 ft (4.8 m). Her tonnages were 1,676 GRT and 695 NRT.

She had three propellers, each powered by a Parsons steam turbine. Between them they were rated at 800 RHP and gave her a speed of 21 knots (39 km/h).

== Identification ==
The Queen's UK official number was 118293 and her code letters were VCPH. By 1913 she was equipped for wireless telegraphy and her call sign was SEQ. In 1914 this was changed to GUN.

== History ==
The Queen entered service on the Dover – Calais route, making her maiden voyage on 27 June 1903. In 1907 she was transferred to the Folkestone – Boulogne route. On 1 June 1908 The Queen and another SECR ferry, Onward, collided in thick fog. Both ships were badly damaged.

In 1914 The Queen helped evacuate Belgian refugees from Ostend. She later became a troop ship. On 26 October 1914 she rescued more than 2,000 people from the Chargeurs Réunis ship Amiral Ganteaume, which had been damaged by torpedo. In September 1916 The Queen towed the damaged troop ship Queen Empress to safety.

On 26 October 1916 the German V25-class torpedo boat V-80 captured The Queen about 3 nautical miles (6 km) from the Varne Lightvessel. V-80's sister ship S-60 then sank The Queen by torpedo at 50°54′N 1°19′E.
