= HMS Lawford (1913) =

Destroyer of the Royal Navy

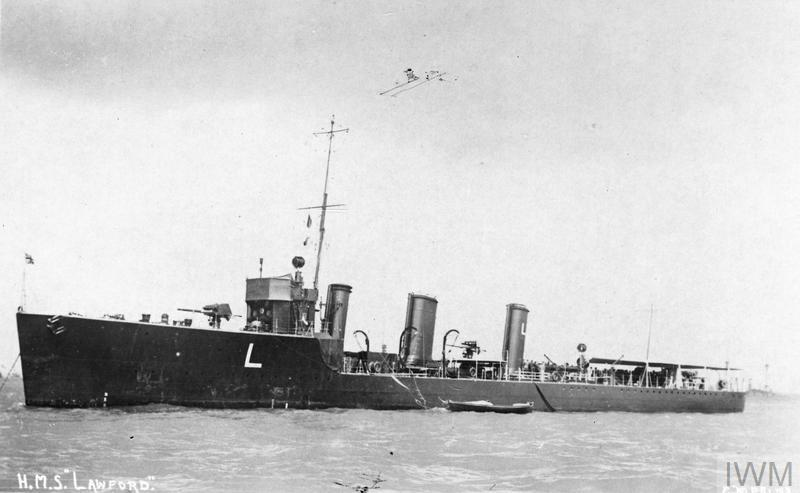
- Lawford

History

United Kingdom
- Name: HMS Lawford
- Ordered: 29 March 1912
- Builder: Fairfield Shipbuilding and Engineering Company
- Laid down: 28 September 1912
- Launched: 30 October 1913
- Commissioned: March 1914
- Fate: Sold 24 August 1922

General characteristics
- Class & type: Laforey-class destroyer
- Displacement: 965–1,300 long tons (980–1,321 t)
- Length: 269 ft (82 m)
- Beam: 26 ft 9 in (8.15 m)
- Draught: 9 ft 6 in (2.90 m)
- Installed power: 24,500 shp (18,300 kW)
- Propulsion: 2 × Parsons steam turbines; water-tube boilers; 2 × shafts
- Speed: 29 kn (33 mph; 54 km/h)
- Complement: 73
- Armament: 3 × QF 4-inch (102 mm) Mk IV guns; 1 × QF 2-pounder (40 mm) AA pom-pom Mk. II gun; 4 × 21-inch (533 mm) torpedo tubes (2x2)

HMS Lawford was a Laforey-class destroyer of the British Royal Navy. The Laforey class (or L class) was the class of destroyers ordered under the Royal Navy's 1912–1913 construction programme, which were armed with three 4-inch (102 mm) guns and four torpedo tubes and were capable of 29 knots (54 km/h; 33 mph). The ship, which was originally to be named Ivanhoe but was renamed before launch, was built by the Scottish shipbuilder Fairfields between 1912 and 1914.

Lawford was in service for the whole of the First World War. Initially she was part of the Harwich Force, operating in the North Sea and English Channel, and taking part in the Battle of Heligoland Bight in 1914 and the Battle of Dogger Bank in 1915. In September 1915, she transferred to the Mediterranean, taking part in the Gallipoli Campaign before returning to the Harwich Force in June 1916. She took part in the Battle of Dover Strait in October 1916 and in January 1918 transferred to Devonport where she was employed on convoy escort duties until the end of the war. Lawford was sold for scrap in 1922.

== Construction and design ==
For the 1912–1913 shipbuilding programme for the Royal Navy, the British Admiralty ordered twenty destroyers to a design based on a modified version of the previous year's Acasta-class destroyer, with the major difference being an increased torpedo armament of four torpedo tubes rather than two. Four of the destroyers were ordered from Yarrow, with four more from Fairfield, and two each from Denny, Parsons, Swan Hunter, Thonycroft, White and Beardmore.

The destroyers were 268 feet 10 inches (81.9 m) overall and 260 feet 0 inches (79.2 m) between perpendiculars, with a beam of 27 feet 6 inches (8.4 m) and a draught of 10 feet 10 inches (3.3 m). Displacement of the class ranged from 965 long tons (980 t) to 1,010 long tons (1,030 t) normal and 1,150 long tons (1,170 t) to 1,300 long tons (1,300 t) deep load, with Lawford having a normal displacement of 1,003 long tons (1,019 t). Four Yarrow boilers fed steam at 250 pounds per square inch (1,700 kPa) to two sets of Brown-Curtis impulse steam turbines. The machinery was rated at 24,500 shaft horsepower (18,300 kW), giving a speed of 29 knots (54 km/h; 33 mph). The ship had two funnels.

The ships were armed with three 4-inch (102 mm) QF Mk IV guns, with a single .303-inch (8 mm) Maxim machine gun. Two twin 21-inch (533 mm) torpedo tubes were fitted. The ships were built with fittings to carry four mines, but these were never used. The ship's crew was 73 officers and ratings.

The second of the four Fairfield-built destroyers, Ivanhoe was laid down at Fairfield's Govan yard on 28 September 1912. On 30 September 1913, the 1912–1913 destroyers, which were previously to be known as the Rob Roy class, were redesignated the L or Laforey class, with the ships given new names string with the letter L. Ivanhoe was renamed Lawford for Sir John Lawford, a naval officer who served in the Napoleonic Wars. Lawford was launched on 30 October 1913 and completed in March 1914.

== Service ==
On commissioning, Lawford joined the 3rd Destroyer Flotilla as part of the First Fleet. On the outbreak of the First World War this Flotilla became part of the Harwich Force, under the overall command of Commodore Reginald Tyrwhitt, which operated in the southern North Sea and could reinforce the Grand Fleet or forces in the English Channel as required.

On 28 August 1914, the Harwich Force, supported by light cruisers and battlecruisers of the Grand Fleet, carried out a raid towards Heligoland with the intention of destroying patrolling German torpedo boats. Lawford formed part of the 3nd Division of the Third Flotilla during this operation. Lawford launched a torpedo against the German light cruiser Frauenlob, but it missed. She fired 238 lyddite and 52 common shells out of a total allocation of 360 rounds In total, three German light cruisers (Mainz, Cöln and Ariadne) and one destroyer (V187) was sunk at the cost of damage to the British cruiser HMS Arethusa and three destroyers. On 2 November Lawford accompanied the light cruiser Aurora and the destroyers Lark and Laverock on a search for German submarines on the Broad Fourteens. Lawford was forced to return to Harwich during the day owing to Condenser leaks. On 16 December 1914, German cruisers shelled the coastal towns of Scarborough, Hartlepool, West Hartlepool and Whitby. The British were warned of the German attack by the codebreakers of Room 40, and deployed ships from the Grand Fleet and from the Harwich Force (including Lawford) to counter the Germans. While there was a brief clash between destroyers supporting the Grand Fleet detachment and the Germans, the Harwich Force was not engaged.

On 23 January 1915, the German battlecruisers made a sortie to attack British fishing boats on the Dogger Bank. British Naval Intelligence was again warned of the raid by radio messages decoded by Room 40, and sent out the Battlecruiser Force from Rosyth and the Harwich Force to intercept the German force. Lawford was part of the 1st Division of the Third Flotilla when it sailed as part of the Harwich Force. This resulted in the Battle of Dogger Bank, which took the form of a high speed chase of the German ships. The majority of the destroyers of the Harwich Force, including Lawford, were not fast enough to keep up with the battlecruisers. Only seven destroyers of the M class were fast enough to engage the German warships.

On 30 January 1915, Lawford was one of eight destroyers of the Harwich Force (Note: Lawford, Lydiard, Lucifer, Lookout, Loyal, Laurel, Laertes and Llewellyn) that, together with the light cruiser Undaunted were ordered to the Irish Sea in response to a series of attacks by the German submarine U-21 on shipping near Liverpool. Lawford, along with the other destroyers, arrived at Milford Haven on 2 February and was soon placed on patrol duty to search for the large number of submarines that were believed to be active in the Irish Sea, but U-21, which in fact was the only submarine involved, had already departed for Germany by the time search operations began. Escort duties were a major part of Lawford's duties, with the ship one of four destroyers from the 3rd Flotilla ordered to Avonmouth on 1 March to escort transports carrying troops to the Mediterranean on the initial leg of their journey. On 4 March Lawford and Lydiard set out from Avonmouth escorting the troopship SS Dongola. That night all three ships ran aground on the Welsh coast, forcing the journey to be abandoned, with the two destroyers being docked at Newport, Wales for repair. On 1 May 1915, the German submarine SM UB-6 torpedoed and sank the old British destroyer Recruit near the Galloper Light Vessel, off the Thames Estuary. Four destroyers of the Harwich Force, Lawford, Laforey, Lark and Leonidas set out to hunt for Recruit's assailant. Meanwhile, two German torpedo boats, A-2 and A-6, which had been searching for a German floatplane which had ditched, encountered four British trawlers near the Noordhinder Bank. One of the trawlers, Columbia was sunk by a German torpedo, but the remaining three trawlers survived, with the two German torpedo boats breaking off the attack when the four British destroyers of the Lark group approached. The torpedo boats, which were small coastal boats of the A class which were outclassed by the British ships, attempted to flee to neutral waters, but were soon caught and sunk by gunfire.

In September 1915, Lawford was one of four destroyers ordered to leave the 3rd Flotilla for the Mediterranean, joining the 5th Destroyer Flotilla of the Mediterranean Fleet. Lawford took part in the evacuation from Cape Helles at the end of the Gallipoli Campaign on 8–9 January 1916. Lawford remained part of the 5th Flotilla until March 1916, but by June that year had returned to British waters and rejoined the Harwich Force as part of the 9th Destroyer Flotilla.

On 1 June 1916, the Harwich Force sortied to reinforce the Grand Fleet following the Battle of Jutland. Lawford was one of eight destroyers detached to screen the damaged battleship Marlborough, which had been torpedoed during the battle, helping to escort the battleship to the Humber for temporary repair. The destroyers of the Harwich Force were regularly detached to the Channel to strengthen the defences of the Dover Patrol against potential attack by German surface forces, and in late October 1916, Lawford led a division of four destroyers (Note: Lawford, Lark, Lance and Lochinvar) that was taking its turn reinforcing the Dover Patrol. On the night of 26/27 October 1916, Lawford's division was patrolling off The Downs, while four more L-class destroyers were on passage to Dunkirk, and six more destroyers waited at Dover. On that night the Germans launched an attack against the Dover Barrage and shipping in the Straits. One group of German torpedo boats attacked British drifters on the Barrage, and when the old destroyer Flirt went to investigate, sank Flirt. As a response, six Tribal-class destroyers from Dover and Laforey's division of four destroyers from Dunkirk were ordered to sortie out in an attempt to intercept the German ships. In a confused action, the Tribal-class destroyer Nubian was torpedoed and badly damaged, having her bow blown off, while Amazon and Mohawk were damaged by German gunfire, with the German ships escaping with little damage. Lawford's commanding officer misinterpreted his orders, and on hearing reports of the German attacks, took his division of destroyers south east to investigate, leaving the Downs unguarded. A subsequent order to return to base was instead sent to Laforey, which abandoned her pursuit of the German warships. Lawford's division encountered Nubian which was disabled and firing distress flares, and Lark took Nubian under a stern-first tow. Bad weather caused the tow line to break, however, and Nubian ran aground under the South Foreland.

On 25 February 1917, Lawford was one of ten destroyers waiting on stand-by at Dover when German torpedo boats launched another raid on the Dover Barrage and shipping in the Channel. The raid was ineffective, with a clash between the patrolling destroyer Laverock causing one group of German torpedo boats to turn back, while a second group of German torpedo boats shelled Margate and Westgate-on-Sea, destroying a house and killing a woman and two children. The stand-by destroyers were ordered to form a patrol line in the channel in response, but saw nothing. In March 1917, the 9th Destroyer Flotilla was split up, with the newer destroyers joining the 10th Destroyer Flotilla, and the L-class ships being dispersed to different units, with Lawford joining the 7th Destroyer Flotilla operating on the East coast of Britain. Lawford was modified to carry modern H-type mines in 1917, and by August 1917 was listed as one of four (Note: Lawford, Ferret, Legion and Loyal) minelaying destroyers in the 7th Flotilla.

During January 1918, Lawford transferred to the 4th Destroyer Flotilla based at Devonport, with the Flotilla being employed in convoy escort duties. At the end of the war on 11 November 1918, Lawford was temporarily detached from the 4th Flotilla to the 3rd Destroyer Flotilla of the Grand Fleet, but by December had returned to the 4th Flotilla.

== Disposal ==
After the end of the war, the Royal Navy rapidly reduced in size, and by March 1919, Lawford was in reserve at the Nore. She was sold for scrap to Hayes of Porthcawl, South Wales on 24 August 1922.

== Pennant numbers ==
Pennant number	Date
H.06	1914
H.53	January 1918
