= Action off Noordhinder Bank =

1915 naval battle

- Part of the First World War
- North Sea map
Date	1 May 1915
Location	off Noordhinder Bank, the Netherlands, North Sea 51°39′N 02°41′E
Result	British victory

Belligerents
United Kingdom	German Empire

Commanders and leaders
(United Kingdom of Great Britain and Ireland) Sir James Domville	(German Empire) Hermann Schoemann †

Strength
4 naval trawlers; 6 destroyers	2 torpedo boats; 1 submarine

Casualties and losses
1 destroyer sunk; 1 naval trawler sunk; 1 naval trawler damaged; 50 dead	2 torpedo boats sunk; 13 dead; 46 captured
- Location within North Sea

The Action off Noordhinder Bank on 1 May 1915 was a naval engagement between four British naval trawlers, supported by a flotilla of four destroyers and a pair of German torpedo boats from the Flanders Flotilla. The two torpedo boats were sent to rescue the crew of a reconnaissance seaplane that had been forced down with engine trouble, then to attack the trawlers. Four British destroyers from the Harwich Force were sent to patrol in the southern North Sea after a destroyer was torpedoed and sunk by a U-boat.

The Germans engaged the trawlers, sank Columbia with a torpedo and return-fire from the three surviving trawlers damaged one torpedo boat that temporarily lost steam. The four British destroyers from the Harwich Force appeared and the torpedo boats turned for home. The destroyers engaged the torpedo boats and sank them. The loss of the two new A-class torpedo boats greatly demoralised the German Flanders naval flotilla.

The commanders of the Imperial German Navy (Kaiserliche Marine) realised that the Flanders Flotilla was inadequately armed to protect the coast, let alone harass British shipping in the English Channel. After similar defeats, the A-class torpedo boats were relegated to coastal patrol and heavier V25-class torpedo boats were transferred to the flotilla.

== Background ==
After the 7th Torpedo Boat Half Flotilla was lost during the Battle off Texel (17 October 1914) German naval authorities were reluctant to commit forces for offensive operations off the coast of Flanders. Admiral Ludwig von Schröder, the commander of Marine Corps Flanders (MarineKorps Flandern), kept pressure on the German naval command for the transfer of a force of submarines and torpedo boats to his command. After several months, the Kaiserliche Marine (Imperial German Navy) relented and decided to send him a force of new coastal submarines of the UB and UC (minelayer) types and new A-class torpedo boats.

The torpedo boats had been designed in late 1914, built at Hamburg and transported, in sections, overland to Antwerp, like the UB and UC coastal submarines. The new A-class boats displaced a little over 100 long tons (100 t), had a speed of about 20 knots (37 km/h; 23 mph), carried two torpedoes, a 5 cm SK L/40 gun and could stow four naval mines. The Flanders Torpedo Boat Flotilla, based in Zeebrugge, was formed on 28 April 1915. Comprising 15 of the A-class boats, rather than the anticipated 50, the flotilla was put under the command of Korvettenkapitän Hermann Schoemann.

== Prelude ==
=== HMS Recruit ===
Operations of the U-boats based at Zeebrugge began with a sortie by UB-4 which sank four ships and returned during a storm, allaying concerns that the small coastal Type UB I submarines lacked seaworthiness; UB-6 sailed on 1 May 1915. That day, two British destroyers, HMS Recruit and HMS Brazen of the Nore local defence flotilla, were patrolling about 30 nmi (56 km; 35 mi) south-west of the Galloper lightship, which marked the Galloper shoal, the most distant maritime hazards of the Thames estuary. The shoal was about 30 nmi (56 km; 35 mi) to the south-west of the Noordhinder Bank light vessel. At 11:20 a.m. Recruit was hit by a torpedo from UB-6. The destroyer broke in two and sank at once; 34 members of the crew were killed and 26 survived, to be rescued by a Dutch ship.

Brazen and one of the Harwich trawlers began an abortive search for the submarine until 3:00 a.m. by when they had returned to the Noordhinder light. Four trawlers from Great Yarmouth were searching for a U-boat reported in the area the day before. Miura (Sub-Lieutenant L. W. Kersley, RNR) was north-east of the Noordhinder lightship, Chirsit (Sub-Lieutenant A. Stablefold, RNR) was to the south-east of the lightship and Columbia (Lieutenant-Commander W. H. Hawthorne, RNR) about 4 nmi (7.4 km; 4.6 mi) to the west-north-west of the light. The trawler Barbados which carried the flotilla commander, Lieutenant Sir James Domville RN, the senior ship of the four, was to the west-north-west, beyond Columbia. At about the same time that Recruit was torpedoed, Columbia was attacked by another U-boat at Thornton Ridge, off the Scheldt estuary at 51°34’N, 03°00’E but the torpedo missed.

=== German sortie ===
Admiralty Chart No 3371 Dunkerque to Hook of Holland (1949) [enlargeable] Noordhinder Bank near left margin

Early on 1 May 1915, two German seaplanes departed Zeebrugge to reconnoitre the Thames Estuary but one of the aircraft had engine trouble and made a forced landing. The other seaplane crew reported four British trawlers north of Ostend, off the Noordhinder Bank, a shoal between Antwerp and the mouth of the Thames. Schoemann sailed with the torpedo boats SMS A2 and A6 to rescue the crew and destroy the trawlers. The crew of the seaplane was rescued by a Dutch freighter and taken to the Noordhinder lightship, whence they were returned to land by a U-boat.

== Action ==
At about 3:00 p.m. A2 and A6 were seen heading towards the British trawlers from the west-south-west, with no flags visible. At about 500 yd (460 m) range they ran up German flags and the foremost ship launched a torpedo at Columbia but missed. Barbados opened fire and soon afterwards another torpedo hit Columbia on the port side below the wheelhouse, sinking the trawler. Two torpedoes passed close to Barbados and the trawlers were engaged by machine-gun and gun fire. Chirsit and Miura returned fire at long range and one of the torpedo boats veered towards Chirsit. Despite being slower and outgunned, the trawler crews fought on; the captain of Barbados was wounded early in the action and Domville took over in the wheelhouse. The Germans aimed at the wheelhouse, wounding Domville with splinters and knocking him down several times. After exchanging fire for about twenty minutes, the nearest of the two torpedo boats moved off to about 1,200 yd (1,100 m), began to lose steam and came to a stop. Barbados steamed closer but the crew got the engine going and both torpedo-boats withdrew to the south-south-east.

When the loss of Recruit had been reported, Harwich Force had sent the Laforey-class destroyers, HMS Laforey, Lawford, Leonidas and Lark to hunt for the U-boat. Thirty minutes after the German ships moved off, Barbados, with its gun and siren, attracted the attention of Leonidas, which arrived from the south-west and with the other three destroyers gave chase. Barbados began a search for survivors from Columbia to find that Miura had rescued the only man, a deckhand, who reported that Columbia had broken in two when torpedoed and sank almost immediately. He reported that the Germans had continued to fire at men in the water. The four British destroyers began to fire at long range and sank the torpedo-boats about an hour later. The British rescued 46 survivors from the German ships of the 59 crew, who related how they had taken three men from Columbia's crew and locked them away, failing to release them as the ship sank. A German sailor had been swept overboard and was thrown a lifebuoy (marked A6) and was rescued by the Norwegian SS Varild, transferred to Miura and questioned.

== Aftermath ==
=== Analysis ===
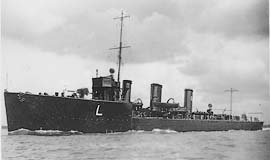
HMS Leonidas

The loss of the torpedo boats showed Schroeder the limitations of the A-class torpedo boats; they were too poorly armed for raiding and the boats were relegated to coastal patrols. The defeat at Noordhinder allowed Schroeder's pleas for reinforcements finally to be heard by the German Admiralty and on 22 May another six A-class torpedo boats were ordered from the manufacturers for Flanders. Kapitänleutnant Kurt Assman was transferred to command of the Flanders Flotilla torpedo boats which was split into two half-flotillas. The next engagement involving an A-class torpedo boat took place on 22 August against two French destroyers, in which A15 damaged one destroyer but was sunk with the loss of fifteen of the 27 crew, reinforced the perception that the class was too slow and under-gunned.

Several new boats were put in reserve to provide crews for the V25-class torpedo boats SMS V47, SMS V67 and SMS V68 transferred from the III Torpedo Boat Flotilla that November. The British took the incident to be a hit-and-run attack, assuming that the seaplane patrol that morning had alerted Zeebrugge and had led to the German sortie against the trawlers. The 3-pounder gun on Barbados had been well handled by Petty Officer A. H. Hallett and that the deck and engine-room crews had shown great courage. Miura and Chirsit were commended for the effectiveness of their long-range fire, which had been of great support to Barbados and forced the Germans to retire. The Admiralty passed on its appreciation to the trawlers for fighting a superior force so vigorously.

=== Casualties ===
British losses included Columbia sunk and Barbados damaged; Columbia suffered 16 crew killed with only a deckhand being rescued after the action. The Germans lost A2 and A6 along with 13 men killed (including Schoemann) and 46 rescued and taken prisoner. A scandal ensued after it was discovered from the captured Germans that the three men taken from the sinking Columbia had been locked away below decks on one of the torpedo boats and were abandoned when the German vessel started to sink. The Germans reported that they did not have enough time to get to the British prisoners and were barely able to escape themselves.

== Orders of battle ==
=== British trawlers ===
Yarmouth trawlers
Name	Flag	Class	Notes
HMT Columbia	Royal Navy	Auxiliary Patrol	Anti-submarine patrol, Sunk by torpedo
HMT Barbados	Royal Navy	Auxiliary Patrol	Anti-submarine patrol, flag, Lieutenant Sir James Domville
HMT Chirsit	Royal Navy	Auxiliary Patrol	Anti-submarine patrol
HMT Miura	Royal Navy	Auxiliary Patrol	Anti-submarine patrol

=== British destroyers ===
Nore defence flotilla destroyers
Name	Flag	Class	Notes
HMS Brazen	Royal Navy	C-class destroyer	
HMS Recruit	Royal Navy	C-class destroyer	Sunk by SM UB-6

Harwich Force destroyers
Name	Flag	Class	Notes
HMS Laforey	Royal Navy	Laforey-class destroyer	
HMS Lawford	Royal Navy	Laforey-class destroyer	
HMS Leonidas	Royal Navy	Laforey-class destroyer	
HMS Lark	Royal Navy	Laforey-class destroyer	

=== German ships ===
Flanders Flotilla
Name	Flag	Class	Notes
SMS A2	Imperial German Navy	A1-class torpedo boat	
SMS A6	Imperial German Navy	A1-class torpedo boat	Sank trawler Columbia

=== Other vessels ===
Miscellaneous vessels
Name	Flag	Class	Notes
SS Varild	Norway	Merchant ship	Neutral, rescued German man overboard, transferred him to Miura
—	Netherlands	Merchant ship	Neutral, rescued 26 survivors of Recruit
