= HMS Lucifer (1913) =

Destroyer of the Royal Navy

History

United Kingdom
- Name: HMS Lucifer
- Ordered: 29 March 1912
- Builder: Parsons Marine Steam Turbine Company, Wallsend, hull sub-contracted to Hawthorn Leslie, Hebburn
- Laid down: 26 September 1912
- Launched: 29 December 1913
- Commissioned: August 1914
- Fate: Sold 1 December 1921

General characteristics
- Class & type: Laforey-class destroyer
- Displacement: 965–1,300 long tons (980–1,321 t)
- Length: 269 ft (82 m)
- Beam: 26 ft 9 in (8.15 m)
- Draught: 9 ft 6 in (2.90 m)
- Installed power: 24,500 shp (18,300 kW)
- Propulsion: 2 × Parsons steam turbines; water-tube boilers; 2 × shafts
- Speed: 29 kn (33 mph; 54 km/h)
- Complement: 73
- Armament: 3 × QF 4-inch (102 mm) Mk IV guns; 1 × QF 2-pounder (40 mm) AA pom-pom Mk. II gun; 4 × 21-inch (533 mm) torpedo tubes (2x2)

HMS Lucifer was a Laforey-class destroyer of the British Royal Navy. The Laforey class (or L class) was a class of destroyers ordered under the Royal Navy's 1912–1913 construction programme, which were armed with three 4-inch (102 mm) guns and four torpedo tubes and were required to reach speeds of 29 knots (54 km/h; 33 mph). Lucifer was built by the engineering firm Parsons, with the hull subcontracted to Hawthorn Leslie. The ship was launched on 29 December 1913, and was completed in August 1914, just after the start of the First World War.

Lucifer joined the Harwich Force, and took part in the Battle of Heligoland Bight on 28 August 1914 and the Battle of Dogger Bank on 24 January 1915. The destroyer transferred to the Dover Patrol in March 1917 and to the Firth of Forth for convoy duties in February 1918. Lucifer was sold for scrap in December 1921.

== Design ==
For the 1912–1913 shipbuilding programme for the Royal Navy, the British Admiralty planned to order twenty destroyers to a design based on a modified version of the previous year's Acasta-class destroyer, with the major difference being an increased torpedo armament of four torpedo tubes rather than two. The engineering firm Parsons Marine Steam Turbine Company proposed the use of geared steam turbines rather than the direct drive turbines used by other shipbuilders, which would be more efficient, with propellers running at a slower speed, and the ship needing less power to reach the required speed. On 29 March 1913, Parsons received an order for two destroyers, initially to be called Rob Roy and Rocket. While Parsons would build the ships' machinery, construction of the hulls was subcontracted to Hawthorn Leslie. 14 more destroyers with conventional direct-drive turbines were ordered that day, with four more ordered later that year.

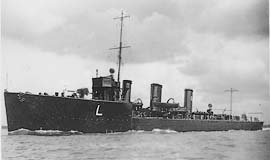
Sister ship Leonidas

The destroyers were 268 feet 10 inches (81.9 m) overall and 260 feet 0 inches (79.2 m) between perpendiculars, with a beam of 27 feet 6 inches (8.4 m) and a draught of 10 feet 10 inches (3.3 m). Displacement of the class ranged from 965 long tons (980 t) to 1,010 long tons (1,030 t) normal and 1,150 long tons (1,170 t) to 1,300 long tons (1,300 t) deep load, with Lucifer having a normal displacement of 987 long tons (1,003 t). Four Yarrow boilers fed steam to two sets of Parsons geared steam turbines, with the machinery rated at 22,500 shp (16,800 kW). Maximum speed was 29 kn (33 mph; 54 km/h). The ship had three funnels.

The ships were armed with three 4-inch (102 mm) QF Mk IV guns, with a single .303-inch (7.7 mm) Maxim machine gun. Two twin 21-inch (533 mm) torpedo tubes were fitted. The ships were built with fittings to carry four mines, but these were never used. The ship's crew was 73 officers and ratings.

== Construction ==
The two destroyers ordered from Parsons were laid down at Hawthorn Leslie's Hebburn, South Tyneside shipyard on 26 October 1912. On 30 September 1913, the 1912–1913 destroyers, which were previously to be known as the Rob Roy class, were redesignated the L or Laforey class, with the ships given new names beginning with the letter L. The ship that was to be called Rocket was renamed Lucifer. Lucifer was launched on 29 December that year. After fitting out at Palmers' Jarrow works, Lucifer completed in August 1914.

== Service ==
=== 1914 ===
On commissioning, Lucifer, like the rest of the Laforey class, joined the Harwich Force, which operated in the southern North Sea and could reinforce the Grand Fleet or forces in the English Channel as required. On 28 August 1914, the Harwich Force, with Lucifer part of the 2nd Division of the 1st Destroyer Flotilla, carried out a sortie into the southeastern part of the North Sea near the German Coast, known as the Heligoland Bight in an attempt to ambush German cruisers and destroyers. This developed into the Battle of Heligoland Bight where three German cruisers (Mainz, Cöln and Ariadne) and one destroyer (V187) was sunk at the cost of damage to the British cruiser HMS Arethusa and three destroyers (Laurel, Liberty and Laertes). Lucifer was undamaged in the action.

One of the duties of the Harwich force was, in conjunction with the old cruisers of the 7th Cruiser Squadron, to patrol the Dogger Bank and Broad Fourteens. On 17 September 1914, bad weather caused the destroyers supporting the cruisers to be withdrawn, leaving the cruisers to patrol the Broad Fourteens alone. At 05:00 on the morning of 22 September, Admiral Reginald Tyrwhitt, aboard the light cruiser Lowestoft, led 8 destroyers out of Harwich on course for the Broad Fourteens. Before they could reach the cruisers, the German submarine U-9 torpedoed and sank the cruisers Aboukir, Hogue and Cressy. The ships from the Harwich Force arrived on the scene of the sinking at 10:45, almost three hours after the last ship sank, and four of the destroyers, including Lucifer, picked up survivors that had been rescued by trawlers and boats from the cruisers, while the other four destroyers guarded against submarine attack.

On 24 October 1914, Lucifer set out from Harwich as part of the escort for the seaplane carriers Engadine and Empress on a raid against the German airship base at Cuxhaven. The force reached the launch-off point off Heligoland on the morning of 25 October, but poor weather meant that only two of the six seaplanes managed to take-off, both of which quickly abandoned the mission. On 16 December 1914, German cruisers shelled the coastal towns of Scarborough, Hartlepool, West Hartlepool and Whitby. The British were warned of the German attack by the codebreakers of Room 40, and deployed ships from the Grand Fleet and from the Harwich Force (including Lucifer) to counter the Germans. While there was a brief clash between destroyers supporting the Grand Fleet detachment and the Germans, the Harwich Force was not engaged.

=== 1915 ===
On 23 January 1915, German battlecruisers made a sortie to attack British fishing boats on the Dogger Bank. British Naval Intelligence was warned of the raid by radio messages decoded by Room 40, and sent out the Battlecruiser Force from Rosyth and the Harwich Force to intercept the German force. Lucifer, now part of the 2nd Division of the 3rd Destroyer Flotilla, sailed with the Harwich Force. This resulted in the Battle of Dogger Bank, which took the form of a high speed chase of the German ships. The majority of the destroyers of the Harwich Force, including Landrail, were not fast enough to keep up with the battlecruisers. Only seven destroyers of the M class were fast enough to engage the German warships. The German armoured cruiser Blücher was sunk in the battle, but the rest of the German force escaped.

On 30 January 1915, Lucifer was one of eight destroyers of the Harwich Force (Note: Lucifer, Laertes, Lawford, Laurel, Lookout, Loyal, Llewellyn and Lydiard) that, together with the light cruiser Undaunted were ordered to the Irish Sea in response to a series of attacks by the German submarine U-21 on shipping near Liverpool. Lucifer, along with the other destroyers, arrived at Milford Haven on 1 February and was soon placed on patrol duty to search for the large number of submarines that were believed to be active in the Irish Sea, but U-21, which in fact was the only submarine involved, had already departed for Germany by the time search operations began. From 7 to 12 February, the destroyers from Harwich were employed escorting ships carrying the 1st Canadian Division on the first part of their passage from Avonmouth to Saint-Nazaire, with no interference from German forces, following which the ships were recalled to Harwich. On 27 March, Lucifer, along with Laurel, Leonidas and Liberty, was ordered to patrol the Hoofden to look for German submarines that had been reported to be threatening steamers on the Harwich–Rotterdam route. On 28 March, the four destroyers sighted a submarine, and six more destroyers (Mentor, Manly, Morris, Milne, Mastiff and Murray) were sent from Harwich to reinforce the patrol, but soon after the two groups of destroyers joined up, the whole force was recalled to base as radio intercepts indicated that German battlecruisers were about to sortie. On 22 April 1915, Lucifer, along with Laverock, Linnet and Lydiard, were despatched from Harwich to Pembroke for more escort operations, and during their passage escorted the battleship Orion to Devonport for a refit. Their duties once in the Irish Sea were to escort transports carrying the 10th (Irish) Division from Dublin to Liverpool, with the operations continuing from 27 April to 5 May, again without any German interference. The destroyers then returned to Harwich. Lucifer, along with most of the rest of the Harwich Force, was employed in anti-submarine operations at the west end of the English Channel, covering the arrival of troops from Canada and the despatch of troops to the Dardanelles campaign.

On 11 July 1915, Lucifer, together with Laurel, Leonidas and Liberty, was ordered to patrol off Texel, to attempt to intercept German steamers which were stuck in Rotterdam, and were rumoured to be preparing to make a run for Germany. The German ships remained in port and the four destroyers returned to port on 13 July. In September 1915, the 3rd Destroyer Flotilla was renumbered the 9th Destroyer Flotilla, still remaining part of the Harwich Force, with Lucifer remaining part of the new formation. On 10 September 1915, Lucifer sailed from Harwich as part of the distant covering force for Operation CY, in which the minelayers Princess Margaret, Angora and Orvieto laid 1450 mines off the Amrum Bank.

=== 1916 ===
On 20 March 1916, a large air raid was launched against Zeebrugge, with 29 British, French and Belgian bombers attacking Zeebrugge airdrome and seven seaplanes from the seaplane carriers Riviera and Vindex attacked the seaplane base. Four Harwich destroyers, Lucifer, Lance, Linnet and Lookout, were ordered to patrol off the Belgian coast to rescue any seaplanes that ditched, and when returning, they encountered three German torpedo boats, V47, V67 and V68. Lance and Linnet were leading the British ships, and came under fire from the German torpedo boats, with Lance being hit and damaged, before Lucifer and Lookout came up and the Germans turned for shore, with the British destroyers breaking off the engagement when the Germans reached the protection of their coastal artillery. Both V47 and V68 were hit by the British ships. On 3 May 1916, Lucifer and Lark escorted Princess Margaret on Operation XX, a combined minelaying operation by Princess Margaret and the destroyer minelayer Abdiel and air raid by seaplanes from Engadine and Vindex against the German airship base at Tondern. (Note: Lucifer and Lark were the only destroyers of the Harwich force to take part in this operation. The Grand Fleet provided the bulk of the forces participating.) The minefields were successfully laid without German interference, although the light cruisers Galatea and Phaeton, supporting the operation, shot down the German airship L 7.

On 22 April 1916, Lucifer was one of twelve destroyers detached from the Harwich Force to support a large-scale operation to lay a mine and net barrage off the Belgian coast to counter operation of German submarines out of the Flanders ports. The operation started on 24 April, with Lucifer forming part of the escort for the minelaying force, but during that day, it was realised that German forces were about to carry out a raid against the east coast of England, and the Harwich Force destroyers escorting the barrage operation were ordered to rendezvous with the Harwich Force destroyers at sea and intercept the German force. They were not informed of a change of course of the Harwich Force, and did not manage to meet up in time to engage the German forces bombarding Yarmouth and Lowestoft.

On 19 August 1916, the German High Seas Fleet made a sortie into the North Sea with the intention of engaging units of the British Grand Fleet. The Harwich Force, including Lucifer, and the Grand Fleet both sortied to try and engage the German force, but no contact between the fleets occurred. On 26 October 1916, Lucifer, together with Laforey, Laurel and Liberty, were ordered to Dunkirk to guard against the possibility of German amphibious operations west of Nieuwpoort, Belgium, leaving Harwich at noon, and proceeding via Dover, before setting course for Dunkirk at 8:00 pm. Meanwhile, German torpedo boats launched an attack on the Dover Barrage and shipping in the Channel. One of the German groups of torpedo boats spotted Lucifer's division of destroyers during the British ships passage to Dunkirk, but the British destroyers did not see the Germans and no action followed. When reports of the German attacks were received at Dover, Lucifer's division was ordered out of Dunkirk in an attempt to intercept the Germans, but no contact was made.

=== 1917–1918 ===
Early in 1917, the 9th Destroyer Flotilla was split up, with the newer destroyers joining the 10th Destroyer Flotilla, and the L-class ships being dispersed to different units. Lucifer joined the 6th Destroyer Flotilla as part of the Dover Patrol on 1 March 1917. On the night of 17/18 March 1917, Lucifer was part of the reserve force on standby at Dover when the Germans launched another raid by torpedo boats against the Dover Barrage and shipping in the Channel. The reserve ships were ordered to sea after news reached Dover command that the destroyer Paragon was sunk and Llewellyn damaged by German torpedo boats, but they were recalled when it was reported that the destroyers had been attacked by submarines. On 20 April 1917, when German torpedo boats launched another raid on the Dover straits, Lucifer was again part of the reserve force on standby at Dover. The reserve force was ordered out after the German torpedo boats carried out an ineffective bombardment near Dover, but were ordered back to harbour as it was thought that the German ships had already escaped. As Lucifer, together with Lydiard and Mentor, was heading back to Dover, gunfire was observed, and the three destroyers turned towards the firing. The destroyers Broke and Swift had clashed with six German torpedo boats, with the German ships G42 and G85 sunk and Broke badly damaged. Mentor, Lydiard and Lucifer arrived on the scene after the battle had ended, (with Lucifer observing G42 sinking) and helped to pick up survivors from the two German ships.

Lucifer left the Dover Patrol on 2 June 1917, joining the 1st Destroyer Flotilla, based at Portsmouth. The destroyer remained part of the 1st Flotilla until January 1918, moving to the Firth of Forth by February that year and joining what became known as the Methil Convoy Flotilla. Lucifer remained part of the Methil Convoy Flotilla when the First World War ended on 11 November 1918.

=== Disposal ===
Lucifer was listed as in reserve at Devonport in March 1919. Lucifer was sold for scrap to Stanlee of Dover on 1 December 1921.

== Pennant numbers ==
Pennant Number	Date
H22	August 1914
H64	January 1918
