= HMS Laforey (1913) =

Royal Navy destroyer sunk by a mine off Sussex

Coordinates: 50°38′36″N 0°13′48″W

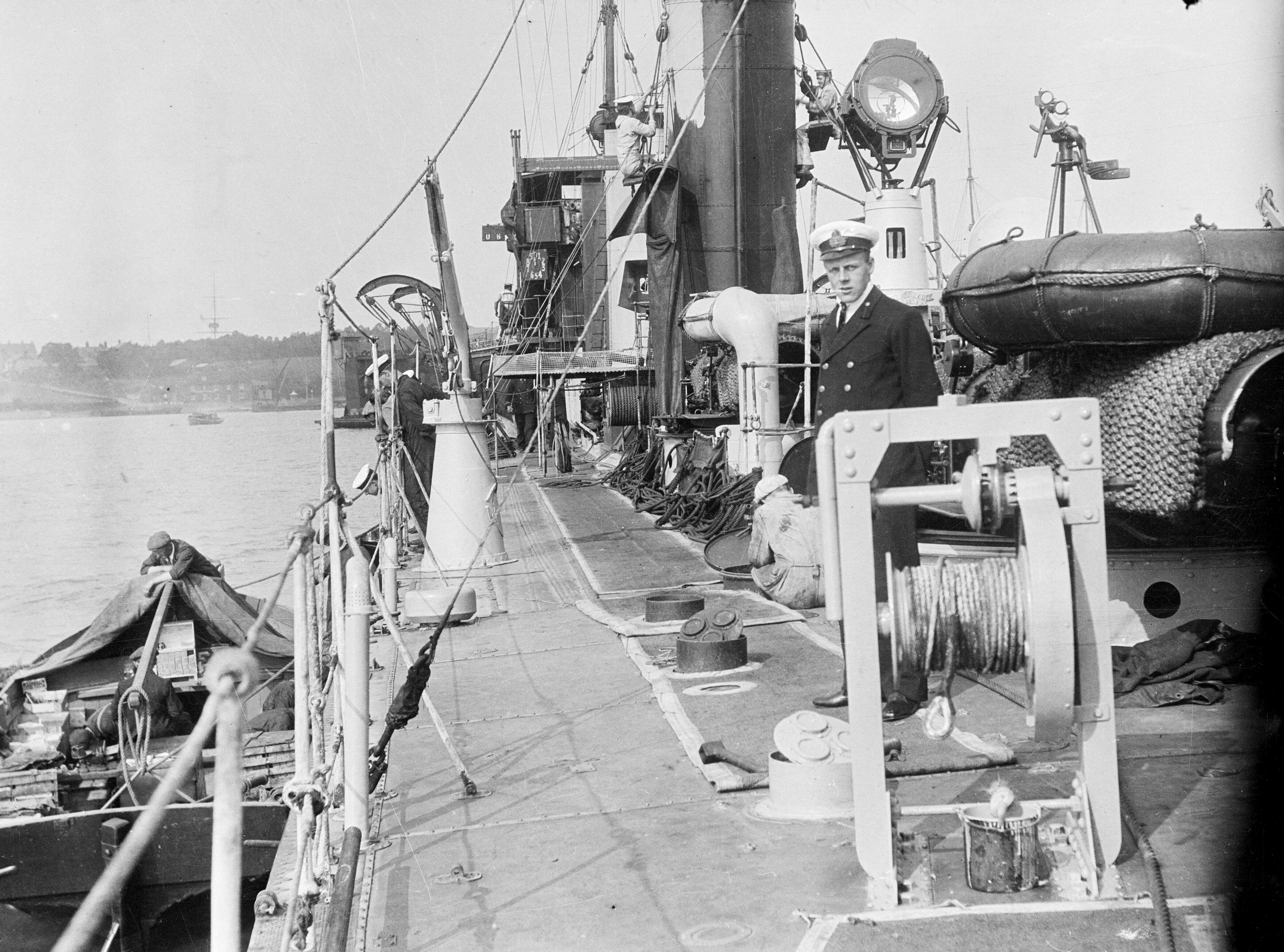
- On board the destroyer Laforey at moorings in Harwich harbour

History

United Kingdom
- Name: HMS Laforey
- Namesake: Francis Laforey
- Ordered: 29 March 1912
- Builder: Fairfield Shipbuilding and Engineering Company
- Laid down: 9 September 1912
- Launched: 1913
- Fate: Struck a mine off France, 23 March 1917

General characteristics
- Class & type: Laforey-class destroyer
- Displacement: 965–1,300 long tons (980–1,321 t)
- Length: 269 ft (82 m)
- Beam: 26 ft 9 in (8.15 m)
- Draught: 9 ft 6 in (2.90 m)
- Installed power: 24,500 shp (18,300 kW)
- Propulsion: 2 × Parsons steam turbines; water-tube boilers; 2 × shafts
- Speed: 29 kn (33 mph; 54 km/h)
- Complement: 73
- Armament: 3 × QF 4-inch (102 mm) Mk IV guns; 1 × QF 2-pounder (40 mm) AA pom-pom Mk. II gun; 4 × 21-inch (533 mm) torpedo tubes (2x2)

HMS Laforey was the lead ship of her class of destroyer built for the Royal Navy. Launched a year before the First World War began, she was attached to the Dover Patrol. Laforey saw action in several engagements with German torpedo boats, including the Battle off Noordhinder Bank and the action of 17 March 1917. Laforey was sunk in 1917 by a British mine after escorting several freighters to France. She was named for Francis Laforey, captain of HMS Spartiate at the Battle of Trafalgar in 1805.

== Construction and design ==
On 29 March 1912, the British Admiralty placed orders for the first 16 destroyers of the L-class destroyer, (later to become the Laforey-class destroyer). Four of these ships were ordered from Fairfield Shipbuilding and Engineering Company, including the lead ship, to be named Florizel. Florizel was laid down at Fairfield's Govan, Glasgow shipyard on 9 September 1912 and launched on 22 August 1913. On 30 September 1913, the Admiralty ordered that the L-class be renamed with names beginning with the letter "L", and Florizel was renamed Laforey. Laforey was completed in February 1914.

Laforey was 268 feet 10 inches (81.94 m) long overall and 260 feet 0 inches (79.25 m) between perpendiculars, with a beam of 27 feet 6 inches (8.38 m) and a draught of 10 feet 10 inches (3.30 m). Displacement was 962 long tons (977 t) normal and 1,112 long tons (1,130 t) full load. Four Yarrow boilers fed steam at 250 pounds per square inch (1,700 kPa) to two sets of Brown-Curtis direct-drive steam turbine which, in turn, drove two propeller shafts, with a rated power of 24,500 shaft horsepower (18,300 kW), and a design speed of 29 knots (54 km/h; 33 mph) at full load, with a speed of 29.95 knots (55.47 km/h; 34.47 mph) reached during sea trials. Crew was 73 officers and men.

The ship's main gun armament consisted of three QF 4 in (102 mm) Mk IV guns on the ship's centreline, with 120 rounds per gun. The ship carried two twin 21 inch (533 mm) torpedo tubes, and was fitted with rails to carry four Vickers Elia Mk IV naval mines, although these rails were never used.

== Service ==
On commissioning, Laforey joined the 3rd Destroyer Flotilla as part of the First Fleet. On the outbreak of the First World War this Flotilla became part of the Harwich Force, under the overall command of Commodore Reginald Tyrwhitt. On 28 August 1914, Tyrwhitt led the Harwich Force, including the 3rd Destroyer Flotilla and Laforey, on a sortie into the southeastern part of the North Sea near the German Coast, known as the Heligoland Bight in an attempt to ambush German cruisers and destroyers. This developed into the Battle of Heligoland Bight where three German cruisers (Mainz, Cöln and Ariadne) and one destroyer (V187) was sunk at the cost of damage to the British cruiser HMS Arethusa and three destroyers (Laurel, Liberty and Laertes). Laforey was undamaged in the action.

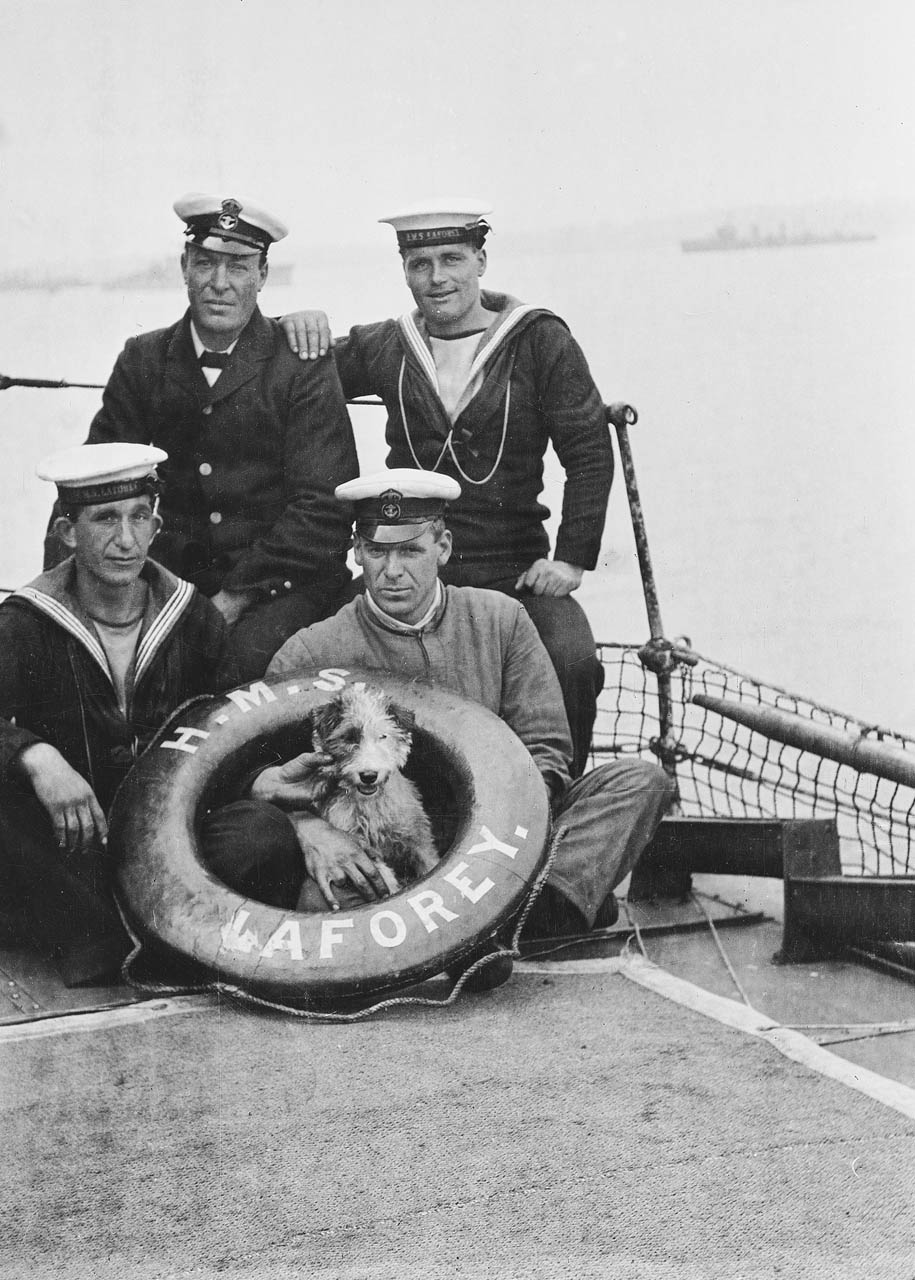
Crewmen with dog 1915–1916

On 23 January 1915, Laforey took part in another sortie of the Harwich Force, which together with the Battlecruiser Force under Admiral David Beatty, was to intercept a raid by German Battlecruisers which the Admiralty had been warned by decoded German radio signals. This resulted in the Battle of Dogger Bank, which took the form of a high speed chase of the German ships. The majority of the destroyers of the Harwich Force, including Laforey, were not fast enough to keep up with the battlecruisers. Only seven destroyers of the M class were fast enough to engage the German warships. On 1 May 1915, the old destroyer HMS Recruit was torpedoed and sunk by the German submarine UB-6 near the Goodwin Sands, and Laforey together with three sister ships (Lark, Lawford and Leonidas) were dispatched to search for the submarine, as were four naval trawlers. Two German torpedo boats, SMS A2 and A6 attacked the trawlers in the Action off Noordhinder Bank, sinking Columbia before the four British destroyers arrived. Although the torpedo boats attempted to escape, the destroyers sank both German ships.

In October 1915, Laforey joined the 5th Destroyer Flotilla, part of the Mediterranean Fleet, helping to cover the evacuation from ANZAC Cove at the end of the Gallipoli Campaign on 19–20 December, helping to destroy stores left behind after the troops pulled out. She remained as part of the 5th Flotilla until February 1916.

Laforey then rejoined the Harwich Force, as part of the 9th Destroyer Flotilla, and was part of the escort for the seaplane carrier HMS Vindex when Vindex launched an unsuccessful air attack against the German Zeppelin base at Tondern on 25–25 March 1916. The Harwich Force was held back as a reserve during the Battle of Jutland on 31 May–1 June 1916, but when the battleship Marlborough was damaged by a German torpedo, Laforey was one of eight destroyers of the Harwich Force sent to escort the crippled battleship to the Humber.

In October 1916, Laforey was one of a division of destroyers detached to reinforce the Dover Patrol, reaching Dover on 24 October. Fearing an attack by German surface vessels against shipping in The Downs, against the Belgian coast or against the Dover Barrage, where anti-submarine nets were guarded by lightly armed trawlers, Vice-Admiral Reginald Bacon, commander of the Dover Patrol, ordered four destroyers, including Laforey, to Dunkirk on 26 October. On that night the Germans launched an attack against the Dover Barrage and shipping in the Straits. One group of five German torpedo boats, the 18th Half Flotilla, was on the outward leg into the Straits of Dover when they sighted Laforey and companions sailing from Dover to Dunkirk. The British ships did not spot the German torpedo boats, which continued on their way unhindered. Later that night, other German torpedo boats attacked British drifters, and when the old destroyer Flirt went to investigate, sank Flirt. As a response, Bacon ordered six Tribal-class destroyers from Dover and Laforey's division of four destroyers from Dunkirk to sortie out in an attempt to intercept the German ships. In a confused action, the Tribal-class destroyer Nubian was torpedoed and badly damaged, while Amazon and Mohawk were damaged by German gunfire. While Laforey's division sighted the gunfire of the engagement, they were too far off to intervene, with the German ships escaping with little damage.

Early in 1917, the 9th Destroyer Flotilla was split up, with the newer destroyers joining the 10th Destroyer Flotilla, and the L-class ships being dispersed to different units. Laforey joined the 6th Destroyer Flotilla as part of the Dover Patrol on 5 March 1917. On the night of 17–18 March 1917, Laforey was on patrol in the Dover Straits when the Germans launched another raid by torpedo boats. The destroyer Paragon was torpedoed and sunk by the German warships. Laforey sighted an explosion and investigated, and on reaching a field of debris, started to search for survivors, signalling HMS Llewellyn to assist. Neither destroyer noticed that German torpedo boats were still in the vicinity, and two German ships, SMS G87 and S49 launched torpedoes against the British ships, one striking and damaging Llewellyn while the German torpedo boats escaped unseen, with the British at first believing the attack had been by a submarine.

On 23 March 1917, Laforey, together with sister ships Laertes, Lark and the destroyer Melpomene, were escorting several cargo ships to France, using the Folkestone to Dieppe route. The merchant ships arrived safely, but at around 16:30, after the destroyers had begun the return trip, a large explosion occurred amidships on Laforey. The ship immediately broke in half, and the stern sank rapidly. The bow remained afloat for a short time before sinking, during which Laertes struggled to rescue survivors. Laforey had been sunk by a British-laid mine. Only 18 of the 76 aboard survived. The wreck lies about 10 miles south off Shoreham-by-Sea at approximately 50° 38.600' N 000° 13.800' W, and is a recreational dive site.
