= Lydiard =

Lydiard may refer to:

== Places in England ==
- Lydiard Millicent, a Wiltshire village and parish, near the Borough of Swindon
- Lydiard Tregoze, a Wiltshire village and parish, near the Borough of Swindon
  - Lydiard Park, formerly in the parish, now in the Borough of Swindon
  - Lydiard House

== Surname ==
- Arthur Lydiard (1917–2004), New Zealand runner and athletics coach
- Charles Lydiard (d. 1807), Royal Navy officer
- Livingston A. Lydiard (1867–1954), American politician

== Christian name ==
- Lydiard H. Horton (1879––1945), psychologist and author

== Other uses ==
- HMS Lydiard (1914), a destroyer of the Royal Navy

== See also ==
- Liddiard, surname
