= HMS Lark (1913) =

Destroyer of the Royal Navy

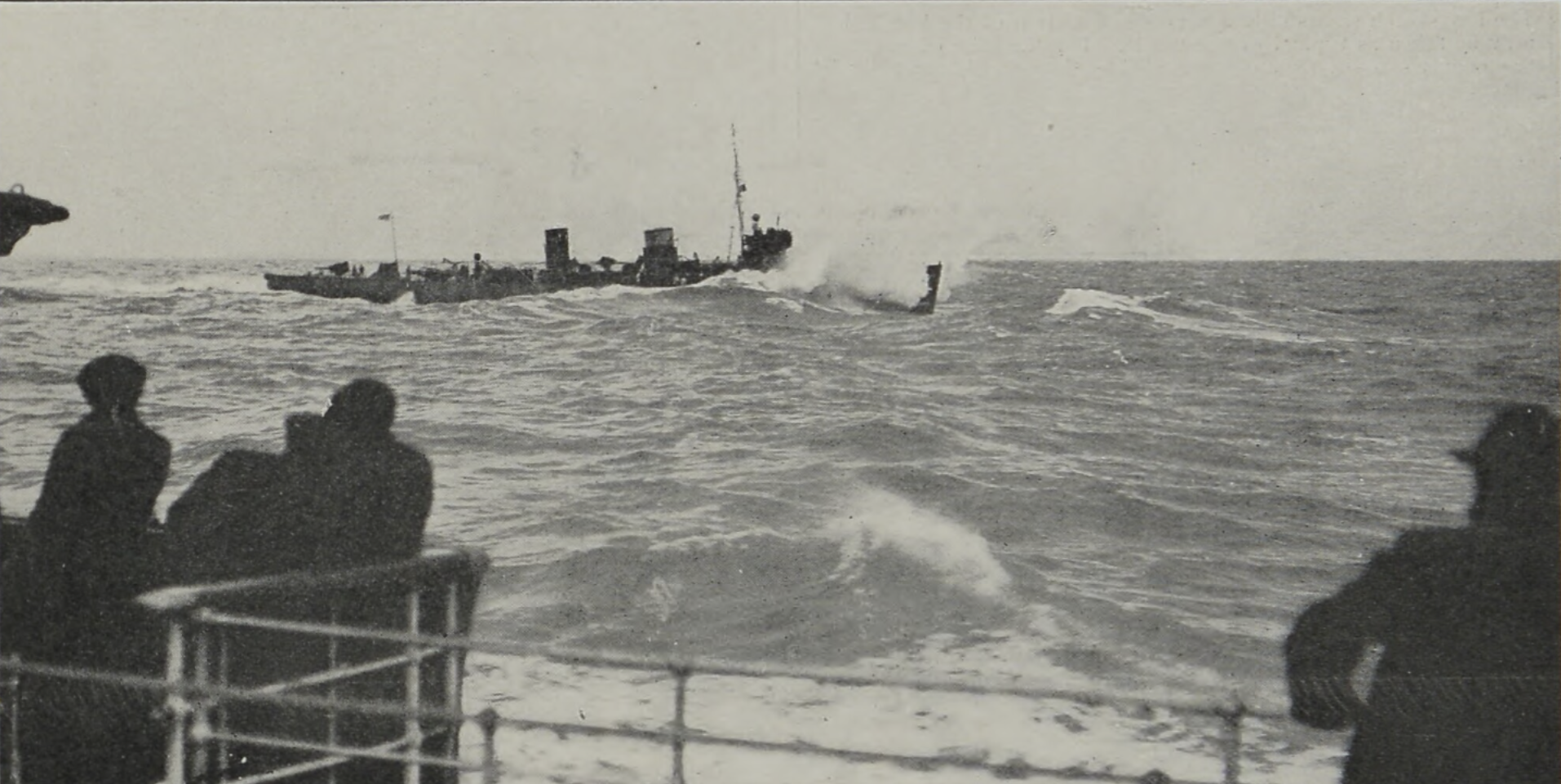
- British destroyer HMS Lark convoying a passenger steamer across the Channel (1914)

History

United Kingdom
- Name: HMS Lark
- Builder: Yarrow, Scotstoun
- Laid down: 28 June 1912
- Launched: 26 May 1913
- Completed: November 1913
- Fate: Sold 20 January 1923

General characteristics
- Class & type: Laforey-class destroyer
- Displacement: 968 long tons (984 t) deep load
- Length: 268 ft 10 in (81.94 m) oa
- Beam: 27 ft 6 in (8.38 m)
- Draught: 10 ft 10 in (3.30 m)
- Installed power: 24,500 shp (18,300 kW)
- Propulsion: 3 × Yarrow boilers; Brown-Curtis steam turbines; 2 shafts
- Speed: 29 kn (33 mph; 54 km/h)
- Complement: 73
- Armament: 3 × 4 in (102 mm) guns; 4 × 21 in (533 mm) torpedo tubes

HMS Lark was a Laforey-class destroyer of the British Royal Navy. The Laforey class (or L class) was the class of destroyers ordered under the Royal Navy's 1912–1913 construction programme, which were armed with three 4-inch (102 mm) guns and four torpedo tubes and were capable of 29 knots (33 mph; 54 km/h). The ship, which was originally to be named Haughty but was renamed before launch, was built by the Scottish shipbuilder Yarrow between 1912 and 1913.

Lark served during the First World War. She formed part of the Harwich Force in the early years of the war, taking part in the Battle of Heligoland Bight in 1914, the Battle of Dogger Bank in 1915.

== Construction and design ==
For the 1912–1913 shipbuilding programme for the Royal Navy, the British Admiralty ordered twenty destroyers to a design based on a modified version of the previous year's Acasta class, with the major difference being an increased torpedo armament of four torpedo tubes rather than two. Four of the destroyers were ordered from Yarrow, with four more from Fairfield, and two each from Denny, Parsons, Swan Hunter, Thornycroft, White and Beardmore.

The destroyers were 268 feet 10 inches (81.94 m) long overall and 260 feet 0 inches (79.25 m) between perpendiculars, with a beam of 27 feet 6 inches (8.38 m) and a draught of 10 feet 10 inches (3.30 m). Displacement of the class ranged from 968 to 1,010 long tons (984 to 1,026 t) at normal load and 1,150 to 1,300 long tons (1,170 to 1,320 t) at deep load, with Lark having a normal displacement of 968 long tons (984 t). Three Yarrow boilers fed two sets of Brown-Curtis impulse steam turbines. The machinery was rated at 24,500 shaft horsepower (18,270 kW), giving a speed of 29 knots (33 mph; 54 km/h). The ship had two funnels.

The ships were armed with three 4-inch (102 mm) QF Mk IV guns, with a single .303-inch (7.70 mm) Maxim machine gun. Two twin 21-inch (533 mm) torpedo tubes were fitted. The ships were built with fittings to carry four mines, but these were never used. The ship's crew was 73 officers and ratings. Wartime modifications included the addition of a 2-pounder (40 mm) pom-pom anti-aircraft autocannon, the provision of depth charges, which may have resulted in one of the ship's guns and a pair of torpedo tubes being removed in 1918 to accommodate an outfit of 30–50 depth charges, while the ship was also modified to allow a kite balloon to be operated.

The first of the four Yarrow-built destroyers, Haughty was laid down at Yarrow's Scotstoun yard on 28 June 1912. On 30 September 1913, the 1912–1913 destroyers, which were previously to be known as the Rob Roy class, were redesignated the L or Laforey class, with the ships given new names string with the letter L. Haughty was renamed Lark. Lark was launched on 26 May 1913 and completed in November that year.

== Service ==
=== 1914 ===
Lark, like the rest of the Laforey class, joined the Harwich Force at the outbreak of the First World War. On 5 August 1914, the Third Destroyer Flotilla, led by the light cruiser Amphion and including Lark, carried out a sweep to prevent German minelayers or torpedo craft entering the English Channel. Later that morning, the flotilla leader Landrail and sister ship Lance were ordered ahead of the flotilla to investigate, and came across the German minelayer Königin Luise, laying mines off Southwold on the Suffolk coast. The German ship attempted to escape to neutral waters, but was engaged and sunk by Lance, Landrail and Amphion. The flotilla was returning from the sweep in 6 August when it ran into the minefield laid by Königin Luise. Amphion struck a mine and began to sink, her crew abandoning ship, but drifted onto another mine, with debris from the resulting explosion hitting Lark killing two of Amphion's crew that had just been rescued as well as a prisoner from Königin Luise. In total, 151 of Amphion's crew were killed. On 28 August 1914, the Harwich Force, supported by light cruisers and battlecruisers of the Grand Fleet, carried out a raid towards Heligoland with the intention of destroying patrolling German torpedo boats. Lark formed part of the 2nd Division of the Third Flotilla during this operation. Lark took part in torpedo attacks against the German light cruisers Frauenlob, Strassburg and Mainz, expending all her torpedoes and 4-inch ammunition, requiring her to borrow 100 rounds of 4-inch ammunition from Leonidas.

On 24 October 1914, Lark set out from Harwich as part of the escort for the seaplane carriers Engadine and Empress on a raid against the German airship base at Cuxhaven. The force reached the launch-off point off Heligoland on the morning of 25 October, but poor weather meant that only two of the six seaplanes managed to take-off, both of which quickly abandoned the mission.

On 2 November 1914, the light cruiser Aurora, together with Lark and the destroyers Lawford and Laverock, left Harwich to patrol on the Broad Fourteens in search of German submarines. The course of the force took it between British and German minefields, and the force encountered many floating mines which had broken adrift from the two minefields. Lark destroyed six mines, with 15 mines being destroyed by the force during the day. At the same time, German battlecruisers were carrying out a raid on the east coast of England, and on the morning of 3 November, carried out a brief bombardment of Yarmouth. Both Lark's force, and another small force of destroyers, led by the light cruiser Undaunted, were ordered to make for Terschelling off the Dutch coast, with the hope of cutting off the Germans from their bases, while the main force of the Harwich Force would leave Harwich as soon as it had raised steam. The German force avoided interception, and returned to Germany.

On 15 December 1914, the Germans staged a raid with their battlecruisers against the British East Coast towns of Scarborough, Whitby and Hartlepool. Warned by the codebreakers of Room 40, the British ordered a force of battlecruisers and battleships, together with the light cruisers of the Harwich Force, to intercept the Germans. Lark fouled a buoy when leaving Harwich harbour, so did not sail with the Harwich Force. The British forces again failed to intercept the German raiders.

=== 1915–1916 ===
On 23 January 1915, the German battlecruisers under Admiral Franz von Hipper made a sortie to attack British fishing boats on the Dogger Bank. British Naval Intelligence was warned of the raid by radio messages decoded by Room 40, and sent out the Battlecruiser Force from Rosyth, commanded by Admiral Beatty aboard Lion and the Harwich Force, commanded by Commodore Reginald Tyrwhitt aboard the light cruiser Arethusa were sent out to intercept the German force. Lark was part of the 4th Division of the Third Flotilla when it sailed as part of the Harwich Force. The majority of the destroyers of the Harwich Force, including Lark, were not fast enough to keep up with the battlecruisers. Only seven destroyers of the M class were fast enough to engage the German warships.

On 1 May 1915, the German submarine SM UB-6 torpedoed and sank the old British destroyer Recruit near the Galloper Light Vessel, off the Thames Estuary. Four destroyers of the Harwich Force, Lark, Laforey, Lawford and Leonidas set out to hunt for Recruit's assailant. Meanwhile, two German torpedo boats, A-2 and A-6, which had been searching for a German floatplane which had ditched, encountered four British trawlers near the North Hinder. One of the trawlers, Columbia was sunk by a German torpedo, but the remaining three trawlers survived, with the two German torpedo boats breaking off the attack when the four British destroyers of the Lark group approached. The torpedo boats, which were small coastal boats of the A class which were outclassed by the British ships, attempted to flee to neutral waters, but were soon caught and sunk by gunfire. In June 1915, most of the Harwich Force, including Lark was employed in anti-submarine operations at the west end of the English Channel, covering the arrival of troops from Canada and the despatch of troops to the Dardanelles campaign.

In the summer of 1915, the 3rd Flotilla was renamed the Ninth Destroyer Flotilla. On 20 February 1916, part of the Ninth Flotilla, including Lark set out from Harwich to cover minesweeping operations. Lark collided with sister ship Llewellyn shortly after leaving Harwich, and the two destroyers, accompanied by Loyal, had to return to Harwich. On 3 May 1916, Lark escorted the minelayer Princess Margaret on Operation XX, a combined minelaying operation by Princess Margaret and the destroyer minelayer Abdiel and air raid by seaplanes from Engadine and Vindex against the German airship base at Tondern. (Note: Lark and sister ship Lucifer were the only destroyers of the Harwich force to take part in this operation. The Grand Fleet provided the bulk of the forces participating.) The minefields were successfully laid without German interference, although the light cruisers Galatea and Phaeton, supporting the operation, shot down the German airship L 7.

On 1 June 1916, the Harwich Force sortied to reinforce the Grand Fleet following the Battle of Jutland. Lark was one of eight destroyers detached to screen the damaged battleship Marlborough, which had been torpedoed during the battle, helping to escort the battleship to the Humber for temporary repair. On 5 September 1916, Lark and Laurel were deployed to the English Channel to escort Princess Victoria, carrying a load of Gold bullion from Cherbourg to Portsmouth.

The destroyers of the Harwich Force were regularly detached to the Channel to strengthen the defences of the Dover Patrol against potential attack by German surface forces, and in late October 1916, Lark was part of a division of four destroyers led by Lawford (Note: Lawford, Lark, Lance and Lochinvar) that was taking its turn reinforcing the Dover Patrol. On the night of 26/27 October 1916, Lawford's division was patrolling off The Downs, while four more L-class destroyers were on passage to Dunkirk, and six more destroyers waiting at Dover. On that night the Germans launched an attack against the Dover Barrage and shipping in the Straits. Later that night, one group of German torpedo boats attacked British drifters, and when the old destroyer Flirt went to investigate, sank Flirt. As a response, Bacon ordered six Tribal-class destroyers from Dover and Laforey's division of four destroyers from Dunkirk to sortie out in an attempt to intercept the German ships. In a confused action, the Tribal-class destroyer Nubian was torpedoed and badly damaged, having her bow blown off, while Amazon and Mohawk were damaged by German gunfire, with the German ships escaping with little damage. Lawford's division, which had sortied from Dover on hearing reports of German activity in the straits, encountered Nubian which was disabled and firing distress flares, and Lark took Nubian under a stern-first tow. Bad weather caused the tow line to break, however, and Nubian ran aground under the South Foreland.

=== 1917–1918 ===
Early in 1917, the 9th Destroyer Flotilla was split up, with the newer destroyers joining the 10th Destroyer Flotilla, and the L-class ships being dispersed to different units. Lark joined the 6th Destroyer Flotilla as part of the Dover Patrol on 1 March 1917. On the night of 17/18 March 1917, German torpedo boats launched another attack on the Dover Barrage and shipping in the Channel. German torpedo boats torpedoed and sunk the destroyer Paragon and the merchant ship SS Greypoint and badly damaging the destroyer Llewellyn. Lark and the destroyer Myngs were ordered to reinforce the ships patrolling the barrage after the attack, but the Germans had already left. On 23 March 1917, Lark, together with sister ships Laertes, Laforey and the destroyer Melpomene, escorted several cargo ships to France, using the Folkestone to Dieppe route. The merchant ships arrived safely, but at around 16:30, after the destroyers had begun the return trip, Laforey struck a mine, breaking in half and sinking. Lark and Laertes rescued 18 or Laforey's crew, with 58 killed. Lark left the Dover Patrol on 10 April 1917, joining the 1st Destroyer Flotilla based at Portsmouth. On 27 May 1917, Lark sighted a submarine mid-Channel, and dropped a total of four depth charges, although no damage was observed.

Lark remained part of the 1st Flotilla in January 1918, but by February had moved to the Firth of Forth, forming part of what became the Methil Convoy Flotilla. Lark remained part of the Methill Flotilla until the end of the war, although she was noted as being paid off in December 1918.

=== Disposal ===
By June 1919, Lark was listed as being laid up in reserve at The Nore, and on 28 November 1919, her crew was reduced to a Care and Maintenance Party. Lark was sold for scrap on 20 January 1923.

== Pennant numbers ==
Pennant number	Dates
H34	1914–January 1918
H49	January 1918–
