= Liddiard =

Liddiard or Lidiard is a surname. Notable people with the surname include:

- Alan Lidiard (1928–2020), British physicist
- Dennis Liddiard, American make-up artist
- Gareth Liddiard (born 1975), Australian musician
- Rebecca Liddiard (born 1990 or 1991), Canadian actress
- Victoria Lidiard (1889–1992), British suffragette

== See also ==
- Lydiard (disambiguation)
