= HMS Leonidas (1913) =

Destroyer of the Royal Navy

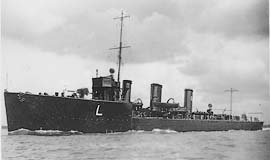

History

United Kingdom
- Name: HMS Leonidas
- Ordered: 1912
- Builder: Parsons Marine Steam Turbine Company, hull sub-contracted to WallsendHawthorn Leslie, Hebburn
- Launched: 30 October 1913
- Fate: Sold for scrapping 1921

General characteristics
- Class & type: Laforey-class destroyer
- Displacement: 965–1,003 long tons (980–1,019 t)
- Length: 269 ft (82 m)
- Beam: 26 ft 9 in (8.15 m)
- Draught: 9 ft 6 in (2.90 m)
- Installed power: 22,500 shp (16.8 MW)
- Propulsion: Water-tube boilers; Parsons geared steam turbines; 2 shafts
- Speed: 29 knots (54 km/h; 33 mph)
- Complement: 77
- Armament: 3 × QF 4-inch (100 mm) Mk IV guns, mounting P Mk. IX; 2 × twin 21 inch (533 mm) torpedo tubes

HMS Leonidas was a Laforey-class destroyer of the Royal Navy. She was launched on 30 October 1913. She served in World War I with the 3rd Destroyer Flotilla and as a convoy escort and was broken up in 1922. The ship was originally named Rob Roy but the name was changed after a new naming scheme was introduced to give all ships of the same class names beginning with the same letter. Overall cost of the ship was £100,000

== Technical innovations ==
Leonidas, together with Lucifer, was one of two experimental destroyers ordered in 1912 from Parsons to be fitted with fully geared turbines. Gearing meant that the turbine itself could run at higher speeds than the propeller, which improved efficiency. Two previous experimental destroyers, Badger and Beaver had been ordered in 1911 which used gearing for the high pressure (HP) turbines but not for the low pressure (LP) ones. Sufficiently robust gearboxes were at that time experimental and were only just being produced by Parsons who had developed innovative gear cutting equipment. Ships propellers rotated at a maximum speed of 380 rpm, while the LP turbines ran at 1800 rpm and the HP at 3000 rpm. It was anticipated that the additional gearing would produce an overall 10% increase in efficiency, ranging from 9% at full power to 26% at low power, since turbines are more efficient at higher speeds and performance particularly suffered when the engines were running slowly. Comparative tests indicated the savings equated to the ships being able to remain on patrol at cruising speeds for an extra two days as compared to a ship using partially geared turbines. Cost of the ships increased because of providing gearboxes, but this was partly offset against a reduction in the total necessary power from the turbine to achieve a given speed, meaning that smaller and cheaper turbines could be used. Other ships of the class built without LP gearing required 24,500 shp compared to 22,500 shp for this design.

Two designs were produced for the ships propellers because of disagreement between the admiralty and Parsons on the better design. For the same overall dimensions, Parsons used a blade area of 54 square feet (5.0 m^{2}) while the admiralty preferred 42.5 sq ft (3.95 m^{2}). The introduction of gearing meant that bearings holding the shafts were now subject to large lateral forces where the gears pushed against each other. This was a significant difficulty in gearbox design but was overcome by the introduction of the new Michell tilting-pad fluid bearing. This was first employed in 1913 on a cross-channel steamer, Paris built by Denny of Dunbarton which also used geared turbines, and then on Leonidas and Lucifer. Traditional bearings were found unable to support the forces in turbine gearboxes but also had higher friction in more traditional application with reciprocating engines. It was estimated that the reduced frictional losses on new bearings introduced throughout the fleet saved the admiralty £500,000 in reduced fuel consumption in 1918.

== Career ==
Leonidas took part in a battle off Noorhinder Bank on 1 May 1915 when together with three other destroyers, Laforey, Lawford and Lark, she was dispatched to go to the aid of four British armed trawlers which had engaged two German torpedo boats, A2 and A6. One of the trawlers had been sunk, but sufficient damage had been caused to A6 that the Germans chose to withdraw. The four destroyers pursued the torpedo boats, eventually catching and sinking them. Leonidas also served in the 3rd Destroyer Flotilla at the first battle of Heligoland Bight.

== Bibliography ==
- Brown, David (1997). The Grand Fleet. Barnsley: Seaforth publishing. ISBN 978-1-84832-085-7.
- Colledge, J. J.; Warlow, Ben (2006) [1969]. Ships of the Royal Navy: The Complete Record of All Fighting Ships of the Royal Navy from the 15th Century to the Present (3rd Rev ed.). London: Chatham Publishing. ISBN 978-1-86176-281-8. OCLC 67375475.
- Dittmar, F.J. & Colledge, J.J. (1972). British Warships 1914–1919. Shepperton, UK: Ian Allan. ISBN 0-7110-0380-7.
- Friedman, Norman (2009). British Destroyers: From Earliest Days to the Second World War. Barnsley, UK: Seaforth Publishing. ISBN 978-1-84832-049-9.
- Gardiner, Robert & Gray, Randal (1985). Conway's All The World's Fighting Ships 1906–1921. London: Conway Maritime Press. ISBN 0-85177-245-5.
