= Samuel Dana Horton =

Samuel Dana Horton (January 16, 1844 – February 23, 1895), American writer on bimetallism, was born in Pomeroy, Ohio.

He graduated at Harvard in 1864, and at the Harvard Law School in 1868, studied Roman law in Berlin in 1869, and in 1871 was admitted to the Ohio bar. He practised law in Cincinnati, and then in Pomeroy until 1885, when he gave up law for the advancement of bimetallism.

His attention had been turned to monetary questions by the greenback campaign of 1873 in Ohio, in which, as in former campaigns, he had spoken, particularly effectively in German, for the Republican party. He was secretary of the American delegation to the Monetary Conference which met in Paris in 1878, and edited the report of the delegation.

To the conference of 1881 he was a delegate, and thereafter he spent much of his time in Europe, whither he was sent by President Harrison in 1889 as special commissioner to promote the international restoration of silver. He died in Washington, DC.

Horton's principal works were The Silver Pound (1887) and Silver in Europe (1890), a volume of essays.

In 1877 he married Blanche Harriott Lydiard (1850–1898). They had one son Lydiard Horton (1879–1945).
