= Noordhinder Bank =

Shoal in the North Sea

Noordhinder Bank is a shoal in the southern part of the North Sea, between Antwerp, Belgium, and the mouth of the Thames in south-east England.

There is, or was, a lightship there. It is located about 74 kilometres (46 mi) from Flushing and 54 kilometres (34 mi) from Ostend.

During World War I, there was a naval skirmish referred to as the Battle off Noordhinder Bank between the German and British naval forces nearby.

== Coordinate location ==
Noordhinder Bank is at 51°39′N 02°41′E
