= Lydiard H. Horton =

American psychologist (1879–1945)

Lydiard Heneage Horton (1879 – January 19, 1945) was an American consulting psychologist and author, who lectured and wrote about dream psychology, as well as World War I shell shock and trench nightmare.

== Biography ==
Horton was born in London, the only child of Samuel Dana Horton (died 1895), a lawyer and writer on bimetalism, and an English mother, Blanche Harriot Lydiard (died 1898), who was born in India. Horton's childhood was spent in England, the United States, and Switzerland.

He died on January 19, 1945.

== Legacy ==
His papers are collected at Columbia University.

== Book ==
- The Dream Problem and Mechanism of Thought, 1925
