= HMS Recruit (1896) =

Royal Navy 30-knot destroyer

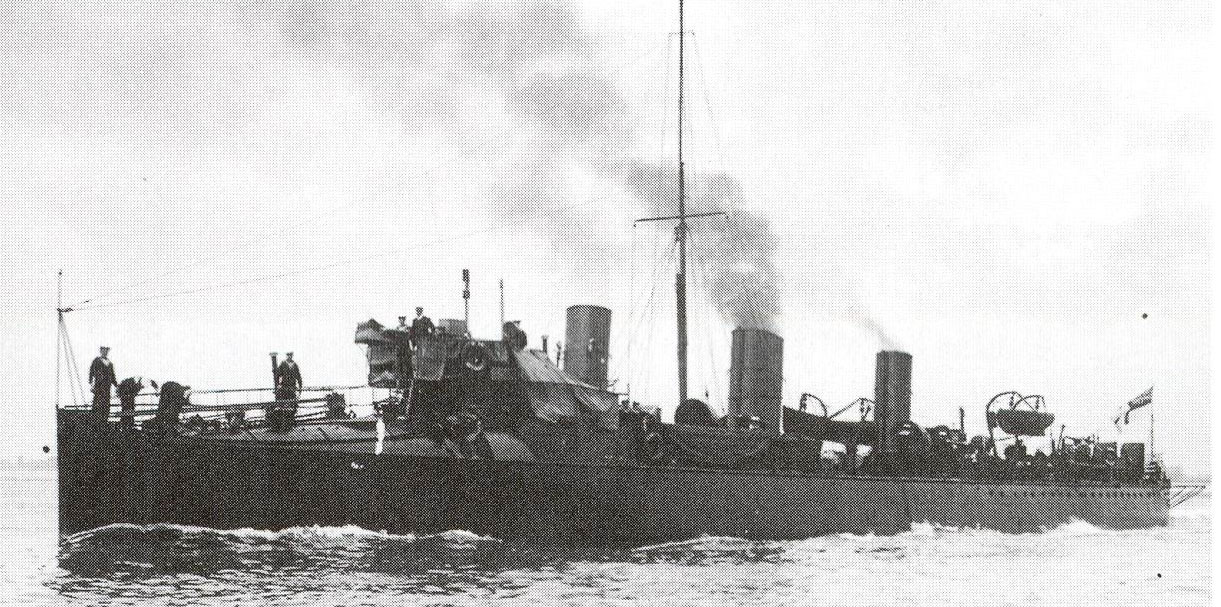
- HMS Recruit

History

United Kingdom
- Name: HMS Recruit
- Ordered: 1895 – 1896 Naval Estimates
- Builder: J & G Thomson, Clydebank
- Laid down: 18 October 1895
- Launched: 22 August 1896
- Commissioned: October 1900
- Fate: Sunk, 1 May 1915

General characteristics
- Class & type: Clydebank three funnel - 30 knot destroyer
- Displacement: 380 long tons (386 t) light; 425 long tons (432 t) full load
- Length: 218 ft (66 m) o/a
- Beam: 20 ft (6.1 m)
- Draught: 8 ft 6 in (2.59 m)
- Propulsion: 4 × Normand water tube boiler; 2 × Vertical Triple Expansion (VTE) steam engines driving 2 shafts producing 5,800 shp (4,300 kW)
- Speed: 30 kn (56 km/h; 35 mph)
- Range: 80 tons coal; 1,465 nmi (2,713 km) at 11 kn (20 km/h)
- Complement: 63 officers and men
- Armament: 1 × QF 12-pounder 12 cwt Mark I L/40 naval gun; 5 × QF 6 pdr 8 cwt naval gun L/40 naval gun; 2 × single tubes for 18-inch (450 mm) torpedoes

HMS Recruit was a Clydebank three-funnel, 30-knot destroyer ordered by the Royal Navy under the 1895–1896 Naval Estimates. She was the fifth ship to carry this name since it was introduced in 1806 for an 18-gun brig-sloop, sold in 1822.

== Construction ==
The British Admiralty's 1895–1896 shipbuilding programme included orders for 20 "thirty-knotter" torpedo-boat destroyers, with four destroyers ordered from the Clydebank shipbuilder J & G Thomson.

Thomson's design was an enlarged version of their successful "twenty seven-knotter" design with more powerful engines to reach the higher contract speed. The design had an overall length of 214 feet 0 inches (65.23 m) and a length between perpendiculars of 210 ft 0 in (64.01 m), with a beam of 20 ft 0 in (6.10 m) and a draught of 8 ft 6 in (2.59 m). Design displacement was 345 long tons (351 t) light and 385 long tons (391 t) full load. Four Normand boilers fed steam at 230 pounds per square inch (1,600 kPa) to triple expansion steam engines rated at 5,800 indicated horsepower (4,300 kW) and driving two propeller shafts. Three funnels were fitted. 80 tons of coal were carried, giving a range of 1,465 nautical miles (2,713 km; 1,686 mi) at 11 knots (20 km/h; 13 mph). The ship had a complement of 63 officers and men.

Armament was specified as a single QF 12-pounder 12 cwt (3 in (76 mm) calibre) gun on a platform on the ship's conning tower (in practice the platform was also used as the ship's bridge), backed up by five 6-pounder guns, and two 18-inch (450 mm) torpedo tubes.

Recruit was laid down as yard number 290, on 18 October 1895, and launched on 22 August 1896. Like the other Thomson destroyers built under the 1895–1896 programme, she had problems making her contract speed of 30 knots, and was therefore lengthened by 4 feet (1.2 m), giving an overall length of 218 ft (66.45 m) and a length between perpendiculars of 214 ft (65.23 m). Displacement increased to 380 long tons (390 t) light and 425 long tons (432 t) full load. She was completed and accepted by the Royal Navy in October 1900, the last of this group to be completed.

== Early service ==
Recruit was deployed in Home waters for her entire service life. After commissioning she was assigned to the Chatham Division of the Harwich Flotilla. Lieutenant and Commander Cecil Rooke was in command when on 27 May 1902, Recruit ran aground in thick fog off Cornwall. She was refloated with the help of tugs, and towed to Penzance, where she had temporary repairs. The damage was extensive, including a large hole under the forward boiler leading the engine room to be filled with water, and she was taken to Devonport for further repairs. A court-martial held the following month severely reprimanded Lieutenant Rooke for having "negligently, or by default, hazarded" the vessel. After finishing repairs in December 1902, she went to Portsmouth where her crew turned over to HMS Hasty to navigate her to Devonport.

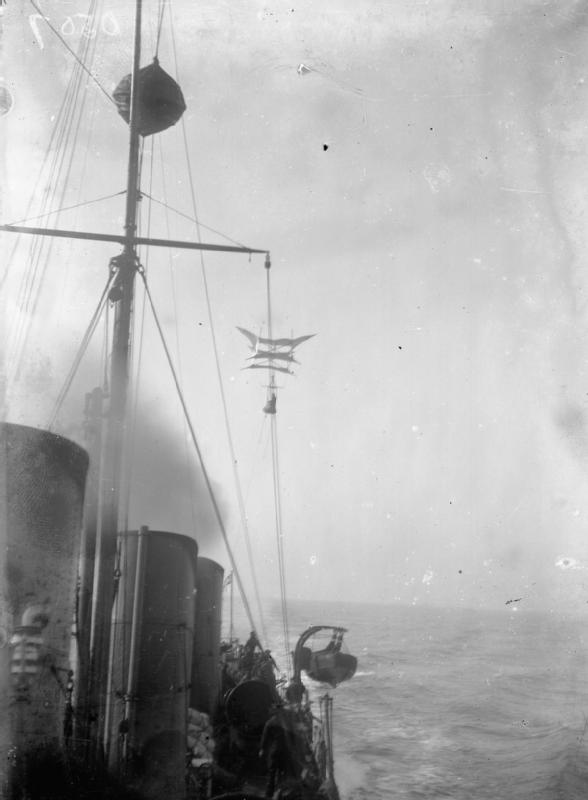
A Cody man-lifting kite being towed by Recruit

Recruit was based at Isle of Portland in 1905, and at Portsmouth as a tender to the depot ship HMS Hecla between 1906 and 1907. Recruit, attached to the gunnery school HMS Excellent, was used for trials of the use of man-lifting kites designed by Samuel Cody for observation purposes (particularly associated with attempts to spot mines from the air) in August–October 1908. In 1910, Recruit was based at Devonport as part of the 5th Destroyer Flotilla, and in 1912, when older destroyers were allocated to Patrol Flotillas, Recruit was assigned to the 6th Flotilla, based at Portsmouth.

On 30 August 1912 the Admiralty directed all destroyer classes were to be designated by alphabetical characters starting with the letter 'A'. Since her design speed was 30 knots and she had three funnels she was assigned to the C class on 30 September 1913. The class letters were painted on the hull below the bridge area and on a funnel.

In February 1913, Recruit was based at Sheerness, attached to HMS Actaeon, the torpedo training school. Recruit remained at Sheerness as a tender to Actaeon in July 1914, on the eve of the outbreak of the First World War.

== First World War ==
With the outbreak of hostilities Recruit was assigned to the Nore Local Defence Flotilla. Her duties included anti-submarine and counter mining patrols in the Thames Estuary. On 1 May 1915 Recruit was patrolling with sister ship Brazen in the southern North Sea, 30 nmi (56 km; 35 mi) south-west of the Galloper Lightvessel off the Thames Estuary, when she was struck by a torpedo fired by the German submarine UB-6. Recruit broke in two and sank quickly with the loss of 39 men, 4 officers and 22 crewmen were rescued. The Royal Navy search for this submarine resulted in the Battle off Noordhinder Bank, in which two German torpedo boats were sunk.

== Pennant numbers ==
Pennant Number	From	To
N60	6 Dec 1914	1 May 1915
