= SM UB-6 =

WWI German Imperial Navy submarine

Coordinates: 51°53′N 3°58′E

- UB-6 was similar in appearance to her sister boat SM UB-4, pictured here in 1915.

History

German Empire
- Name: UB-6
- Ordered: 15 November 1914
- Builder: Germaniawerft, Kiel
- Yard number: 244
- Laid down: 22 November 1914
- Launched: March 1915
- Commissioned: 8 April 1915
- Fate: Scuttled at Hellevoetsluis, 18 March 1917; broken up at Brest, July 1921

General characteristics
- Class & type: Type UB I submarine
- Displacement: 127 t (125 long tons) surfaced; 142 t (140 long tons) submerged
- Length: 28.10 m (92 ft 2 in) (o/a)
- Beam: 3.15 m (10 ft 4 in)
- Draught: 3.03 m (9 ft 11 in)
- Propulsion: 1 × propeller shaft; 1 × Daimler 4-cylinder diesel engine, 59 bhp (44 kW); 1 × Siemens-Schuckert electric motor, 119 shp (89 kW)
- Speed: 6.47 knots (11.98 km/h; 7.45 mph) surfaced; 5.51 knots (10.20 km/h; 6.34 mph) submerged
- Range: 1,650 nmi (3,060 km; 1,900 mi) at 5 knots (9.3 km/h; 5.8 mph) surfaced; 45 nmi (83 km; 52 mi) at 4 knots (7.4 km/h; 4.6 mph)
- Test depth: 50 metres (160 ft)
- Complement: 14
- Armament: 2 × 45 cm (17.7 in) bow torpedo tubes; 2 × torpedoes; 1 × 8 mm (0.31 in) deck gun
- Notes: 33-second diving time

Service record
- Part of: Flanders Flotilla; 19 April 1915 – 12 March 1917
- Commanders: Oblt. Erich Haecker; 8 April – 12 November 1915; Oblt. Ernst Voigt; 13 November 1915 – 26 April 1916; Oblt. Karl Neumann; 27 April – 21 July 1916; Oblt. Karsten von Heydebreck; 22 July 1916 – 9 January 1917; Oblt. Oskar Steckelberg; 10 January – 12 March 1917
- Operations: 60 patrols
- Victories: 15 merchant ships sunk (5,966 GRT); 1 warship sunk (335 tons); 2 merchant ships damaged (1,098 GRT); 1 merchant ship taken as prize (1,328 GRT)

SM UB-6 was a German Type UB I submarine or U-boat in the German Imperial Navy (German: Kaiserliche Marine) during World War I. The submarine was interned after running aground in neutral Dutch waters, and was scuttled by her crew at Hellevoetsluis.

UB-6 was ordered in October 1914 and was laid down at the Germaniawerft shipyard in Kiel in November. UB-6 was a little more than 28 metres (92 ft) in length and displaced between 127 and 142 tonnes (125 and 140 long tons), depending on whether surfaced or submerged. She carried two torpedoes for her two bow torpedo tubes and was also armed with a deck-mounted machine gun. UB-6 was broken into sections and shipped by rail to Antwerp for reassembly. She was launched in March 1915 and commissioned as SM UB-6 in April. (Note: "SM" stands for "Seiner Majestät" (English: His Majesty's) and combined with the U for Unterseeboot would be translated as His Majesty's Submarine.)

UB-6 spent her entire career in the Flanders Flotilla and sank HMS Recruit, the first warship credited to the flotilla in May 1915. Through September 1916, the U-boat accounted for fifteen additional ships sunk, two ships damaged, and one ship seized as a prize. On 12 March 1917, UB-6 ran aground near the Meuse (Maas) in the Netherlands due to a navigational error by her commander; the submarine and crew were interned by the neutral country and taken to Hellevoetsluis. Six days later, UB-6 was scuttled by her crew, which remained interned for the rest of the war. The wreck of UB-6 was ceded to France in 1919 and broken up at Brest in July 1921.

== Design and construction ==
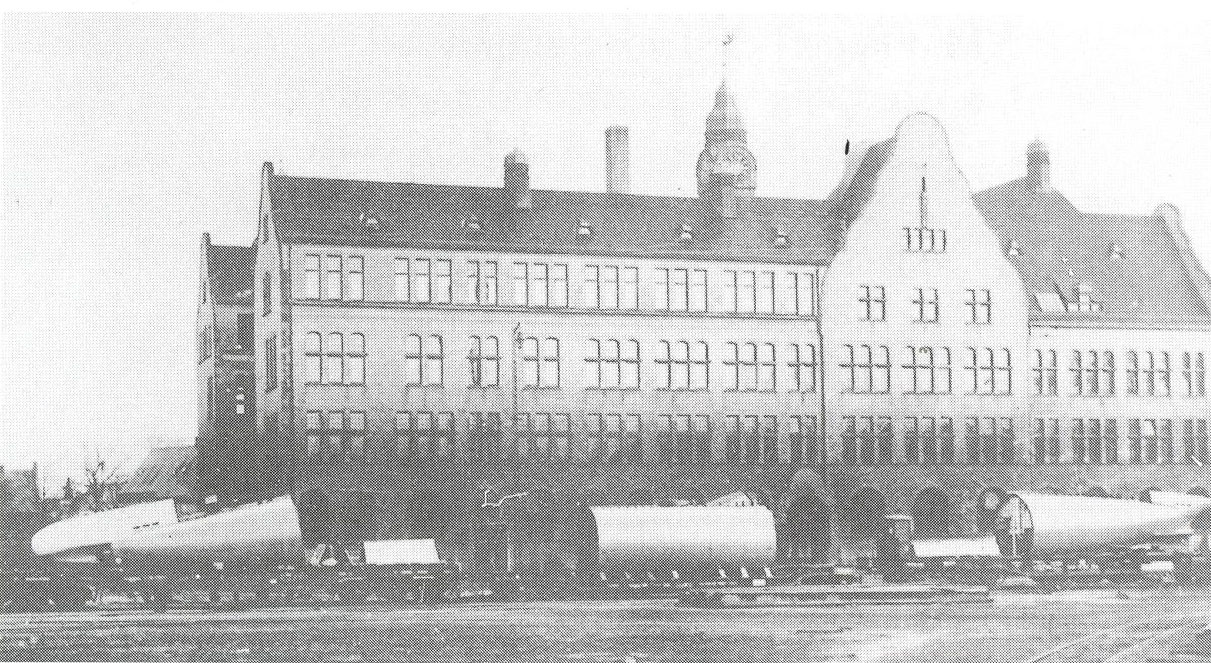
Railtransport of UB-I class U-Boat

After the German Army's rapid advance along the North Sea coast in the earliest stages of World War I, the German Imperial Navy found itself without suitable submarines that could be operated in the narrow and shallow seas off Flanders. Project 34, a design effort begun in mid-August 1914, produced the Type UB I design: a small submarine that could be shipped by rail to a port of operations and quickly assembled. Constrained by railroad size limitations, the UB I design called for a boat about 28 metres (92 ft) long and displacing about 125 tonnes (123 long tons) with two torpedo tubes. (Note: A further refinement of the design—replacing the torpedo tubes with mine chutes but changing little else—evolved into the Type UC I coastal minelaying submarine. See: Miller, p. 458.) UB-6 was part of the initial allotment of eight submarines—numbered UB-1 to UB-8—ordered on 15 October from Germaniawerft of Kiel, just shy of two months after planning for the class began.

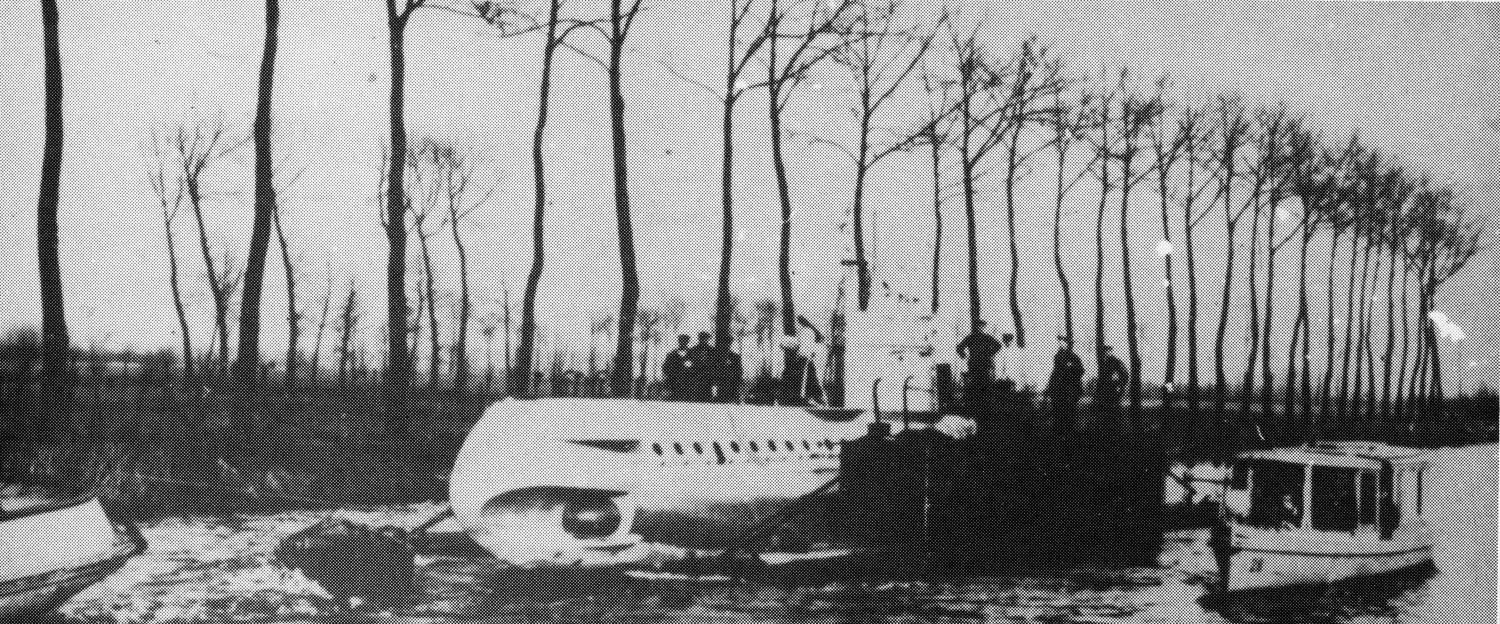
River transport of UB-6 in Belgium

UB-6 was laid down by Germaniawerft in Kiel on 22 November. As built, UB-6 was 28.10 metres (92 ft 2 in) long, 3.15 metres (10 ft 4 in) abeam, and had a draft of 3.03 metres (9 ft 11 in). She had a single 59-brake-horsepower (44 kW) Daimler 4-cylinder diesel engine for surface travel, and a single 119-shaft-horsepower (89 kW) Siemens-Schuckert electric motor for underwater travel, both attached to a single propeller shaft. Her top speeds were 6.47 knots (11.98 km/h; 7.45 mph), surfaced, and 5.51 knots (10.20 km/h; 6.34 mph), submerged. At more moderate speeds, she could sail up to 1,650 nautical miles (3,060 km; 1,900 mi) on the surface before refueling, and up to 45 nautical miles (83 km; 52 mi) submerged before recharging her batteries. Like all boats of the class, UB-6 was rated to a diving depth of 50 metres (160 ft), and could completely submerge in 33 seconds.

UB-6 was armed with two 45-centimeter (17.7 in) torpedoes in two bow torpedo tubes. She was also outfitted for a single 8mm MG 08 Deck gun. UB-6's standard complement consisted of one officer and thirteen enlisted men.

After work on UB-6 was complete at the Germaniwerft yard, UB-6 was readied for rail shipment. The process of shipping a UB I boat involved breaking the submarine down into what was essentially a knock down kit. Each boat was broken into approximately fifteen pieces and loaded onto eight railway flatcars. In early 1915, the sections of UB-6 were shipped to Antwerp for assembly in what was typically a two- to three-week process. After UB-6 was assembled and launched sometime in March, she was loaded on a barge and taken through canals to Bruges where she underwent trials.

== Early career ==
The submarine was commissioned into the German Imperial Navy as SM UB-6 on 8 April under the command of Kapitänleutnant (Kptlt.) Erich Haecker, a 29-year-old first-time U-boat commander. (Note: Haecker was in the Navy's April 1906 cadet class with 34 other future U-boat captains, including Wilhelm Marschall, Matthias Graf von Schmettow, Max Viebeg, and Erwin Waßner. See: Helgason, Guðmundur. "WWI Officer Crews: Crew 4/06". German and Austrian U-boats of World War I - Kaiserliche Marine - Uboat.net.) On 19 April, UB-6 joined the other UB I boats then comprising the Flanders Flotilla (German: U-boote des Marinekorps U-Flotille Flandern), which had been organized on 29 March. When UB-6 joined the flotilla, Germany was in the midst of its first submarine offensive, begun in February. During this campaign, enemy vessels in the German-defined war zone (German: Kriegsgebiet), which encompassed all waters around the United Kingdom were to be sunk. Vessels of neutral countries were not to be attacked unless they definitively could be identified as enemy vessels operating under a false flag.

The UB I boats of the Flanders Flotilla were initially limited to patrols in the Hoofden, the southern portion of the North Sea between the United Kingdom and the Netherlands. Although UB-4 had made both the first sortie and sunk the first ship of the flotilla in April, UB-6 sank the first warship credited to the flotilla. On 1 May, Haecker spotted two old Royal Navy destroyers, Brazen and Recruit, about 30 nautical miles (56 km; 35 mi) southwest of the Galloper light vessel. Just before noon, Haecker launched a torpedo that hit Recruit and split the 335-tonne (330-long-ton) displacement ship in half, killing 34 men; 26 men were rescued. One month later, on 1 June, UB-6 sank what would be her largest ship, the British cargo ship Saidieh, of 3,303 gross register tons (GRT). Saidieh was en route to Hull from Alexandria with a load of onions and cottonseed when UB-6 sank her at the mouth of the Thames; eight crewmen lost their lives in the attack.

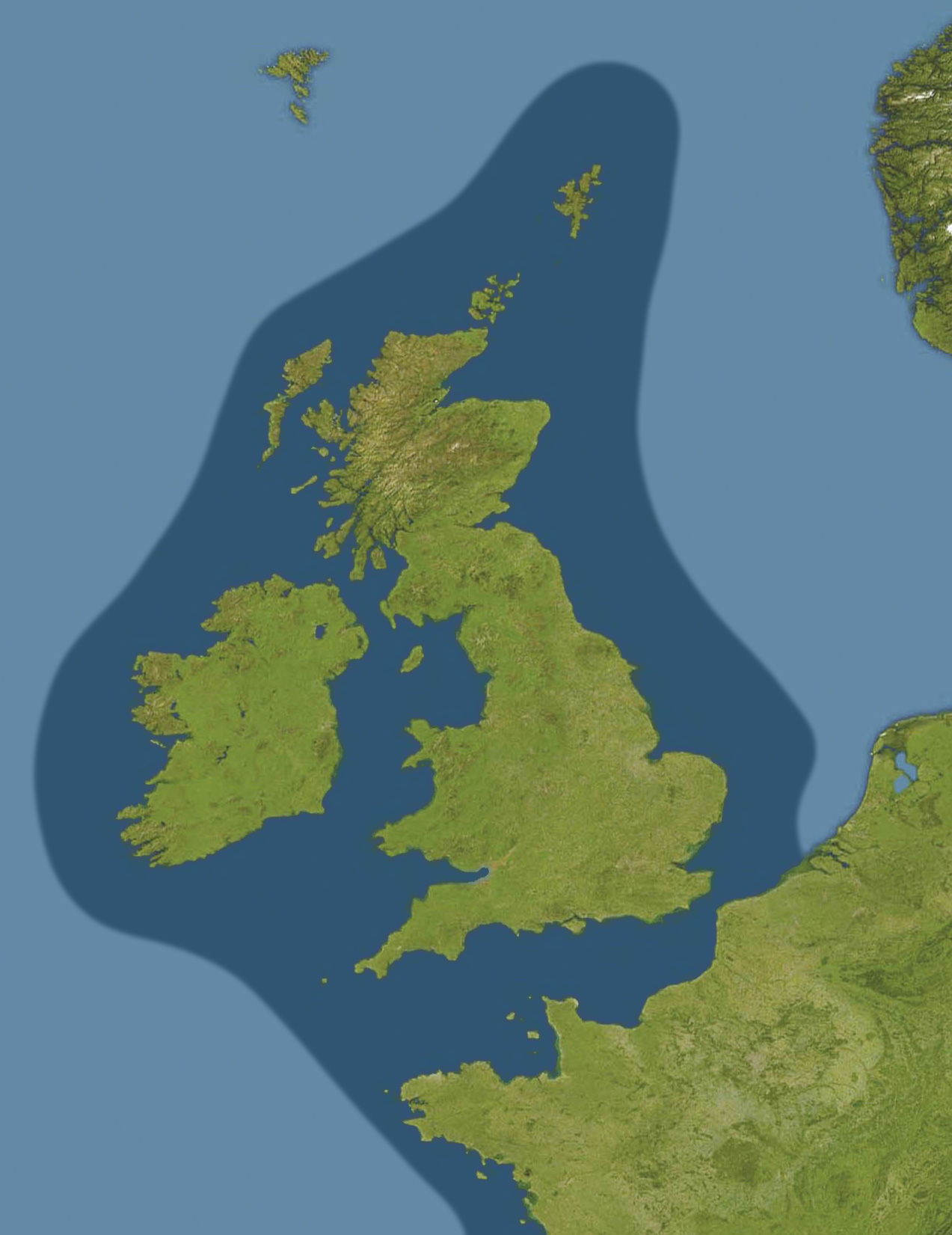
The German war zone (German: Kriegsgebiet) for the first submarine offensive.

In late June, Korvettenkapitän Karl Bartenbach, head of the Flanders Flotilla, used UB-6 to test a theory that British defenses in the Straits of Dover—anti-submarine nets and mines—were not insurmountable. On the evening of 21 June, UB-6 departed Zeebrugge for a round-trip to Boulogne. UB-6 sailed past Dunkirk on the surface and made Boulogne in the early morning of the 22nd, having to crash dive once during the voyage when discovered by a British destroyer. UB-6 immediately made the return trip and arrived safely at Zeebrugge later the same day. Three other UB I boats, UB-2, UB-5, and UB-10, soon followed with patrols in the Channel, but bad weather and fog hampered the boats and none had any success. Even though no ships were sunk during these forays into the English Channel, by successfully completing their voyages, the submarines helped further prove the feasibility of defeating the British countermeasures in the Straits of Dover.

On 12 July, while patrolling between 18 and 23 nautical miles (33 and 43 km; 21 and 26 mi) off Lowestoft, UB-6 attacked five British fishing vessels, sinking four of them. All four of the sunken ships were smacks—sailing vessels traditionally rigged with red ochre sails—which were stopped, boarded by crewmen from UB-6, and sunk with explosives. Two weeks later, UB-6 torpedoed and sank the 406 GRT Firth 4 nautical miles (7.4 km; 4.6 mi) from the Aldborough Napes Buoy. UB-6 sank the 57 GRT Leader, another smack, on 11 August.

Germany's submarine offensive was suspended on 18 September by the chief of the Admiralstab, Admiral Henning von Holtzendorff, in response to American demands after the sinking of the Cunard Line steamer Lusitania in May 1915 and other high-profile sinkings in August and September. Holtzendorff's directive ordered all U-boats out of the English Channel and the South-Western Approaches and required that all submarine activity in the North Sea be conducted strictly along prize regulations. It would be five months before UB-6 would sink another ship.

In mid-November, Oberleutnant zur See (Oblt.z.S.) Ernst Voigt succeeded Haecker as commander of UB-6; it was the first U-boat command for the 25-year-old Voigt. (Note: Voigt was in the Navy's April 1908 cadet class with 46 other future U-boat captains, including Reinhold Saltzwedel. See: Helgason, Guðmundur. "WWI Officer Crews: Crew 4/08". German and Austrian U-boats of World War I - Kaiserliche Marine - Uboat.net.) Under his command, UB-6 sank her next vessel in January 1916. The 57 GRT smack Crystal was boarded and sunk by explosives 25 nautical miles (46 km; 29 mi) southeast of Southwold on the 27th.

== Second submarine offensive ==
By early 1916, the British blockade of Germany was beginning to have an effect on Germany and her imports. The Royal Navy had stopped and seized more cargo destined for Germany than the quantity of cargo sunk by German U-boats in the first submarine offensive. As a result, the German Imperial Navy began a second offensive against merchant shipping on 29 February. The final ground rules agreed upon by the German Admiralstab were that all enemy vessels in Germany's self-proclaimed war zone would be destroyed without warning, that enemy vessels outside the war zone would be destroyed only if armed, and—to avoid antagonizing the United States—that enemy passenger steamers were not to be attacked, regardless of whether in the war zone or not.

UB-6's first attack in the new offensive came on 17 March, when the U-boat torpedoed the Swedish ship Ask near the North Hinder lightship. The 1,041 GRT ship was en route to London from Westervik with a load of timber, but did not sink; there were no reports of casualties on the damaged ship. The attack on Ask was followed up two weeks later by the sinking of another Swedish ship. The 1,115 GRT Hollandia was at anchor 0.25 nautical miles (460 m) from the Galloper lightship when UB-4 torpedoed her on the last day of March. Hollandia was in ballast and in the process of sailing from Rouen to Rotterdam when sent under without loss of life.

In March, UB-6's commander, Voigt, was assigned to the newly commissioned UB-23, and replaced on UB-6 by Kapitänleutnant Karl Neumann, the former commander of two of the submarine's sister ships, UB-2 and UB-13. (Note: Neumann was in the Navy's April 1907 cadet class with 34 other future U-boat captains, including Werner Fürbringer, Heino von Heimburg, Hans Howaldt, Otto Steinbrinck, and Ralph Wenninger. See: Helgason, Guðmundur. "WWI Officer Crews: Crew 4/07". German and Austrian U-boats of World War I - Kaiserliche Marine - Uboat.net.) In his U-boat career, Neumann sank over 100,000 tons of shipping, but only sank one ship at the helm of UB-6. In July, Neumann was succeeded by Oberleutnant zur See Karsten von Heydebreck, a 26-year-old, first-time U-boat captain, who was Voigt's classmate in April 1908 cadet class.

Near the end of April 1916, Admiral Reinhardt Scheer, the newest commander-in-chief of the German High Seas Fleet, called off the merchant shipping offensive and ordered all boats at sea to return, and all boats in port to remain there. As with the end of the first offensive in August 1915, UB-6 would not sink any more ships for the next five months.

== Grand Fleet ambush attempts ==
In mid-May, Scheer completed plans to draw out part of the British Grand Fleet. The German High Seas Fleet would sortie for a raid on Sunderland, luring the British fleet across "'nests' of submarines and mine-fields". In support of the operation, UB-6 and five other Flanders boats set out at midnight 30/31 May to form a line 18 nautical miles (33 km; 21 mi) east of Lowestoft. (Note: The other five boats for the May action were UB-10, UB-12, UB-16, UB-17, and UB-29.) This group was to intercept and attack the British light forces from Harwich, should they sortie north to join the battle. Unfortunately for the Germans, the British Admiralty had intelligence reports of the departure of the submarines which, coupled with an absence of attacks on shipping, aroused British suspicions.

A delayed departure of the German fleet for its sortie (which had been redirected to the Skagerrak) and the failure of several of the U-boats stationed to the north to receive the coded message warning of the British advance caused Scheer's anticipated ambush to be a "complete and disappointing failure". In UB-6's group, only UB-10 sighted the Harwich forces, and they were too far away to mount an attack. The failure of the submarine ambush to sink any British capital ships allowed the full Grand Fleet to engage the numerically inferior High Seas Fleet in the Battle of Jutland, which took place 31 May – 1 June.

Later in August, the Germans set up another ambush for the British fleet, when they drew up plans for another High Seas Fleet raid on Sunderland (as had been the original intention in May). The German fleet planned to depart late in the day on 18 August and shell military targets the next morning. As in May, UB-6 was part of a group intended to attack the Harwich forces. As one of five boats forming the second line of boats from the Flanders Flotilla, (Note: The other four boats for the August action were UB-12, UB-16, UB-19, and UB-37.) UB-6 was stationed off Texel by the morning of 20 August. Once again, British intelligence had given warning of the impending attack and ambush, causing the Grand Fleet to sortie at 16:00 on 18 August, five hours before the German fleet sailed. Faulty intelligence caused Scheer initially to divert from Sunderland, and then to eventually call off the whole operation. Although U-boats to the north sank two British light cruisers, (Note: U-52 sank HMS Nottingham; U-66 and U-63 teamed up to sink HMS Falmouth.) UB-6 and her group played no part in the action.

On 10 September, UB-6 was patrolling off the Meuse (Maas) lightship and torpedoed the 400 GRT Norwegian steamer Lindborg, with a general cargo for London; there were no casualties. While patrolling in the same area on the 23rd, UB-6 sank four Belgian lighters. The following day, the Dutch ship Batavier II was seized as a prize and sailed into Zeebrugge by a prize crew from UB-6. (Note: Batavier II was sunk by gunfire from British submarine E55 north of Texel on 27 July 1917. See: "Batavier II (5600938)". Miramar Ship Index.) Batavier II was the last success for Heydebreck in command of UB-6; he was assigned to command the newly commissioned minelaying submarine UC-63 in January 1917. Oberleutnant zur See Oskar Steckelberg, another member of the April 1908 cadet class, replaced Heydebreck on UB-6.

== Unrestricted submarine warfare ==
The British blockade of Germany, which prevented neutral shipping from reaching German ports, had severely limited imports of food and fuel into Germany. Among the results were an increase in infant mortality and as many as 700,000 deaths attributed to starvation or hypothermia during the war. With the blockade having such dire consequences, Kaiser Wilhelm II personally approved a resumption of unrestricted submarine warfare to begin on 1 February 1917 to help force the British to make peace. The new rules of engagement specified that no ship was to be left afloat.

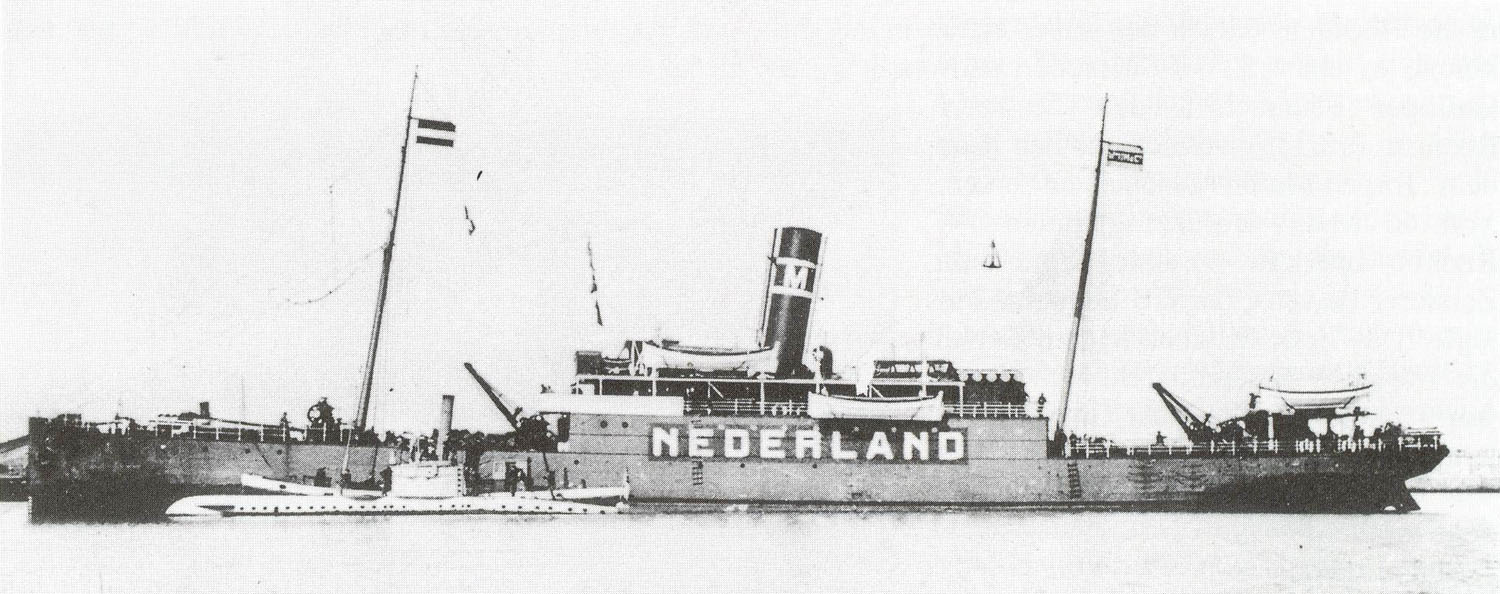
SM UB-6 in Hellevoetsluis

On 10 March, UB-6 departed Zeebrugge to patrol off the Mass lightship. Two days later, UB-6 entered Dutch territorial waters after Steckelberg made a navigational error, and ran aground at the mouth of the Meuse (Maas). Because the Netherlands was neutral during the war, and UB-6 did not leave Dutch territorial waters within 24 hours as required by international law, the submarine and her crew were interned by the Dutch. The Germans protested, but because UB-6's grounding was merely the result of an error and not because of distress, the Dutch could not release the submarine. UB-6 was taken to the port of Hellevoetsluis for internment, where, on 18 March, UB-6's crew scuttled her. The crew of UB-6 was interned for the duration of the war. After the end of the war, UB-6's wreck was surrendered to France, taken to Brest, and broken up in July 1921.

== Summary of raiding history ==
Ships sunk or damaged by SM UB-6
Date	Name	Nationality	Tonnage (Note: Merchant ship tonnages are in gross register tons. Military vessels are listed by tons displacement)	Fate
1 May 1915	HMS Recruit	Royal Navy	335	Sunk
1 June 1915	Saidieh	United Kingdom	3,303	Sunk
12 July 1915	Emerald	United Kingdom	57	Damaged
12 July 1915	Merlin	United Kingdom	47	Sunk
12 July 1915	Purple Heather	United Kingdom	42	Sunk
12 July 1915	Speedwell	United Kingdom	38	Sunk
12 July 1915	Woodbine	United Kingdom	29	Sunk
25 July 1915	Firth	United Kingdom	406	Sunk
11 August 1915	Leader	United Kingdom	57	Sunk
27 January 1916	Crystal	United Kingdom	57	Sunk
17 March 1916	Ask	Sweden	1,041	Damaged
31 March 1916	Hollandia	Sweden	1,115	Sunk
23 June 1916	Alexander Maurice	Belgium	70	Sunk
10 September 1916	Lindborg	Norway	400	Sunk
23 September 1916	Germaine	Belgium	106	Sunk
23 September 1916	Lichtevreden II	Belgium	69	Sunk
23 September 1916	Maria Da Jonge	Belgium	98	Sunk
23 September 1916	Rosalie	Belgium	129	Sunk
24 September 1916	Batavier II	Netherlands	1,328	Captured as prize
		(Note: Tonnage of ships captured as prizes is included in tonnage sunk.)Sunk: Damaged: Total:	7,629; 1,098; 8,727	

== Victims Gallery ==
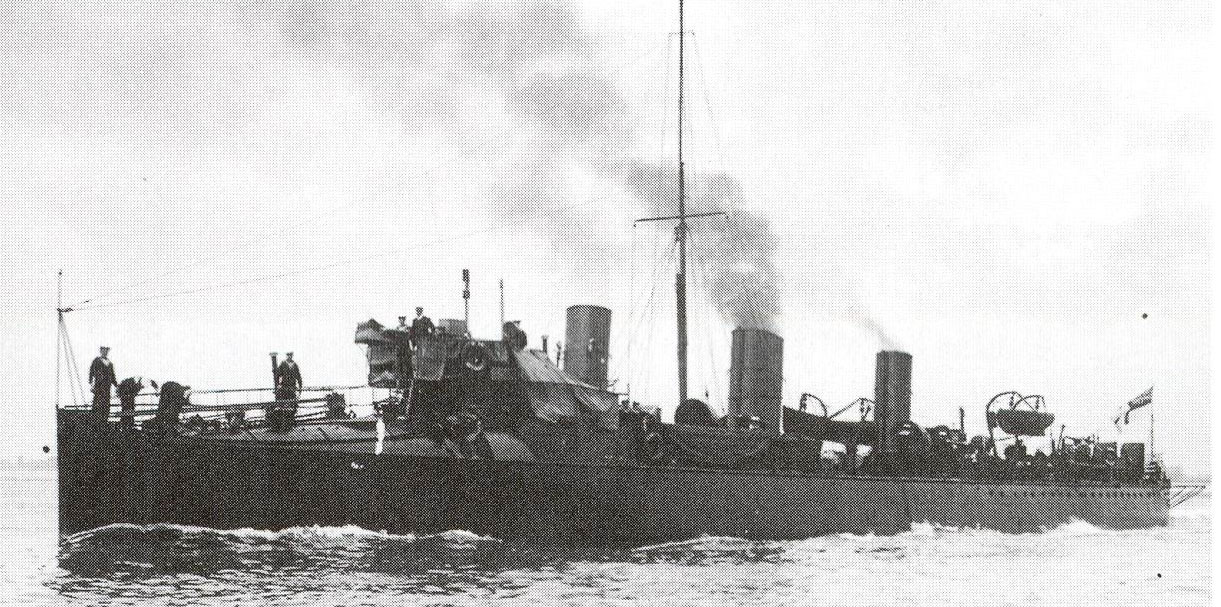
HMS Recruit, first victim of UB-6

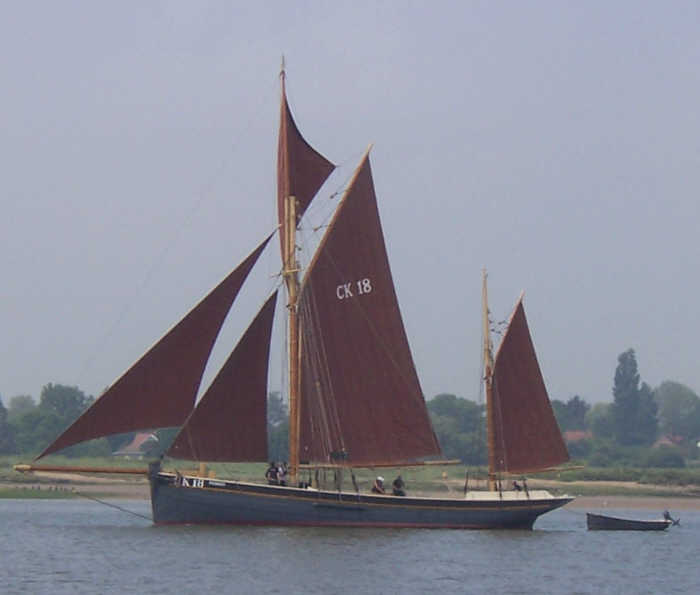
Several of UB-6's victims were fishing smacks, traditionally outfitted with red ochre sails

SS Hollandia, a Swedish cargo ship, was sunk by UB-6 in March 1916.

== Bibliography ==
- Bendert, Harald (2000). Die UB-Boote der Kaiserlichen Marine, 1914-1918. Einsätze, Erfolge, Schicksal (in German). Hamburg: Verlag E.S. Mittler & Sohn GmbH. ISBN 3-8132-0713-7.
- Gröner, Erich; Jung, Dieter; Maass, Martin (1991). U-boats and Mine Warfare Vessels. German Warships 1815–1945. Vol. 2. Translated by Thomas, Keith; Magowan, Rachel. London: Conway Maritime Press. ISBN 0-85177-593-4.
- Gardiner, Robert; Gray, Randal, eds. (1985). Conway's All the World's Fighting Ships 1906–1921. Annapolis, Maryland: Naval Institute Press. ISBN 978-0-87021-907-8. OCLC 12119866.
- Gibson, R. H.; Maurice Prendergast (2003) [1931]. The German Submarine War, 1914–1918. Annapolis, Maryland: Naval Institute Press. ISBN 9781591143147. OCLC 52924732.
- Karau, Mark D. (2003). Wielding the Dagger: the MarineKorps Flandern and the German War Effort, 1914–1918. Westport, Connecticut: Praeger. ISBN 978-0-313-32475-8. OCLC 51204317.
- Messimer, Dwight R. (2002). Verschollen: World War I U-boat losses. Annapolis, Maryland: Naval Institute Press. ISBN 978-1-55750-475-3. OCLC 231973419.
- Miller, David (2002). The Illustrated Directory of Submarines of the World. St. Paul, Minnesota: MBI Pub. Co. ISBN 978-0-7603-1345-9. OCLC 50208951.
- Tarrant, V. E. (1989). The U-Boat Offensive: 1914–1945. Annapolis, Maryland: Naval Institute Press. ISBN 978-0-87021-764-7. OCLC 20338385.
- Williamson, Gordon (2002). U-boats of the Kaiser's Navy. Oxford: Osprey. ISBN 978-1-84176-362-0. OCLC 48627495.
