= HMS Lydiard (1914) =

Destroyer of the Royal Navy

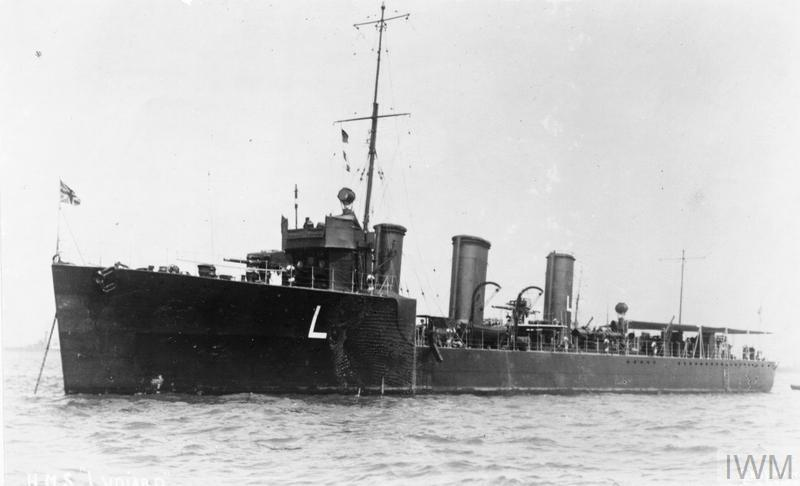
- Lydiard

History

United Kingdom
- Name: HMS Lydiard
- Builder: Fairfield Shipbuilding and Engineering Company, Govan
- Launched: 26 February 1914
- Fate: Sold for scrapping, November 1921

General characteristics
- Class & type: Laforey-class destroyer
- Displacement: 965–1,010 long tons (980–1,026 t)
- Length: 268 ft 10 in (81.94 m) o/a
- Beam: 27 ft 8 in (8.43 m)
- Draught: 10 ft 6 in (3.20 m)
- Installed power: 24,500 shp (18,300 kW); 4 × Yarrow boilers
- Propulsion: 2 Shafts; 2 steam turbines
- Speed: 29 knots (54 km/h; 33 mph)
- Range: 1,720 nmi (3,190 km; 1,980 mi) at 15 knots (28 km/h; 17 mph)
- Complement: 74
- Armament: 3 × QF 4-inch (102 mm) Mark IV guns; 2 × QF 1.5-pounder (37 mm) or QF 2-pounder (40 mm) "pom-pom" anti-aircraft guns; 2 × twin 21-inch (533 mm) torpedo tubes

HMS Lydiard was a Laforey-class destroyer built for the Royal Navy during the 1910s.

== Description ==
The Laforey class were improved and faster versions of the preceding Acasta class. They displaced 965–1,010 long tons (980–1,026 t). The ships had an overall length of 268 feet 10 inches (81.9 m), a beam of 27 feet 8 inches (8.4 m) and a draught of 10 feet 6 inches (3.2 m). Lydiard was powered by two Brown-Curtis direct-drive steam turbines, each driving one propeller shaft, using steam provided by four Yarrow boilers. The turbines developed a total of 24,500 shaft horsepower (18,300 kW) and gave a maximum speed of 29 knots (54 km/h; 33 mph). The ships carried a maximum of 280 long tons (280 t) of fuel oil that gave them a range of 1,750 nautical miles (3,240 km; 2,010 mi) at 15 knots (28 km/h; 17 mph). The ships' complement was 74 officers and ratings.

The ships were armed with three single QF 4-inch (102 mm) Mark IV guns and two QF 1.5-pounder (37 mm) anti-aircraft guns. These latter guns were later replaced by a pair of QF 2-pounder (40 mm) "pom-pom" anti-aircraft guns. The ships were also fitted with two above-water twin mounts for 21-inch (533 mm) torpedoes.

== Construction and service ==
The ship was ordered as Waverley from Fairfield Shipbuilding and Engineering Company as part of the 1912–13 programme, but was renamed Lydiard before being launched on 26 February 1914. She served with the 3rd Destroyer Flotilla, and fought at the Battle of Heligoland Bight in 1914, where she was credited with torpedoing the German light cruiser SMS Mainz.

Lydiard also took part in the Battle of Jutland in 1916, where she formed part of the 9th Destroyer Flotilla, along with her sister ships Liberty, Landrail and Laurel, supporting Admiral Beatty's battlecruisers. She was transferred to escort duties after 1917, and sold for breaking in November 1921.

== Bibliography ==
- Campbell, John. Jutland: An Analysis of the Fighting. London: Conway Maritime Press, 1998. ISBN 0 85177 750 3.
- Colledge, J. J.; Warlow, Ben (2006) [1969]. Ships of the Royal Navy: The Complete Record of All Fighting Ships of the Royal Navy from the 15th Century to the Present (3rd Rev ed.). London: Chatham Publishing. ISBN 978-1-86176-281-8. OCLC 67375475.
- Dittmar, F.J. & Colledge, J.J. (1972). British Warships 1914–1919. Shepperton, UK: Ian Allan. ISBN 0-7110-0380-7.
- Friedman, Norman (2009). British Destroyers: From Earliest Days to the Second World War. Barnsley, UK: Seaforth Publishing. ISBN 978-1-84832-049-9.
- Gardiner, Robert & Gray, Randal (1985). Conway's All The World's Fighting Ships 1906–1921. London: Conway Maritime Press. ISBN 0-85177-245-5.
