= HMS Brazen (1896) =

Former Royal Navy destroyer (1896–1919)

History

United Kingdom
- Name: Brazen
- Ordered: 1895 – 1896 Naval Estimates
- Builder: J & G Thompson, Clydebank
- Laid down: 18 October 1895
- Launched: 3 July 1896
- Commissioned: July 1900
- Out of service: Laid up in reserve 1919
- Fate: 4 November 1919 to J.H. Lee for breaking

General characteristics
- Class & type: Clydebank three-funnel, 30-knot destroyer
- Displacement: 380 long tons (386 t) standard; 425 long tons (432 t) full load; 214 ft (65 m) o/a; 20 ft (6.1 m) Beam; 8 ft 6 in (2.59 m) Draught
- Propulsion: 4 × Thornycroft water tube boiler; 2 × Vertical Triple Expansion (VTE) steam engines driving 2 shafts producing 5,800 shp (4,300 kW)
- Speed: 30 kn (56 km/h)
- Range: 80 tons coal; 1,465 nmi (2,713 km) at 11 kn (20 km/h; 13 mph)
- Complement: 63 officers and men
- Armament: 1 × QF 12-pounder 12 cwt Mark I L/40 naval gun on a P Mark I Low angle mount; 5 × QF 6-pdr 8 cwt naval gun L/40 Naval gun on a Mark I* low angle mount; 2 × single tubes for 18-inch (450mm) torpedoes

Service record
- Operations: World War I 1914 - 1918

HMS Brazen was a Clydebank three-funnel, 30-knot destroyer ordered by the Royal Navy under the 1895-1896 Naval Estimates. She was the fifth ship to carry this name since it was introduced in 1781 for a 14-gun cutter, sold in 1799.

== Construction and career ==
She was laid down as yard number 289 on 18 October 1895 at J & G Thompson shipyard in Clydebank and launched on 3 July 1896. During her builder's trials, she had problems attaining her contract speed. Her hull was lengthened by 4 feet (1.2 m), then she made her contract speed of 30 knots (56 km/h; 35 mph). In 1899 during the construction of these ships, steelmaker John Brown and Company of Sheffield bought J&G Thomson's Clydebank yard for £923,255 3s 3d. She was completed and accepted by the Royal Navy in July 1900. After commissioning she was assigned to the Chatham Division of the Harwich Flotilla. She was deployed in Home waters for her entire service life. In June 1902 she took the place of HMS Zephyr in the Portsmouth instructional flotilla.

On 30 August 1912 the Admiralty directed all destroyer classes were to be designated by alpha characters starting with the letter 'A'. Since her design speed was 30 knots (56 km/h; 35 mph) and she had three funnels, she was assigned to the C class. After 30 September 1913, she was known as a C-class destroyer and had the letter 'C' painted on the hull below the bridge area and on either the fore or aft funnel.

=== World War I ===
In 1914 she was in active commission at the Nore based at Shearness tendered to HMS Actaeon, a Royal Navy training establishment. With the outbreak of hostilities in August 1914 she was assigned to the Nore Local Flotilla. Her duties included anti-submarine and counter-mining patrols in the Thames Estuary.

In 1919 she was paid off and laid-up in reserve awaiting disposal. She was sold on 4 November 1919 to J.H. Lee for breaking.

== Pennant Numbers ==
Pennant Number	From	To
N11	6 Dec 1914	1 Sep 1915
D47	1 Sep 1915	1 Jan 1918
D14	1 Jan 1918	4 Nov 1919

== Bibliography ==
- Chesneau, Roger & Kolesnik, Eugene M., eds. (1979). Conway's All The World's Fighting Ships 1860–1905. London: Conway Maritime Press. ISBN 0-85177-133-5.
- Colledge, J. J.; Warlow, Ben (2006) [1969]. Ships of the Royal Navy: The Complete Record of All Fighting Ships of the Royal Navy from the 15th Century to the Present (3rd Rev ed.). London: Chatham Publishing. ISBN 978-1-86176-281-8. OCLC 67375475.
- Dittmar, F. J. & Colledge, J. J. (1972). British Warships 1914–1919. Shepperton, UK: Ian Allan. ISBN 0-7110-0380-7.
- Friedman, Norman (2009). British Destroyers: From Earliest Days to the Second World War. Barnsley, UK: Seaforth Publishing. ISBN 978-1-84832-049-9.
- Gardiner, Robert & Gray, Randal, eds. (1985). Conway's All The World's Fighting Ships 1906–1921. London: Conway Maritime Press. ISBN 0-85177-245-5.
- Lyon, David (2001) [1996]. The First Destroyers. London: Caxton Editions. ISBN 1-84067-3648.
- Manning, T. D. (1961). The British Destroyer. London: Putnam & Co. OCLC 6470051.
- March, Edgar J. (1966). British Destroyers: A History of Development, 1892–1953; Drawn by Admiralty Permission From Official Records & Returns, Ships' Covers & Building Plans. London: Seeley Service. OCLC 164893555.
