= Harwich Force =

British Naval squadron during WWI

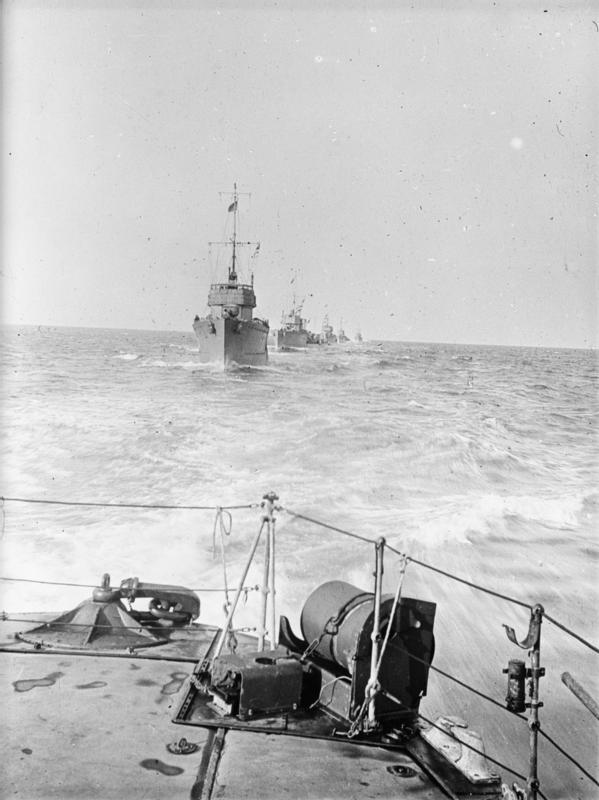
- Destroyers of the Harwich Force in line ahead
- Active: 1914–1918
- Country: United Kingdom
- Allegiance: British Empire
- Branch: Royal Navy
- Type: Naval Fleet
- Engagements: Battle of Heligoland Bight; Battle off Texel; Battle of Dogger Bank; Battle off Noordhinder Bank

Commanders
- Notable commanders: Reginald Tyrwhitt

The Harwich Force originally called Harwich Striking Force was a squadron of the Royal Navy, formed during the First World War and based in Harwich. It played a significant role in the war.

== History ==
After the outbreak of the First World War, it was important for the Royal Navy was to secure the approaches to the English Channel, to prevent elements of the Imperial German Navy (Kaiserliche Marine) from breaking out into the Atlantic or from interfering with British maritime trade and troop convoys to the continent. Most of the big ships of the Grand Fleet had dispersed to the navy's anchorage at Scapa Flow or to other north-eastern ports to watch the northern route from the North Sea into the Atlantic. Patrol flotillas were organised along the south and east coasts of England, with commands established at several ports in the region. The Dover Patrol was based at Dover, consisting mostly of destroyers, while a number of pre-dreadnoughts and cruisers were based at Portland Harbour. A large number of destroyers, flotilla leaders and light cruisers were based at Harwich, under the command of Commodore Reginald Tyrwhitt.

== Composition ==
The Harwich Force consisted of between four and eight light cruisers, several flotilla leaders and usually between 30 and 40 destroyers in flotillas, the number varying. Also stationed at Harwich was a submarine force under Commodore Roger Keyes. In early 1917, the Harwich Force consisted of eight light cruisers, two flotilla leaders and 45 destroyers. By the end of the year, there were nine light cruisers, four flotilla leaders and 24 destroyers. The combination of light, fast ships was intended for scouting, reconnaissance, engaging German light forces and frustrating German attempts at minelaying in the Channel.

== Rear-Admirals ==
Post holders included:

	Rank	Flag	Name	Term	Notes
Rear-Admiral Commanding, Harwich Force
1	Rear-Admiral	Rear-Admiral - Royal Navy	Reginald Tyrwhitt	7 April 1914 – 1 May 1919	receiving shore support from FOIC, Harwich
2	Rear-Admiral	Rear-Admiral - Royal Navy	George Holmes Borrett	1 March 1919	ditto
Rear-Admiral-in-Charge, Harwich
1	Rear-Admiral	Rear-Admiral - Royal Navy	George Cuthbert Cayley	2 July 1917 – 31 March 1918	in charge of the base at Harwich Dockyard
2	Rear-Admiral	Rear-Admiral - Royal Navy	Cecil Spencer Hickley	1 April 1918 – 1 March 1919	ditto

== Service ==
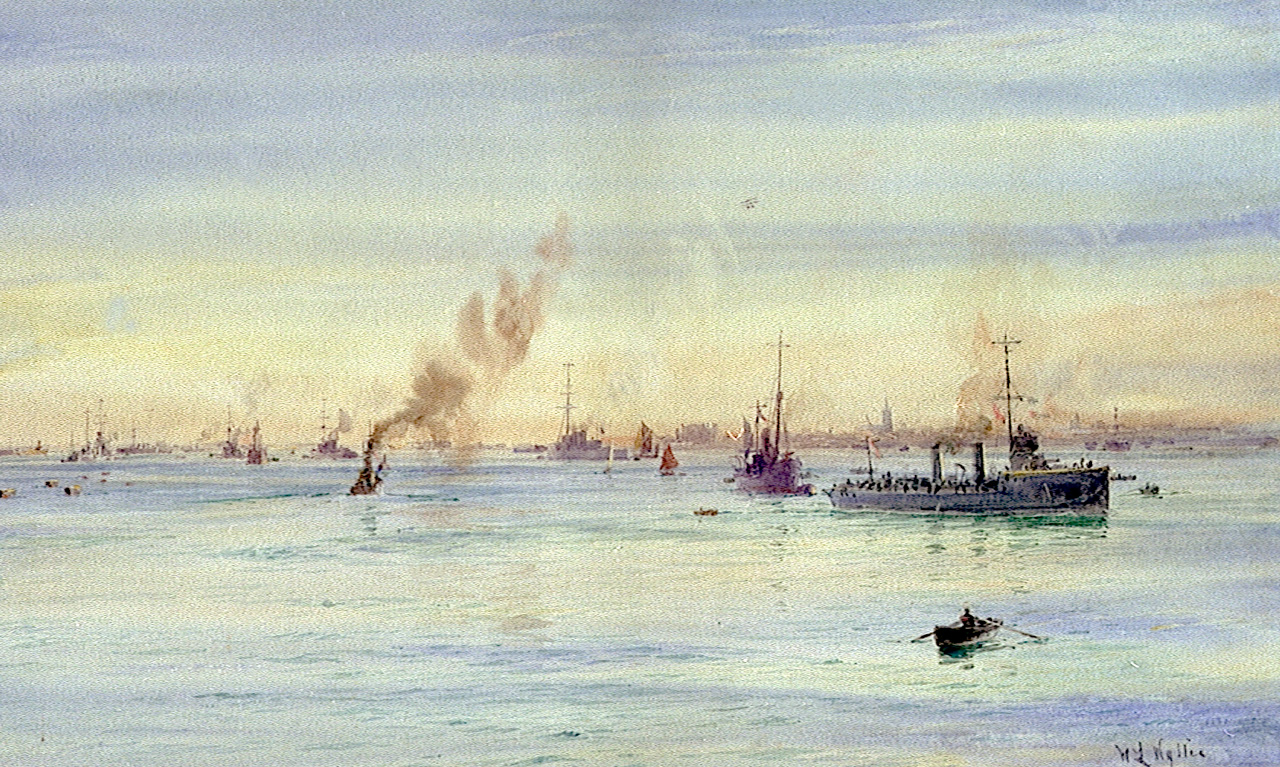
Painting depicting Harwich Force at anchor in 1914, by William Lionel Wyllie.

It was intended that the Harwich Force would operate when possible in conjunction with the Dover Patrol, and the Admiralty intended that the Harwich force would also be able to support the Grand Fleet if it moved into the area. Tyrwhitt was also expected to carry out reconnaissance of German naval activities in the southern parts of the North Sea, and to escort ships sailing between the Thames and the Netherlands. Tyrwhitt's objectives were often complicated by the need to provide reinforcements for the Dover Patrol. The force fired the first shots of the war when a flotilla led by HMS Amphion sank the minelayer Königin Luise on 5 August 1914. During the war, the Force captured or sank 24 enemy merchants, and it escorted 520 eastbound and 511 westbound ships between Dutch and British ports. Their ships also took part in the Cuxhaven Raid on Christmas Day, 1914.

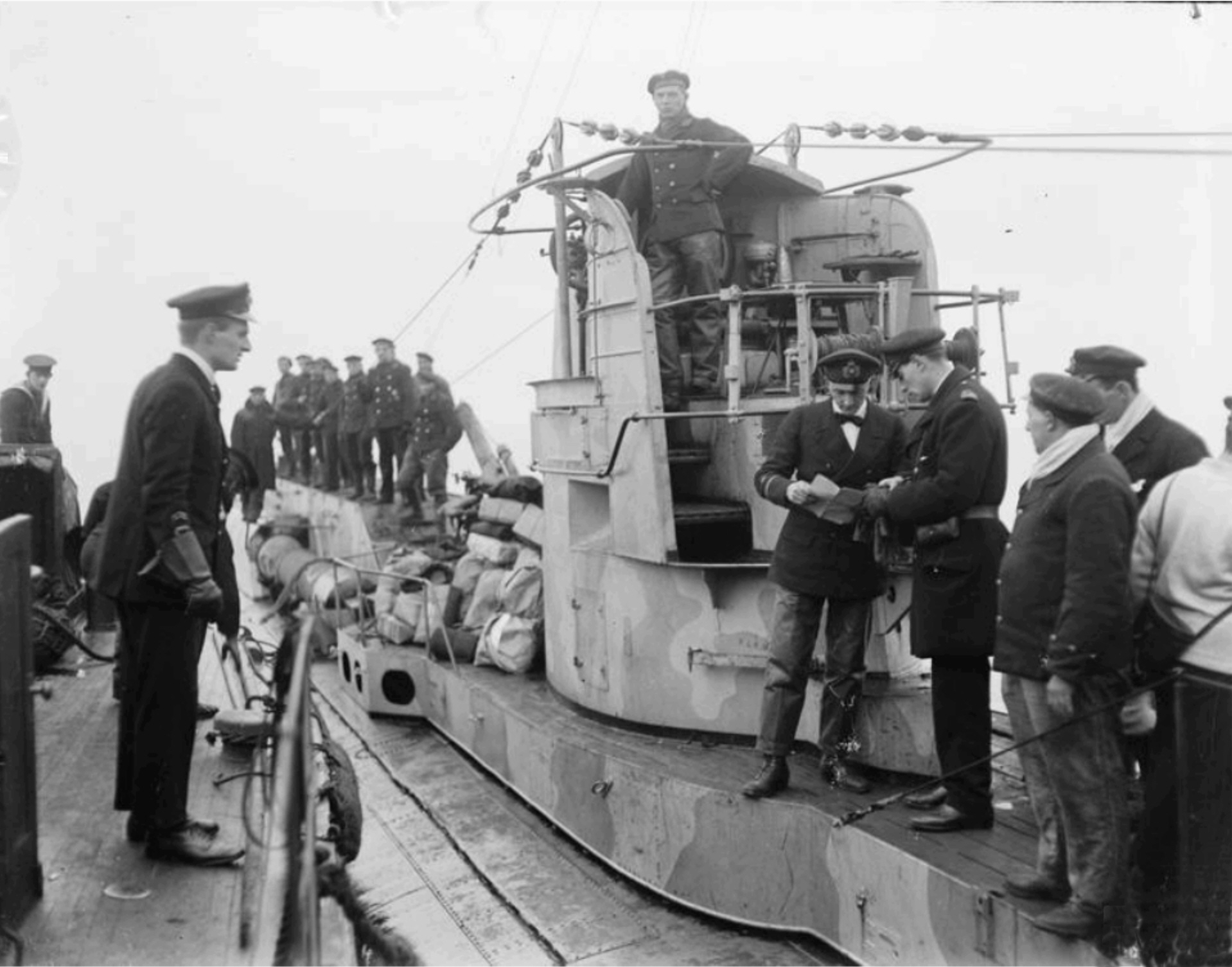
Surrender of U-Boats at Harwich: A British officer boards a U-boat at Harwich to examine her papers

The force was also active in a number of clashes with the Kaiserliche Marine (Imperial German Navy). Their ships were present at the Battles of Heligoland Bight, Texel, and Dogger Bank, and were mobilised after the German raids on Scarborough, Hartlepool and Whitby in 1914, and on Yarmouth and Lowestoft in 1916. They were called out during the prelude to the Battle of Jutland but did not take part in the battle.

During the winter of 1916–1917, the force assisted the Dover Patrol in patrolling the Dover Barrage, an anti-submarine steel netting barrier which required on a large number of small vessels to operate and were vulnerable to attack by German destroyers and torpedo boats. Other regular patrols were mounted in The Downs, an anchorage in the eastern part of the Channel and another net barrage which was laid parallel to the Belgian coast. Forays along the coast of Germany sometimes resulted in the sinking or capture of German fishing vessels; on one sweep in 1915, twenty captured trawlers were brought to Harwich as prizes. Another duty was coastal bombardment of German positions in occupied Belgium; on one mission to bombard Ostend on 5 June 1917, Tyrwhitt's flagship, HMS Centaur, sank the German torpedo boat S.20 off Zeebrugge.

After the end of the war, Harwich was designated the port at which the remaining German U-boats would be surrendered and Harwich Force oversaw the operation.

== Battle of Jutland ==
At the end of May 1916, at the time of the Battle of Jutland, the Harwich force consisted of:

- 5th Light Cruiser Squadron:
  - Carysfort (Commodore Tyrwhitt)
  - Cleopatra (Captain F. P. Loder-Symonds)
  - Conquest (Captain Roger Backhouse)
  - Canterbury (Captain Percy Royds, detached to Grand Fleet)
  - Penelope (Captain Hubert Lynes; undergoing repairs)
  - Vindex, a seaplane carrier (detached to Rosyth, Scotland)
- 9th Destroyer Flotilla
  - light cruiser Undaunted (Capt. Francis G. St.John)
  - destroyer leader Nimrod
  - 17 (L-class) destroyers (Laforey, Lance, Lark, Lassoo, Laverock, Lawford, Leonidas, Lookout, Loyal, Lysander; detached to the Battlecruiser Fleet: Landrail, Laurel, Liberty, Lydiard; in repairs or refitting: Laertes, Lennox, Lucifer)
- 10th Destroyer Flotilla
  - light cruiser Aurora (Capt. Wilmot S. Nicholson)
  - destroyer leader Lightfoot
  - 15 M-class and 3 Talisman-class destroyers. Manly, Mentor, Miranda, Murray, Milne, Myngs; attached to the 3rd Battle Squadron at The Nore: Mastiff, Matchless; detached to the Battlecruiser fleet: Moorsom, Morris, Termagant, Turbulent; in repairs or refit: Melpomene, Medea, Meteor, Trident, Mansfield, Minos.

The Harwich Force sortied to join the Grand Fleet on the initiative of Commodore Tyrwhitt early on 1 June 1916 in the hope that it might help should the action be re-joined later in the day but it was recalled by the Admiralty a few hours later and told to await orders. The following ships had sortied:

light cruisers: Carysfort, Cleopatra, Conquest, Aurora, Undaunted
flotilla leaders Nimrod, Lightfoot
destroyers:

1st Division: Laforey, Lookout, Lawford, Laverock
2nd Division: Lance, Lassoo, Lysander, Lark
3rd Division: Loyal, Leonidas, Mentor, Miranda
4th Division: Manly, Murray, Milne, Myngs

== See also ==
- HMS Ben-my-Chree
- HMS Curacoa
- HMS Engadine
- HMS Empress
- HMS Riviera
- Seaplane Experimental Station
