= Chilean ship Almirante Riveros =

At least four ships of the Chilean navy have been named Almirante Riveros, after Galvarino Riveros Cárdenas, a Chilean admiral:

- Chilean destroyer Almirante Riveros (1915), the original name of the Faulknor-class flotilla leader HMS Tipperary (1915)
- Chilean destroyer Almirante Riveros (1914), the name of the former HMS Faulknor, delivered to Chile in 1920 as part of the Almirante Williams class
- Chilean destroyer Almirante Riveros (DDG-18) was the first ship of the Almirante-class destroyer, commissioned 1962, decommissioned 1995
- Chilean frigate Almirante Riveros (FF-18), a Karel Doorman-class frigate, launched as HNLMS Tjerk Hiddes in 1989, acquired in 2007
