= List of ships sunk at the Battle of Jutland =

The List of ships sunk at the Battle of Jutland is a list of ships which were lost during the Battle of Jutland.

This battle was fought between the British Royal Navy's Grand Fleet and the Imperial German Navy's High Seas Fleet on 31 May and 1 June 1916, during the First World War. The list is in chronological order of the time of sinking.

Time of Sinking	Main damage	Name of the ship	Type	Lives lost	Survivors
31 May 16:03	Battlecruiser action	(United Kingdom) Indefatigable	Battlecruiser	1,017	3 (POW)
31 May 16:25	Battlecruiser action	(United Kingdom) Queen Mary	Battlecruiser	1,266	9 (2 POW)
31 May 17:30	Battlecruiser action	(United Kingdom) Nomad	Destroyer	8	72 (POW)
31 May 17:30	Battlecruiser action	(United Kingdom) Nestor	Destroyer	6	68 (POW)
31 May 17:30	Battlecruiser action	(German Empire) V27	Torpedo boat		crew evacuated
31 May 17:45	Battlecruiser action	(German Empire) V29	Torpedo boat	33-43	crew evacuated
31 May 18:20	Fleet action	(United Kingdom) Defence	Armoured cruiser	903	none
31 May 18:30	Fleet action	(United Kingdom) Invincible	Battlecruiser	1,026	6
31 May 19:02	Fleet action	(United Kingdom) Shark	Destroyer	86	6
31 May 19:30	Fleet action	(German Empire) S35	Torpedo boat	87	none
31 May 20:05	Fleet action	(German Empire) V48	Torpedo boat	90	1
31 May 22:35	Night action	(German Empire) Frauenlob	Light cruiser	320	9
31 May 23:30	Night action	(United Kingdom) Ardent	Destroyer	78	2
31 May 23:30	Night action	(United Kingdom) Fortune	Destroyer	67	1
1 June 00:00	Night action	(United Kingdom) Black Prince	Armoured cruiser	857	none
1 June 02:00	Night action	(German Empire) Wiesbaden	Light cruiser	589	1
1 June 02:05	Night action	(United Kingdom) Turbulent	Destroyer	90	13 (POW)
1 June 02:15	Night action	(German Empire) V4	Torpedo boat	18	crew evacuated
1 June 02:45	Night action	(United Kingdom) Tipperary	Destroyer	185	12
1 June 02:45	Fleet action	(German Empire) Lützow	Battlecruiser	115	crew evacuated
1 June 03:00	Night action	(German Empire) Elbing	Light cruiser	4	crew evacuated
1 June 03:10	Night action	(German Empire) Pommern	Pre-dreadnought	839	none
1 June 04:25	Night action	(German Empire) Rostock	Light cruiser	14	crew evacuated
1 June 07:30	Night action	(United Kingdom) Sparrowhawk	Destroyer	6	crew evacuated
1 June 08:25	Fleet action	(United Kingdom) Warrior	Armoured cruiser	68	crew evacuated

- Time-of-day versus "action" may vary, as some ships received their deadly damage during one action but limped through to a later time or even a later action.
- The majority of British loss of life came from Vice-Admiral Sir David Beatty's battlecruiser force, which lost Queen Mary and Indefatigable in the opening minutes, and Invincible two hours later, with a total of 3,309 lives lost.

== Sources ==
- Campbell, John (1998). Jutland: An Analysis of the Fighting. Lyons Press. ISBN 1-55821-759-2.
- Marder, Arthur J. (1978). From the Dreadnought to Scapa Flow, The Royal Navy in the Fisher Era, 1904–1919. Vol. III: Jutland and After, May 1916 – December 1916 (Second ed.). London: Oxford University Press. ISBN 0-19-215841-4.
- Wrecksite - WARSHIPS LOST AT THE BATTLE OF JUTLAND
- North East Medals The Battle of Jutland 1916 - Casualties Listed by Ship.
