= SMS G96 =

Torpedo boat of the Imperial German Navy

History

German Empire
- Name: SMS G96
- Builder: Germaniawerft, Kiel
- Launched: 16 September 1916
- Completed: 23 December 1916
- Fate: Mined 25 June 1917

General characteristics
- Class & type: 1916 Mob.
- Displacement: 990 t (970 long tons) design
- Length: 84.5 m (277 ft 3 in) o/a
- Beam: 8.4 m (27 ft 7 in)
- Draught: 3.4 m (11 ft 2 in)
- Installed power: 24,000 PS (24,000 shp; 18,000 kW)
- Propulsion: 3 × boilers; 2 × steam turbines, 1 × cruising turbine
- Speed: 32 kn (37 mph; 59 km/h)
- Complement: 105
- Armament: 3× 10.5 cm L/45 guns; 6× 50 cm (19.7 in) torpedo tubes

SMS G96 (Note: "SMS" stands for "Seiner Majestät Schiff" (transl. His Majesty's Ship)) (Note: The "G" in G96 denoted the shipbuilder who constructed her.) was a large torpedo boat of the Imperial German Navy that was built and served during the First World War. She was the prototype ship of the 1916 Mobilisation Type torpedo boats, and was launched at Germaniawerft's Kiel shipyard on 19 September 1916, completing in December that year.

G96 was deployed to the Flanders Flotilla in February 1917 and took part in several raids on British shipping in the English Channel. She was sunk by a mine on 26 June 1917.

== Construction and design ==
Work began in 1915 on construction of G96, the first example of an improved design of torpedo boat for the Imperial German Navy, which became known as the 1916 mobilisation type. (Note: The 1916 mobilisation type torpedo boat was a completely different design to the 1916 design type destroyer, which were much larger and carried a gun armament of four 15 cm (5.9 in) guns. The 1916 design type destroyers were built as the S113-class, with the first examples entering service at the end of the war.) The 1916 mobilisation type was an improved and enlarged derivative of the V25-class torpedo boat that had formed the bulk of German torpedo boat construction since 1913. The major differences were a longer forecastle and more freeboard, both of which improved seakeeping.

G96 was 84.5 metres (277 ft 3 in) long overall and 82.3 metres (270 ft 0 in) at the waterline, with a beam of 8.4 metres (27 ft 7 in) and a draught of 3.4 metres (11 ft 2 in). The ship displaced 990 tonnes (970 long tons) design and 1,147 tonnes (1,129 long tons) deep load.

Three oil-fired water-tube boilers fed steam at 18.5 standard atmospheres (272 psi) to two sets of Germania direct-drive steam turbines, each of which drove a propeller shaft. The starboard shaft was also fitted with a cruising turbine. The machinery was rated at 24,000 PS (24,000 shp), giving a design speed of 32 knots (37 mph; 59 km/h). Two funnels were fitted. 326 t of oil was carried, giving a range of 2,040 nautical miles (2,350 mi; 3,780 km) at 17 knots (20 mph; 31 km/h).

The ship was armed with three 10.5 cm (4.1 in) SK L/45 guns and six 50 cm (19.7 in) torpedo tubes, with two single tubes forward and two twin tubes aft of the ship's funnels, with the twin tubes angled out by 15 degrees. Up to 40 mines could be carried. The ship had a crew of 105 officers and men.

G96 was launched on 16 September 1916 and was completed on 23 December that year.

== Service ==
In February 1917, G96 was one of six large torpedo boats and four coastal torpedo boats that were sent as reinforcements to the German naval bases in Flanders, with the role of supporting submarine operations and carrying out offensive operations against the anti-submarine patrols and merchant shipping in the English Channel. G96 and the other nine torpedo boats arrived in Flanders on 18 February. On 25 February the Germans launched a major raid by the Flanders-based torpedo boats against Allied defences and shipping in the Channel. One group of five torpedo boats (the 1st Zeebrugge half-flotilla - G95, V67, V68, V47 and G96) were to operate against shipping near the North Foreland lighthouse and The Downs, while a second group of six torpedo boats (the 6th Flotilla) were to attack the patrol boats of the Dover Barrage, while three more torpedo boats were to attack shipping off the mouth of the River Maas. G96' s group carried out a brief bombardment of the North Foreland and Margate before withdrawing, hitting a house and killing three civilians but doing little other damage. The attack on the Dover Barrage withdrew after a confrontation with the British destroyer Laverock, while the patrol off the Mass encountered no ships.

The next major raid on the Channel took place on the night of March 17/18 1917. Two groups of torpedo boats, the seven ships of the 6th Flotilla and the five ships of the 1st Zeebrugge half-flotilla (V47, V67, V68, G95 and G96) were to operate against the Dover Barrage, with the 6th Flotilla attacking on the Northern side of the Channel and the 1st Zeebrugge half-flotilla operating to the south. Four more torpedo boats would attack shipping on the Downs. The 6th Flotilla encountered the British destroyer Paragon, on patrol in the Channel, and opened fire with guns and torpedoes. Paragon was hit by at least two torpedoes and sank. On seeing the explosion, Llewellyn, the next destroyer in the British patrol line, proceeded southwards to investigate, and had just switched on her searchlight to rescue survivors when she was torpedoed and badly damaged by ships of the German 6th Flotilla, which escaped to the east, joining up with the torpedo boats of the 1st Zeebrugge half-flotilla, including G96. The attack on the Downs sank a small steamer, the Greypoint and attacked several drifters on patrol.

The Flanders-based torpedo boat flotillas continued to launch sorties against the Channel, with the next encounter with the Royal Navy occurring on the night of April 20/21, in the Battle of Dover Strait. Six torpedo boats (Group Gautier) were to bombard Dover and attack the Dover Barrage on the north side of the channel, with six more (Group Albrecht – V47, V68, G70, G91, G95 and G96) were to attack Calais and the southern part of the barrage. Three more torpedo boats were to operate near the Downs. Group Albrecht arrived off Calais at about 23:15 hr and fired about 300 shells before withdrawing. Group Gautier fired on and damaged an armed trawler, the Sabreur, and ineffectually shelled Dover. On the return journey they were intercepted by the British destroyers Swift and Broke which sank the torpedo boats G42 and G85.

Another major role of the Flanders-based torpedo boat flotillas was minesweeping, with the British laying extensive minefields to restrict operations of Flanders-based submarines. On 25 June 1917 G96 was escorting minesweepers clearing a minefield off the Flanders coast when she stuck a mine and sank. Four of her crew were killed.
