= HMS Faulknor (1914) =

Destroyer of the Royal Navy

History

United Kingdom
- Name: Faulknor
- Ordered: 1912
- Builder: J. Samuel White, East Cowes
- Launched: 26 February 1914
- Completed: August 1914
- Acquired: August 1914
- Motto: Dulcit amor : Patria : 'Love of fatherland leads'
- Honours and awards: Jutland 1916; Dover Patrol 1916–18; Zeebrugge 1918; Ostend 1918
- Fate: Resold to Chile, 1920

Chile
- Name: Almirante Riveros
- Commissioned: 1920
- Decommissioned: 1933
- Fate: Sunk as a target, 10 April 1939

General characteristics
- Class & type: Faulknor-class destroyer leader
- Displacement: 1,700 long tons (1,700 t)
- Length: 331 ft (100.9 m)
- Beam: 32.6 ft (9.9 m)
- Draught: 11 ft (3.4 m)
- Installed power: 6 White-Forster boilers; 30,000 shp (22,000 kW)
- Propulsion: 3 shafts; steam turbines
- Speed: 31 knots (57 km/h; 36 mph)
- Range: 4,205 nmi (7,788 km; 4,839 mi) at 15 knots (28 km/h; 17 mph)
- Complement: 197
- Armament: As built; 6 × single 4 in (102 mm) guns; 4 × single tubes for 21 in (533 mm) torpedoes; As rearmed; 2 × single 4.7 in (120 mm) guns; 2 × single 4 inch guns; 2 × single 2 pdr 40 mm (1.6 in) AA gun; 2 × twin tubes for 21 in torpedoes

HMS Faulknor was a British destroyer of the First World War. She was purchased by the Royal Navy whilst still under construction in Britain for the Chilean Navy who had ordered her in 1912 as part of the Almirante Lynch class. She was renamed after the Faulknor family of British nineteenth century naval officers.

Faulknor was a large destroyer leader that served initially in the Grand Fleet, and took part in the Battle of Jutland in 1916. At the end of 1916, she transferred to the Dover Patrol, a force tasked with preventing German raiding craft gaining access to the English Channel. Faulknor carried out both defensive patrols and offensive operations against the coastline of German-held Belgium, taking part in both the First and Second Ostend Raid in the spring of 1918.

In 1920, following the end of the war, Faulknor and her surviving sisters were all returned to Chile, where she served as Almirante Riveros. She took part in the Chilean naval mutiny of 1931 and was stricken in 1933, being sunk as a target in 1939.

== Construction and design ==
In 1912, Chile placed an order for six large destroyers, the Almirante Lynch class, from the East Cowes, Isle of Wight shipbuilder J. Samuel White in response to large destroyers ordered by Argentina. Almirante Simpson, the third of the class, was launched on 26 February 1914 and purchased, almost complete, by the Royal Navy on the outbreak of the First World War in August 1914. (Note: Two members of the class, Almirante Lynch and Almirante Condell, had already been delivered to Chile.) She was renamed Faulknor (Note: Named for the 18th Century Royal Navy officer Robert Faulknor the younger, killed in 1795 while capturing the French frigate Pique.) and commissioned on 25 August 1914.

White's design was 331 feet 3 inches (101.0 m) long overall and 320 feet (97.5 m) between perpendiculars, with a beam of 32 feet 6 inches (9.9 m) and a draught of 11 feet 8 1/2 inches (3.57 m). Displacement was 1,430 long tons (1,450 t) normal and 1,800–1,850 long tons (1,830–1,880 t) at full load. Six White-Forster boilers with mixed fuel oil- and coal-firing fed steam at 220 pounds per square inch (1,500 kPa) to Parsons steam turbines driving three shafts. The machinery was rated at 30,000 shaft horsepower (22,000 kW), giving a speed of 31 knots (57 km/h; 36 mph). Four funnels were fitted, with one thin funnel forwards and three larger funnels. The forward funnel was raised by 6 feet (1.8 m) following sea trials. 403 tons of coal and 83 tons of oil were carried, giving a range of 4,205 nautical miles (7,788 km; 4,839 mi) at 15 knots (28 km/h; 17 mph).

The ship was completed with a main gun armament of six 4-inch (102 mm) Mk VI guns, with two mounted side-by-side on the ship's forecastle forward of the bridge, one on either side of the bridge, and two side-by-side right aft. These guns were of an Elswick design for export to Chile, and fired a 31-pound (14 kg) shell to a range of 11,630 yards (10,630 m). A single 1 1/2-pounder (37 mm (1.5 in)) "pom-pom" AA gun was fitted, although this was later replaced by a 2-pounder (40 mm (1.6 in)) gun. Four single 21 inch (533 mm) torpedo-tubes were mounted singly on the ship's sides.

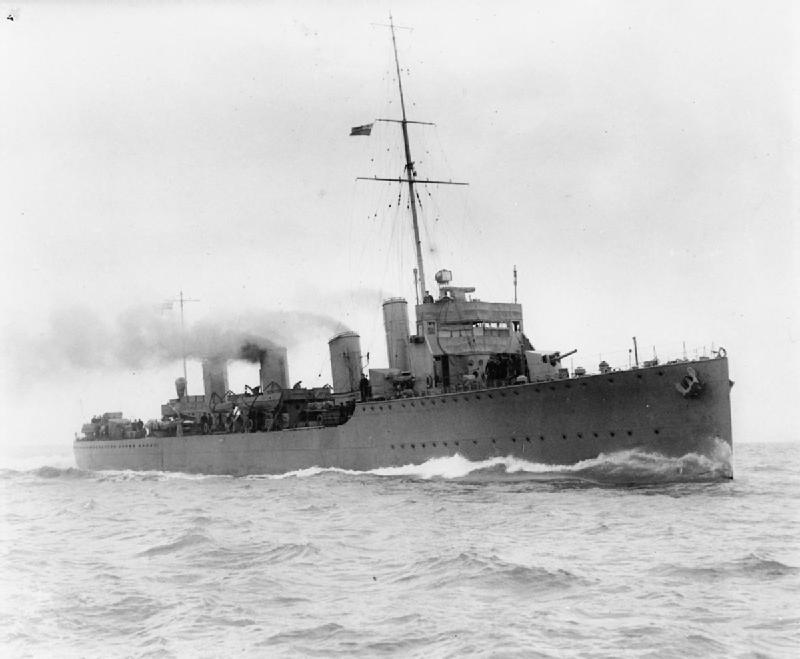
Sister ship HMS Botha, after being rearmed

In 1918, she was rearmed based on the experience of Dover Patrol operations, with the side-by-side 4-inch guns mounted fore-and-aft removed and replaced by two single 45-calibre BL 4.7 inch (120 mm) guns. These could fire a 50-pound (23 kg) shell to 15,800 yards (14,400 m).

== Service ==
=== Royal Navy ===
Faulknor took part in a sweep by the cruiser Fearless and 10 destroyers off the mouth of the River Ems on 25 October 1914 which acted as a diversion for a planned raid by aircraft from the seaplane carriers Engadine and Riviera, escorted by the Harwich Force, on the German airship base near Cuxhaven. Poor weather led to the abandonment of the operation, however, with four of the six aircraft unable to take off. On 5–7 November and 9–11 November Faulknor took part in patrols off the Dutch coast with the Harwich Force. In November 1914, Faulknor was recorded as part of the 1st Destroyer Flotilla of the Grand Fleet. Early in February 1915, Faulknor took part in anti-submarine sweeps in the Irish Sea as a response to operations by U-21 which sank three small steamers on 30 January, and then in escorting the ships carrying the 1st Canadian Division from Avonmouth to St Nazaire. By March 1915, Faulknor had transferred to the 4th Destroyer Flotilla. On 12 March 1915, Faulknor and six destroyers were detached from the Grand Fleet for anti-submarine operations in the Irish Sea where the German submarines U-20 and U-27 were active, disrupting the operations of the Northern Patrol, but they were recalled on 15 March as a result of increased submarine activity off Rosyth. On 1 July 1915, U-25 attempted to torpedo the cruiser Hampshire off Noss Head near Wick, Caithness. Faulknor led an unsuccessful search by twelve destroyers together with several trawlers for the German submarine.

Faulknor was still part of the 4th Flotilla in March 1916, but by 24 April 1916 was leader of the 12th Destroyer Flotilla of the Grand Fleet based at Scapa Flow. Faulknor was still leader of the 12th Destroyer Flotilla at the Battle of Jutland on 31 May – 1 June 1916, operating in support of the Grand Fleet. From about 19:15 hr Greenwich Mean Time (GMT), the Germans launched a series of torpedo-boat attacks against the British battle line, and the 12th Flotilla got into a brief exchange of fire with German torpedo boats of the 3rd Torpedo-Boat Flotilla. Faulknor then fired on the German torpedo boat V48, which had been disabled in an earlier action with Shark, and ordered four destroyers of her flotilla (Obedient, Mindful, Marvel and Onslaught) to finish off V48, with the German destroyer being sunk by gunfire from the four British ships. At about 01:43 hr GMT on 1 June, Faulknor spotted a group of German battleships and manoeuvred to set up a torpedo attack by her flotilla. Faulknor fired two torpedoes at the German battle line, and while she claimed a single hit, both torpedoes missed although one narrowly missed the German battleship Grosser Kurfürst. One torpedo from Onslaught sank the predreadnought battleship Pommern.

On 2 November 1916, the German submarine U-30 suffered double engine failure 25 miles (40 km) west of Bergen, Norway, with U-20 responding to U-30' s distress signals and taking the stricken submarine under tow. U-30's radio signals were also picked up by the British who despatched three formations of warships to intercept the two submarines. Faulknor set off from Cromarty with six destroyers of the 12th Flotilla on 3 November, but was recalled later that day when the British intercepted signals indicating that U-30 had got her engines working again. Both submarines ran aground off Denmark on 4 November, and while U-30 managed to free herself, U-20 could not and was scuttled on 5 November.

The Dover Patrol, protecting the Dover Barrage and shipping in the English Channel from German attack, had a shortage of modern destroyers, and as a result it was decided to transfer Faulknor and sister ship Broke as reinforcements. Faulknor transferred to the Dover Patrol on 31 December 1916, joining the 6th Destroyer Flotilla. On the night of 25/26 February 1917, Faulknor was one of ten destroyers (Note: Faulknor, Broke, Viking, Lapwing, Laertes, Lawford, Lark, Llewellyn, Laforey, Lucifer and Liberty.) being held in reserve at Dover in case of German attack, with two light cruisers and four destroyers anchored off Deal in the Downs and five destroyers patrolling the Straits of Dover. German torpedo boats launched a raid on the Dover Barrage and shipping in the Channel that night. The raid was ineffective, with a clash between the patrolling destroyer Laverock causing one group of German torpedo boats to turn back, while a second group of German torpedo boats shelled Margate and Westgate-on-Sea, destroying a house and killing a woman and two children. The stand-by destroyers, including Faulknor, were ordered to form a patrol line in the channel in response, but saw nothing. On the night of 17/18 March 1917, German torpedo boats attacked targets in the Channel again, with two groups (one of seven torpedo boats and one of five torpedo boats) attacking the Dover barrage, while four more torpedo boats (the 2nd Zeebrugge Half Flotilla) attacked the Downs. This time, Faulknor was part of the force defending the Downs. (Note: The force on the Downs consisted of the light cruiser Canterbury, Faulknor and the destroyers Viking, Saracen, Mentor and Ambuscade.) The northern German force torpedoed and sank a merchant ship (SS Greypoint) anchored outside the entrance to the Downs, and then shelled Ramsgate and Broadstairs before withdrawing. They were spotted by the British torpedo boat TB 4 which signalled for help, summoning the naval force protecting the Downs, including Faulknor, but the German force managed to escape without being engaged. The attack against the barrage resulted in the destroyer Paragon being torpedoed and sunk, with the destroyer Llewellyn being badly damaged by a torpedo when attempting to search for survivors from Paragon.

On 12 May 1917, the monitors Erebus, Terror, Marshal Soult, Sir John Moore, M24 and M26 bombarded the German-held Belgian port of Zeebrugge, with Faulknor part of the escort force for the operation. The bombardment was intended to destroy the locks on the Boudewijn Canal between Zeebrugge and Bruges in order to cut off Zeebrugge from inland ports. While the railway line from Zeebrugge was hit, the locks were undamaged. On 2 June 1917, Erebus and Terror bombarded Ostend, with Faulknor again part of the escort for the monitors. The bombardment sank the submarine UC-70 (Note: UC-70 was later salvaged and returned to service.) and two barges, while damaging another submarine and three torpedo boats, although the all-important lock gates survived. On 25 July 1917, ships of the Dover Patrol, supported by the Harwich Force, laid a mine-net barrage off the Belgian coast between Nieuport and Zeebrugge. A group of six British destroyers led by Faulknor exchanged long range gunfire with four German torpedo boats during the operation. On 25 September 1917, Faulknor and the destroyer Nugent were damaged by British mines in the mine net barrage across the Dover straits.

On 22 April 1918, the British launched attacks against Zeebrugge and Ostend, with the intention of blocking the entrances to the canals linking these ports with Bruges and thus stopping U-boat operations from the Flanders ports. Faulknor formed part of the supporting force, acting as the flagship of Commodore Hubert Lynes, commanding the Ostend operation, patrolling off Ostend and supporting the small craft taking part in the operation. While the Zeebrugge operation partially blocked the canal locks, that at Ostend was a failure, and it was decided to repeat the Ostend operation as soon as practicable. The operation was repeated on the night of 9/10 May 1918, with Faulknor again serving as Roger Keyes' flagship. The operation was a failure, with the blockship Vindictive failing to block the main shipping channel.

Faulknor remained part of the Dover patrol at the end of the war, although listed as under repair.

=== Chile ===
Faulknor, along with sister ships Broke and Botha, were sold back to Chile in April–May 1920, with Faulknor being renamed Almirante Riveros. (Note: The name Almirante Riveros was previously allocated to the destroyer that served as Tipperary in Royal Navy service, which was sunk at the Battle of Jutland.) The three ex-Royal Navy ships had been considerably changed during their service during the First World War, and were therefore treated as a separate class (the Almirante Williams class) to the two destroyers that were delivered to Chile before the outbreak of the war. Almirante Riveros took part in the Chilean naval mutiny of 1931 and was hit several times by shells when the Chilean Army attacked the naval base of Talcahuano. One of the destroyer's boilers exploded, and she retreated to Quiriquina Island. Five of Almirante Riveros's crew were killed. Almirante Riveros was stricken in 1933, and was sunk as a target by the battleship Almirante Latorre on 10 April 1939.

== Bibliography ==
- Bacon, Reginald (1919). The Dover Patrol 1915–1917. Vol. II. Hutchinson & Son.
- Battle of Jutland, 30th May to 1st June 1916: Official Despatches with Appendices. His Majesty's Stationery Office. 1920.
- Campbell, John (1998). Jutland: An Analysis of the Fighting. Conway Maritime Press. ISBN 0-85177-750-3.
- Corbett, Julian S. (1921). Naval Operations: Volume II. History of the Great War. Longmans, Green & Co.
- Fock, Harald (1989). Z-Vor!: Internationale Entwicklung und Kriegseinsätze von Zerstörern und Torpedobooten: 1914 bis 1939 (in German). Koelers Verlagsgesellschaft mbH. ISBN 3-7822-0207-4.
- Friedman, Norman (2009). British Destroyers: From Earliest Days to the First World War. Seaforth Publishing. ISBN 978-1-84832-049-9.
- Friedman, Norman (2011). Naval Weapons of World War One: Guns, Torpedoes, Mines and ASW Weapons of All Nations: An Illustrated Directory. Barnsley, UK: Seaforth Publishing. ISBN 978-1-84832-100-7.
- Goldrick, James (2018). After Jutland: The Naval War in Northern European Waters June 1916–November 1918. Seaforth Publishing. ISBN 978-1-5267-4298-8.
- Jellicoe, John (1919). The Grand Fleet 1914–1916: Its Creation, Development and Work. London: Cassell and Company.
- Karau, Mark D. (2014). The Naval Flank of the Western Front: The German MarineKorps Flandern 1914–1918. Seaforth Publishing. ISBN 978-1-84832-231-8.
- Manning, T. D.; Walker, C. F. (1959). British Warship Names. Putnam.
- Monograph No. 18: The Dover Command: Vol. I (PDF). Naval Staff Monographs (Historical). Vol. VI. The Naval Staff, Training and Staff Duties Division. 1922.
- Monograph No. 24: Home Waters—Part II: September and October 1914 (PDF). Naval Staff Monographs (Historical). Vol. XI. The Naval Staff, Training and Staff Duties Division. 1924.
- Monograph No. 28: Home Waters—Part III: From November 1914 to the end of January 1915 (PDF). Naval Staff Monographs (Historical). Vol. XII. The Naval Staff, Training and Staff Duties Division. 1925.
- Monograph No. 29: Home Waters—Part IV: From February to July 1915 (PDF). Naval Staff Monographs (Historical). Vol. XIII. The Naval Staff, Training and Staff Duties Division. 1925.
- Monograph No. 30: Home Waters—Part V: From July to October 1915 (PDF). Naval Staff Monographs (Historical). Vol. XIV. The Naval Staff, Training and Staff Duties Division. 1926.
- Monograph No. 32: Lowestoft Raid: 24th–25th April 1916 (PDF). Naval Staff Monographs (Historical). Vol. XVI. The Naval Staff, Training and Staff Duties Division. 1927.
- Monograph No. 33: Home Waters—Part VII: From June 1916 to November 1916 (PDF). Naval Staff Monographs (Historical). Vol. XVII. The Naval Staff, Training and Staff Duties Division. 1927.
- Monograph No. 34: Home Waters—Part VIII: December 1916 to April 1917 (PDF). Naval Staff Monographs (Historical). Vol. XVIII. The Naval Staff, Training and Staff Duties Division. 1933.
- Monograph No. 35: Home Waters—Part IX: 1st May, 1917 to 31st July, 1917 (PDF). Naval Staff Monographs (Historical). Vol. XIX. The Naval Staff, Training and Staff Duties Division. 1939.
- Newbolt, Henry (1928). Naval Operations: Vol IV. History of the Great War. Longmans, Green and Co.
- Newbolt, Henry (1931). Naval Operations: Vol V. History of the Great War. Longmans, Green and Co.
- Preston, Antony (1985). "Great Britain and Empire Forces". In Gray, Randal (ed.). Conway's All the World's Fighting Ships 1906–1921. Naval Institute Press. pp. 1–104. ISBN 0-85177-245-5.
- Terry, C. Sanford, ed. (1919). Ostend and Zeebrugge: April 23:May 10 1918: The Dispatches of Vice-Admiral Roger Keyes K.C.B, K.V.C.O and other Narratives of the Operations. Oxford University Press.
- Vergara Paredes, Sandrino (2019). "Mitología sobre la batalla de Talcahuano y la sublevación de la marinería de 1931" (PDF) (in Spanish). Academia de Historia Militar.
