= SMS G85 =

Torpedo boat of the Imperial German Navy

History

German Empire
- Name: G85
- Ordered: 1914 Mobilization (Mob) order
- Builder: Germaniawerft, Kiel, Germany
- Launched: 24 July 1915
- Commissioned: 14 December 1915
- Fate: Sunk by HMS Swift during the Battle of Dover Strait, 21 April 1917

General characteristics
- Class & type: V25-class torpedo boat
- Displacement: 1,051 tonnes
- Length: 83.5 m (274 ft)
- Beam: 8.33 m (27.3 ft)
- Draught: 3.74 m (12.3 ft) (fwd); 3.45 m (11.3 ft) (aft)
- Speed: 34.5 knots (63.9 km/h; 39.7 mph)
- Range: 1,100 nautical miles (2,000 km; 1,300 mi) at 20 knots (37 km/h; 23 mph)
- Complement: 83 officers and sailors
- Armament: 3 × 4.1 in (105 mm) guns; 6 × 500 mm torpedo tubes; 24 mines

SMS G85 (Note: "SMS" stands for German: Seiner Majestät Schiff, lit. 'His Majesty's Ship') (Note: The "G" in G85 denoted the shipbuilder who constructed her, i.e. Germaniawerft.) was a 1913 Type Large Torpedo Boat (Großes Torpedoboot) of the Imperial German Navy (Kaiserliche Marine) during World War I. G85 was built by Germaniawerft at their Kiel shipyard, with the ship being launched on 24 July 1915 and completed in December that year.

G85 served with the German High Seas Fleet, operating in the North Sea and the English Channel. She was sunk in the Battle of Dover Strait on 21 April 1917, after being torpedoed by the British Flotilla leader Swift.

== Construction and design ==
On 6 August 1914, as a result of the outbreak of the First World War, the Imperial German Navy placed orders for 48 high-seas torpedo-boats, with 12, including G85, to be built by Germaniawerft, part of the 1914 mobilisation order. (Note: The last of these ships, G96, was completed as the first of the 1916 Mobilisation Type.) These ships were based on the last torpedo boats ordered before the outbreak of war, the V25-class. G85 was laid down at Germaniawerft's Kiel shipyard as yard number 221, and was launched on 24 July 1915. The ship was commissioned on 14 December 1915.

G85 was 83.0 m (272 ft 4 in) long overall and 82.2 m (269 ft 8 in) at the waterline, with a beam of 8.36 m (27 ft 5 in) and a draught of 3.5 m (11 ft 6 in). The ship displaced 960 tonnes (940 long tons) design and 1,147 tonnes (1,129 long tons) deep load. Three oil-fired water-tube boilers fed steam at 18 standard atmospheres (260 psi) to two sets of Germania direct-drive steam turbines, each of which drove a single propeller shaft with a 2.50 m (8 ft 2 in) diameter, three-bladed propeller fitted. The machinery was rated at 24,000 PS (24,000 shp; 18,000 kW), giving a design speed of 33.5 kn (38.6 mph; 62.0 km/h). 326 t of oil was carried, giving a range of 1,760 nmi (2,030 mi; 3,260 km) at 20 kn (23 mph; 37 km/h).

The ship was armed with three 8.8 cm SK L/45 naval guns (Note: SK stood for Schnellfeuerkanone (quick-firing gun) or Schnellade-Kanone (fast-loading gun).) (Note: In Imperial German Navy gun nomenclature, the L/45 denotes the length of the gun. In this case, the L/45 gun is 45 caliber, meaning that the gun has an overall length 45 times greater than the gun's bore.) in single mounts, together with six 50 cm (19.7 in) torpedo tubes with two fixed single tubes forward and 2 twin mounts aft. Up to 24 mines could be carried. In the second half of 1916, the 8.8 cm guns were replaced by three 10.5 cm (4.1 in) SK L/45 guns. The ship had a complement of 85 officers and men.

== Service ==
On 10–11 February 1916, 25 torpedo boats of the 2nd, 6th and 9th Torpedo Boat Flotillas carried out a sortie to the Dogger Bank in the North Sea. G85, part of the 3rd Torpedo Boat Flotilla, and the torpedo boat G42 escorted the light cruiser Pillau as the cruiser provided cover for the operation, operating 20 nmi (23 mi; 37 km) behind the search line. The operation resulted in the Battle of Dogger Bank, where four British sloops were mistaken for cruisers and attacked, with the sloop HMS Arabis torpedoed and sunk. On 25 March 1916, the British seaplane carrier HMS Vindex, escorted by the cruisers and destroyers of the Harwich Force, launched an air attack against a Zeppelin base believed to be at Hoyer on the coast of Schleswig. The raid was a failure, with the airship base actually at Tondern. The British destroyer HMS Medusa was badly damaged by a collision with the destroyer Laverock and was later abandoned. German cruisers and torpedo boats were ordered to search for the withdrawing British force, with G85 one of five torpedo boats (S18, S22, V29, G42 and G85) that accompanied the light cruiser Rostock. S22 struck a mine about 35 nmi (40 mi; 65 km) west of the Borkum Riff Lightship, with the explosion sinking the torpedo boat.

G85 was part of the 5th half-flotilla of the 3rd Torpedo Boat Flotilla in April 1916. G85 was under repair at Kiel dockyard on 31 May 1916, and so did not take part in the Battle of Jutland. On 18 August 1916, the High Seas Fleet sailed on a sortie to bombard Sunderland in order to draw out units of the British Fleet and destroy them. G85 formed part of the 3rd Torpedo Boat Flotilla, but no general fleet engagement took place, despite both the High Seas Fleet and the British Grand Fleet being at sea at the same time.

On 23 October 1916, the 3rd Torpedo Boat Flotilla (including G85) and the 9th Torpedo Boat Flotilla, a total of 20 torpedo boats, left Germany for Flanders in Belgium in order to reinforce the German naval forces based there, with the objective of disrupting the Dover Patrol and attack allied shipping in the English Channel, arriving on 24 October. On the night of 26/27 October 1916, 24 torpedo boats of the 3rd and 9th Flotillas and the 'Z' half-flotilla, carried out an attack on the drifters of the Dover Barrage and shipping in the Channel, but G85 did not take part in this attack. On 3 November 1916, the 3rd Flotilla returned to Germany and rejoined the High Seas Fleet.

The 3rd Torpedo Boat Flotilla, including G85 (still a member of the 5th half-flotilla), returned to Flanders on 24 March 1917, and unlike the previous deployment, the flotilla was assigned permanently to Flanders. The 3rd Flotilla carried out sorties to the Southern Bight on the nights of 29/30 March, 30/31 March, 6/7 April, 10 April and 18 April, but had no success. On the night of 20/21 April 1917, the Flanders-based torpedo boats launched another large-scale attack into the Channel, with 15 torpedo boats deployed in three groups. One, Gruppe Gautier, consisting of G42, G85, S53, V71, V73 and V81 was to attack the Dover Barrage and attack Dover, while the second, Gruppe Albrecht, also consisting of six torpedo boats, was to attack the Barrage and Calais, while the third force of three torpedo boats, Gruppe Zander, was tasked with attacking shipping in The Downs. At about 23:30 hr on 20 April Gruppe Gautier encountered the trawler Sabreur and attacked with gunfire, scoring two hits. While the Germans believed that they had sunk the trawler, Sabreur managed to escape with only minor damage. Gruppe Gautier then shelled Dover and was fired on in response by British coastal artillery. Gruppe Gautier, now split into two sub-divisions of three ships each, moved off down the Channel to attack the Dover Barrage, but encountered the British Flotilla Leaders Broke and Swift. The two British ships clashed with the first subdivision, with an exchange of torpedoes and shellfire resulting in a single shell hitting Swift before contact was lost. They then encountered the second group. Swift torpedoed G85, bringing the torpedo boat to a halt and setting her on fire, while Broke rammed G42. After drawing away from G42, the damaged Broke approached G85 and opened fire on her. Both G85 and G42 sank, with 35 of G85's crew killed.

== Bibliography ==
- Campbell, John (1998). Jutland: An Analysis of the Fighting. London: Conway Maritime Press. ISBN 0-85177-750-3.
- Fock, Harald (1989). Z-Vor! Internationale Entwicklung und Kriegseinsätze von Zerstörern und Torpedobooten 1914 bis 1939 (in German). Herford, Germany: Koehlers Verlagsgesellschaft mBH. ISBN 3-7822-0207-4.
- Friedman, Norman (2011). Naval Weapons of World War One: Guns, Torpedoes, Mines and ASW Weapons of All Nations: An Illustrated Directory. Barnsley, UK: Seaforth Publishing. ISBN 978-1-84832-100-7.
- Gardiner, Robert; Gray, Randal, eds. (1985). Conway's All The World's Fighting Ships 1906–1921. London: Conway Maritime Press. ISBN 0-85177-245-5.
- Gröner, Erich; Jung, Dieter; Maass, Martin (1983). Die deutschen Kriegsschiffe 1815–1945: Band 2: Torpedoboote, Zerstörer, Schnellboote, Minensuchboote, Minenräumboote (in German). Koblenz: Bernard & Graef Verlag. ISBN 3-7637-4801-6.
- Gröner, Erich; Jung, Dieter; Maass, Martin (1990). German Warships 1915–1945: Volume One: Major Surface Vessels. Annapolis, Maryland, US: Naval Institute Press. ISBN 0-87021-790-9.
- Groos, O. (1925). Der krieg in der Nordsee: Fünfter Band: Von Januar bis Juni 1916. Der Krieg zur See 1914–1918 (in German). Berlin: Verlag von E. S. Mittler und Sohn.
- Halpern, Paul G. (1994). A Naval History of World War I. London: UCL Press. ISBN 1-85728-498-4.
- Karau, Mark K. (2014). The Naval Flank of the Western Front: The German MarineKorps Flandern 1914–1918. Barnsley, UK: Seaforth Publishing. ISBN 978-1-84832-231-8.
- Massie, Robert K. (2007). Castles of Steel: Britain, Germany and the Winning of the Great War at Sea. London: Vintage Books. ISBN 978-0-099-52378-9.
- Monograph No. 31: Home Waters—Part VI.: From October 1915 to May 1916 (PDF). Naval Staff Monographs (Historical). Vol. XV. Naval Staff, Training and Staff Duties Division. 1926.
- Monograph No. 33: Home Waters—Part VII.: From June 1916 to November 1916 (PDF). Naval Staff Monographs (Historical). Vol. XVII. The Naval Staff, Training and Staff Duties Division. 1927.
- Monograph No. 34: Home Waters—Part VIII: December 1916 to April 1917. Naval Staff Monographs (Historical). Vol. XVIII. The Naval Staff, Training and Staff Duties Division. 1933. part 1 (pp. 1–121), part 2 (pp. 122–265), part 3 (pp. 266–404) and part 4 (pp. 406–532).
