= Almirante Lynch-class destroyer =

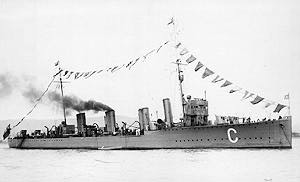
- Almirante Condell

Class overview
- Name: Almirante Lynch class
- Builders: J. Samuel White, United Kingdom
- Operators: Chilean Navy; Royal Navy
- Succeeded by: Serrano class
- Built: 1911–1915
- In commission: 1913–1945
- Planned: 6
- Completed: 6
- Lost: 1

General characteristics
- Type: Destroyer
- Displacement: 1,430 long tons (1,453 t) standard; 1,850 long tons (1,880 t) full load
- Length: 101 m (331 ft 4 in)
- Beam: 9.9 m (32 ft 6 in)
- Draught: 3.35 m (11 ft 0 in)
- Propulsion: 6× White-Forster boilers; 3 shaft Parsons direct turbines; 30,000 hp (22,371 kW)
- Speed: 31 knots (57 km/h; 36 mph)
- Range: 4,205 nautical miles (7,788 km; 4,839 mi) at 15 knots (28 km/h; 17 mph)
- Complement: 160 (197 in ex-British ships)
- Armament: As built; 6 × single 4 in (102 mm) guns; 2 × twin tubes for 21 in (533 mm) torpedoes (4 × single in Botha); As rearmed; 2 × single 4.7 in (120 mm) guns; 2 × single 4 in (102 mm) guns; 2 × single 2 pdr 40 mm (1.6 in) AA guns; 2 × twin tubes for 21 in torpedoes

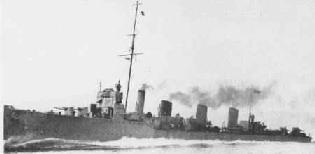
Broke

The Almirante Lynch class were a group of destroyers built for the Chilean Navy prior to World War I. The class was named after Admiral Patricio Lynch, Chilean sailor, hero of the War of the Pacific. Initially six ships were planned, two being delivered (Almirante Lynch and Almirante Condell). The other four were purchased by and incorporated into the Royal Navy during World War I as the Faulknor-class flotilla leader. In common with Royal Navy convention, they were named after famous Royal Navy captains of the past, in this case the members of the Faulknor family. One of the four ships taken over by the Royal Navy was sunk in 1916, but the other three were returned to the friendly nation of Chile in 1920, at which point the Thornycroft type leader Rooke was renamed Broke to maintain this famous name (that of Admiral Sir Philip Bowes Vere Broke of the Shannon) in the Navy List. These three surviving ships were returned to the Chilean Navy and renamed the Almirante Williams class, after Juan Williams Rebolledo the Chilean Navy commander-in-chief during the War of the Pacific.

== Design ==
The Chileans had long been customers of British shipyards and ordered six ships from J. Samuel White in 1911. These destroyers were a private design by J. Samuel White that were significantly larger and heavier armed than their contemporary British destroyers. They had four funnels, a tall, narrow fore funnel and three broad, short funnels behind.

Construction of these ships led to an expansion of the yard and the purchase of a large 80 ton hammerhead crane from Babcock & Wilcox of Renfrew, Scotland. They were initially armed with six single QF 4 inch guns, unusually arranged with four on the forecastle - two sided in front of the wheelhouse and two sided abreast it - the remaining pair being sided on the quarterdeck. These guns were of a novel Elswick design for the Chileans and when the ships were rearmed they were replaced with standard Royal Navy models. As rearmed in 1918 they carried a BL 4.7 inch gun on the forecastle and another on a bandstand between the after pair of funnels, retained the pair of 4 inch guns abreast the wheelhouse and had two QF 2 pounder pom-poms.

Compared to other Royal Navy ships, the class was noted for the lavish officer's accommodations ordered by the Chileans. This included silver-plated chandeliers in the captain's quarters.

== Service history ==
Only two ships were delivered before the outbreak of war and served in the Chilean Navy until 1945. The remaining four ships were purchased by the British in 1914 and fought in the Royal Navy during World War I as the Faulknor-class flotilla leaders. All of the class were present at the Battle of Jutland on 31 May to 1 June 1916 where Broke collided with and sank the Acasta-class destroyer Sparrowhawk. Also in this action, Tipperary, serving with the 4th Destroyer Flotilla, was hit by 5.9-inch (150 mm) fire from the secondary battery of the German dreadnought Westfalen and sank with the loss of 185 hands from her crew of 197.

In April 1917, Broke took part in an action known as the Battle of Dover Strait with equally large singleton Swift during which she was damaged.

Botha was damaged in the English Channel on 21 March 1918 off the coast of Flanders when she rammed and sank the German torpedo boat A-19 and was then torpedoed in error by the French destroyer Capitaine Mehl.

The three surviving ships were returned to the friendly nation of Chile in 1920, and formed the Almirante Williams class - taking their name from the original name of HMS Botha - but being worn out were scrapped in 1933.

== Ships ==
Almirante Lynch class
Name	Ship Builder	Launched	Completed	Fate
Almirante Lynch	J S White, Cowes	28 September 1912	1913	Decommissioned 1945
Almirante Condell	J S White, Cowes	27 January 1913	January 1914	Decommissioned 1945

Faulknor class
Name	Ship Builder	Launched	Completed	Fate
Faulknor (ex-Almirante Simpson)	J S White, Cowes	26 February 1914	Completed 1914	Returned to Chile 1920
Broke (ex-Almirante Goñi)	J S White, Cowes	25 May 1914	1914	Returned to Chile 1920
Botha (ex-Almirante Williams Rebolledo)	J S White, Cowes	2 December 1914	1915	Returned to Chile 1920
Tipperary (ex-Almirante Riveros)	J S White, Cowes	5 March 1915	1915	Sunk by gunfire at Battle of Jutland, 31 May 1916

Almirante Williams class
Ship	Launched	Commissioned	Fate
Almirante Riveros, (ex-HMS Faulknor), ex-Almirante Simpson	26 February 1914	late 1914	Returned to Chile 1920, Scrapped 1933
Almirante Uribe, (ex-HMS Broke), ex-Almirante Goni	25 May 1914	Late 1914	Returned to Chile 1920, Scrapped 1933
Almirante Williams, (ex-HMS Botha)	2 December 1914	1915	Returned to Chile 1920, Scrapped 1933

== General characteristics ==
=== Armament ===
- 6 × 4 in (102 mm) guns (ex British ships had 2 × 4.7 in (120 mm) and 2 × 4 inch guns)
- 4 × machine guns (2 × pom-poms in ex-British ships)
- 6 × 21 in (530 mm) torpedo tubes (4 in ex-British ships)

== Bibliography ==
- Colledge, J. J.; Warlow, Ben & Bush, Steve (2020). Ships of the Royal Navy: The Complete Record of all Fighting Ships of the Royal Navy from the 15th Century to the Present (5th revised and updated ed.). Seaforth Publishing. ISBN 978-1-5267-9327-0.
- Dunn, Steve R. (2017). Securing the Narrow Sea: The Dover Patrol 1914–1918. Seaforth Publishing. ISBN 978-1-84832-249-3.
- Friedman, Norman (2009). British Destroyers From Earliest Days to the Second World War. Naval Institute Press. ISBN 978-1-59114-081-8.
- Gardiner, Robert & Gray, Randal, eds. (1985). Conway's All The World's Fighting Ships 1906–1921. London: Conway Maritime Press. ISBN 0-85177-245-5.
- Halpern, Paul G. (1994). Naval History of World War I (2nd hardcover printing; 1st paperback printing ed.). London: U. C. L. P. ISBN 1-85728-295-7.
- March, Edgar J. (1966). British Destroyers: A History of Development, 1892–1953; Drawn by Admiralty Permission From Official Records & Returns, Ships' Covers & Building Plans. Seeley Service. OCLC 164893555.
- Preston, Antony (1985). "Great Britain and Empire Forces". In Gray, Randal (ed.). Conway's All the World's Fighting Ships 1906–1921. Naval Institute Press. pp. 1–104. ISBN 0-85177-245-5.
- Whitley, M. J. (1988). Destroyers of World War 2. Cassell Publishing. ISBN 1-85409-521-8.
