= HMS Broke (1914) =

Destroyer of the Royal Navy

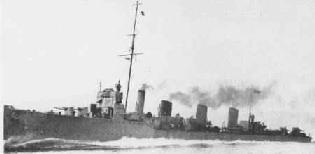

History

United Kingdom
- Name: Broke
- Builder: J. Samuel White, East Cowes
- Launched: 25 May 1914
- Completed: November 1914
- Acquired: August 1914
- Fate: Resold to Chilean Navy, May 1920

Chile
- Name: Almirante Uribe
- Commissioned: 1920
- Decommissioned: 1933
- Fate: Scrapped, 1933

General characteristics
- Class & type: Faulknor-class destroyer leader
- Displacement: 1,742 long tons (1,770 t)
- Length: 331 ft 3 in (100.97 m) (o/a)
- Beam: 32 ft 6 in (9.9 m)
- Draught: 11 ft 8 in (3.6 m) (deep load)
- Installed power: 6 × White-Forster boilers; 30,000 shp (22,000 kW)
- Propulsion: 3 shafts; 3 steam turbines
- Speed: 30 knots (56 km/h; 35 mph)
- Range: 2,405 nmi (4,454 km; 2,768 mi) at 15 knots (28 km/h; 17 mph)
- Complement: 197
- Armament: As built; 6 × single 4 in (102 mm) guns; 4 × single tubes for 21 in (533 mm) torpedoes; As rearmed; 2 × single 4.7 in (120 mm) guns; 2 × single 4 in guns; 2 × single 2 pdr 40 mm (1.6 in) AA gun; 2 × twin tubes for 21 in torpedoes

HMS Broke was a Faulknor-class destroyer leader of the Royal Navy, initially built for the Chilean Navy as the Almirante Lynch-class destroyer Almirante Goñi. The outbreak of the First World War led to her being purchased by the Admiralty in August 1914 shortly after her launching, and renamed HMS Broke. All of the class were present at the Battle of Jutland on 31 May to 1 June 1916, where Broke, out of control after hits from German ships, collided with the Acasta-class destroyer HMS Sparrowhawk, leading to the latter's loss. Broke saw action in several battles, and was resold to Chile after the conclusion of the war.

== Design and description ==
The Almirante Lynch-class ships were ordered by Chile in 1912 to counter four destroyers ordered by Argentina from France. Two of these ships had been delivered before the war began and the British purchased the other four; the two that were almost complete were bought in August and the pair which had not yet been launched the following month. The first pair to enter service had minimal alterations to suit the RN, but the latter two were more heavily modified.

The ships were the second-largest destroyers in the world, after HMS Swift, and served in the RN as the Faulknor-class flotilla leaders. The Faulknors had a length between perpendiculars of 320 feet (97.5 m), an overall length of 331 feet 3 inches (100.97 m), a beam of 32 feet 6 inches (9.9 m) and a draught of 11 feet 8 inches (3.6 m) at deep load. They displaced 1,742 long tons (1,770 t) at normal load and 1,985 long tons (2,017 t) at deep load. The crew of Broke and her sister ship Faulknor consisted of 197 officers and ratings.

The Faulknor class were powered by three Parsons direct-drive steam turbines, each driving one propeller shaft using steam provided by six mixed-firing White-Forster boilers. The turbines developed a total of 30,000 shaft horsepower (22,000 kW) and gave a maximum speed of around 30 knots (56 km/h; 35 mph). The ships carried 433 long tons (440 t) of coal and 83 long tons (84 t) of fuel oil that gave them a range of 4,205 nautical miles (7,788 km; 4,839 mi) at 15 knots (28 km/h; 17 mph).

The main armament of the Faulknor class consisted of six quick-firing (QF) four-inch (102 mm) Mk VI guns on pivot mounts with large gun shields. The arrangement of the guns and torpedo tubes on Broke and Faulknor differed from their half-sisters Botha and Tipperary in that the former had the guns grouped side-by-side on the forecastle and quarterdeck while the other two were on each side of the forward superstructure, one gun on each broadside. They were also fitted with four torpedo tubes in four rotating single-tube mounts for 21-inch (533 mm) torpedoes, two mounts on each broadside. The sisters were later fitted with a pair of QF two-pounder (40 mm (1.6 in)) Mk I anti-aircraft guns on single mounts on separate platforms between the rearmost and middle funnels.

== Construction and career ==
Built as the Almirante Goni by J. Samuel White, East Cowes, HMS Broke was launched on 25 May 1914, and was completed in 1914. She was named for Rear Admiral Sir Philip Broke, Bt. who while in command of HMS Shannon was responsible for the capture of USS Chesapeake in 1813.

=== Battle of Jutland ===
Broke formed part of the 4th Destroyer Flotilla commanded by Captain Charles Wintour on board Tipperary. During the night of 31 May the flotilla was stationed behind (north) of the Grand Fleet to guard against German attack and was heading south keeping station with the fleet. At around 23:15 Leading Torpedoman Cox on board HMS Garland, fourth ship in the twelve-strong line, sighted three ships approaching. These were reported to Captain Wintour, who being unable to determine whether the ships were British or German issued a British challenge signal to the approaching ships. This was immediately answered by a hail of fire at a range of around 600 yards from the approaching German light cruisers, SMS Stuttgart, SMS Hamburg, SMS Rostock and SMS Elbing. Shortly behind them, the battleships SMS Westfalen and SMS Nassau also opened fire with their secondary armament. The ships were the van of the German High Seas Fleet, which was passing behind the British fleet.

The leading British ships, Tipperary, HMS Spitfire, Sparrowhawk, HMS Garland, HMS Contest and Broke all fired torpedoes at the German ships before turning away from the fire. Confusion as to the identity of the opposing ships persisted despite the outbreak of gunfire, so that Broke's captain ordered no torpedoes to be fired until he could positively identify the ships as German. This he did when a searchlight from one of the German ships caught one of her companions for long enough for it to be identified. None of the destroyers further behind felt sufficiently confident to open fire. In accord with standing orders to conserve torpedo stocks, each ship fired only one or two torpedoes, one of which struck Elbing, but in the dark it was unknown which ship had fired it. The German ships had turned away to avoid the torpedoes, and in the confusion Elbing was rammed by the battleship SMS Posen. Tipperary was set on fire in the engagement and sank around 02:00 the following morning. Elbing had to be abandoned and similarly sank around 03:40. Spitfire narrowly avoided being rammed by the battleship Nassau, ripping a hole in the side of the battleship as the two ships collided side to side, but then had to retire from the battle and limped home to England.

The remaining ships of the 4th Destroyer Flotilla formed up behind Commander Walter Allen of Broke, who was the half-flotilla leader and now assumed command. At around 23:40 large ships were again sighted and Allen attempted to challenge. Before he could do so, the German battleship Westfalen sent her own recognition signal and then turned on searchlights. Broke attempted to fire torpedoes, but the range was very short, in the region of 150 yards (140 m), and the German ship opened fire first. The effect was devastating so that within a couple of minutes 50 crew were killed and another 30 injured, disabling the guns and preventing any effective activity on deck. The helmsman was killed at the wheel, and as he died his body turned the wheel, causing the ship to turn to port and ram Sparrowhawk. Both ships had already turned to port from line ahead to line abreast to fire torpedoes.

Sub Lieutenant Percy Wood saw Broke coming towards them at 28 knots, heading directly for Sparrowhawk's bridge. He shouted warnings to crew on the foc'sle to get clear, and then was knocked over by the impact. He awoke to find himself lying on the deck of Broke. Wood reported to Commander Allen, who told him to return to his own ship and make preparations there to take on board the crew of Broke. Two other men from Sparrowhawk were also thrown onto Broke by the collision. Returning to Sparrowhawk, Wood was told by his own captain, Lieutenant Commander Sydney Hopkins, that he had just sent exactly the same message across to Broke. About 20 men from Sparrowhawk evacuated to Broke, while fifteen of Broke's crew crossed to Sparrowhawk.

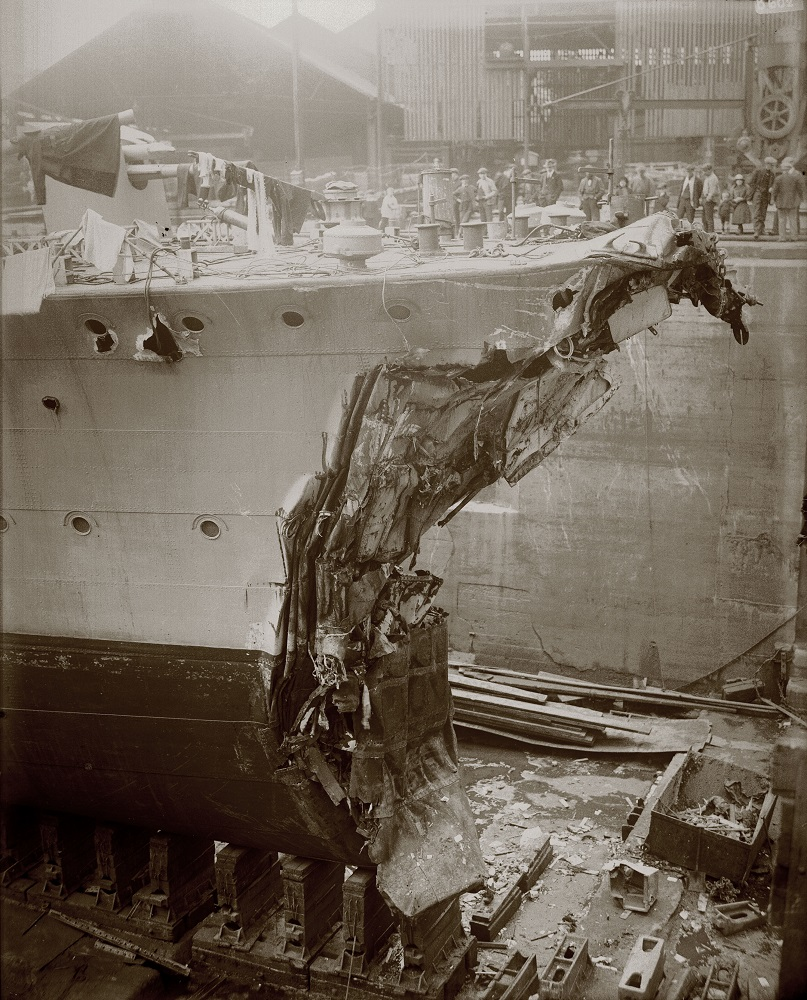
View of damaged HMS Broke in dry dock on Tyneside after Jutland

At this point a third destroyer, HMS Contest steamed into Sparrowhawk, removing 6 feet (1.8 m) from her stern. Contest was relatively unharmed and able to continue underway after the collision. Broke and Sparrowhawk remained wedged together for about half an hour before they could be separated and Broke got underway, taking 30 of Sparrowhawk's crew with her. Broke remained able to manoeuvre, although she had lost her bow. At around 01:30 the ship again encountered German destroyers which fired about six rounds into Broke, which managed to return one shot before the ships separated. The ship proceeded slowly towards Britain but by 06:00 on 2 June found that she could no longer travel into the high seas with her damaged bow and had to turn back towards Heligoland. The seas abated and the ship was able to head for the Tyne, arriving some two and a half days after the engagement.

=== Dover Strait engagement ===
On 20–21 April 1917, Broke – together with another large destroyer leader, HMS Swift – took part in the Battle of Dover Strait against a flotilla of six German torpedo boats from Zeebrugge who were attacking the Dover Barrage. In a confused action, Broke rammed SMS G42, and the two ships became locked together. For a while, there was hand-to-hand fighting between the crews, as the German sailors boarded the British ship, before Broke got free and G42 sank. Badly damaged, Broke had to be towed into Dover, her casualties were 21 killed and 36 wounded. Her commander, Edward Evans, was awarded the Distinguished Service Order and was extolled in the British press as "Evans of the Broke". In a refit in March 1918, the forward side-by-side 4-inch guns were replaced by a single 4.7-inch gun. Later that year, together with HMS Moorsom, Broke attacked a suspected U-boat which was actually the British submarine HMS E33 and fortunately escaped without damage.

=== Chilean service ===
HMS Broke was resold to Chile in May 1920, entering service with them as Almirante Uribe, where she was active until 1933.

== Bibliography ==
- Bennet, Geoffrey (1964). The Battle of Jutland. B. T Batsford.
- Colledge, J. J.; Warlow, Ben & Bush, Steve (2020). Ships of the Royal Navy: The Complete Record of all Fighting Ships of the Royal Navy from the 15th Century to the Present (5th revised and updated ed.). Seaforth Publishing. ISBN 978-1-5267-9327-0.
- Friedman, Norman (2009). British Destroyers From Earliest Days to the Second World War. Naval Institute Press. ISBN 978-1-59114-081-8.
- March, Edgar J. (1966). British Destroyers: A History of Development, 1892–1953; Drawn by Admiralty Permission From Official Records & Returns, Ships' Covers & Building Plans. Seeley Service. OCLC 164893555.
- Preston, Antony (1985). "Great Britain and Empire Forces". In Gray, Randal (ed.). Conway's All the World's Fighting Ships 1906–1921. Naval Institute Press. pp. 1–104. ISBN 0-85177-245-5.
- Nigel Steel; Peter Hart (2003). Jutland 1916. Cassell (Orion books). ISBN 0-304-36648-X.
- Stem, Robert C. (2008). Destroyer Battles: Epics of Naval Close Combat. Seaforth Publishing. ISBN 978-1848320079.
