= Chilean destroyer Almirante Lynch =

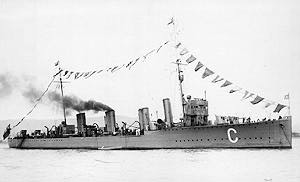
- Sister ship Almirante Condell

History

Chile
- Name: Almirante Lynch
- Namesake: Patricio Lynch
- Ordered: 1911
- Builder: J. Samuel White, UK
- Laid down: 1912
- Launched: 28 September 1912
- Commissioned: 1913
- Decommissioned: 19 December 1945
- Fate: Scrapped

General characteristics
- Class & type: Almirante Lynch-class destroyer
- Displacement: 1,430 long tons (1,453 t) standard; 1,850 long tons (1,880 t) full load
- Length: 101 m (331 ft 4 in)
- Beam: 9.9 m (32 ft 6 in)
- Draught: 3.35 m (11 ft 0 in)
- Propulsion: 6 × Foster-White mixed fired boilers; 3 shaft Parsons direct turbines; 30,000 hp (22,371 kW)
- Speed: 31 knots (57 km/h; 36 mph)
- Range: 4,205 nmi (7,788 km) at 15 kn (28 km/h; 17 mph)
- Complement: 160
- Armament: 6 × single 4 in (102 mm) guns; 4 × machine guns; 2 × twin 21 in (533 mm) torpedo tubes

Almirante Lynch was a destroyer in service with the Chilean Navy through World War I and World War II. She was named after Admiral Patricio Lynch, Chilean sailor, hero of the War of the Pacific.

The Chilean Navy ordered six ships from J. Samuel White in 1911. These destroyers were larger and more powerful than contemporary British destroyers. Almirante Lynch was built by the United Kingdom as part of a six ship class of Almirante Lynch-class destroyers, of which only two were delivered before the outbreak of war, and served in the Chilean Navy until 1945.

== Bibliography ==
- Whitley, M. J. (2000). Destroyers of World War Two: An International Encyclopedia. London: Cassell & Co. ISBN 1-85409-521-8.
