= Flag Officer-in-Charge, Humber =

Humber Station
- Active: 1914-1921, 1939-1945
- Country: United Kingdom
- Branch: Royal Navy
- Type: Naval station
- Part of: Royal Navy
- Garrison/HQ: HMS Wallington, (1914-1920); HMS Pembroke VII (1919-1920); HMS Pembroke VIII (1920-1921); HMS Beaver (1939-1945); HM Naval Base, Immingham (AO at Grimsby)

The Flag Officer-in-Charge, Humber was a Royal Navy officer who administered naval forces located at Immingham and Grimsby, Lincolnshire, England. His formation was sometimes known as the Humber Station or Humber Area. In World War I it was a sub-command of the Admiral of Patrols from 1914 to 1916, then came under the Commander-in-Chief at the Nore until 1921. In World War II the FOIC was responsible to the Commander-in-Chief, The Nore.

== History ==
Prior to World War I an Admiral of Patrols was appointed to command the destroyer and torpedo boat patrol flotillas that were formed and operating from different bases down the east coast of Britain, from the Forth to the Humber. Immingham was headquarters for 7th Destroyer Flotilla from August 1914 to November 1918. In 1915 The Auxiliary Patrol a component force under the (ADMP) based at Grimsby was designated Auxiliary Patrol Area IX, during this period HMNB Immingham was also a submarine base for British D class submarine. During World War II the Humber Force received shore support from this station from 1939 to 1940. In 1941 various mine-laying and mine-seeping flotillas and groups were under the command.

== Administration world war one ==
Name	Base/Flag Ship
Humber Station	HMS Wallington, (1917-1920), HMS Pembroke VII (1919-1920), HMS Pembroke VIII (1920-1921)

=== Senior Naval Officer, Grimsby ===
Post holders included:

	Rank	Insig	Name	Term	Notes/Ref
Senior Naval Officer, Grimsby
1	Commander		Charles. S. Forbes	November 1916 – 9 March 1919	(& Mobilising Officer, Humber District)
2	Captain		Francis H. Pollen	9 March 1919 – 15 June 1920	(Acting Cpt & Mobilising Officer, Humber District)

=== Commanding Officer, Humber Area ===
Post holders included:

	Rank	Insig	Name	Term	Notes/Ref
Commanding Officer, Humber Area
1	Captain		Stephen. H. Radcliffe	August 1920 – January, 1921	(as Commanding Officer, Humber Area)

== Administration world war two ==
Name	Base/Flag Ship
Humber Station	HMS Beaver (1939-1945)

=== Flag Officer-in-Charge, Humber ===
:Post holders included:

	Rank	Flag	Name	Term	Notes/Ref
Flag Officer-in-Charge, Humber
1	Rear-Admiral	Rear-Admiral - Royal Navy	Arthur Francis Pridham	September 1939 - 1 October 1940	(as Flag Officer, Humber Area)
2	Vice-Admiral	Vice-Admiral - Royal Navy	Reginald V. Holt	1 October 1940 - 15 October 1942	(retd)
3	Rear-Admiral	Rear-Admiral - Royal Navy	Cosmo M. Graham	15 October 1942 - July 1945	

==== Flag Captain, Chief Staff Officer and in command of HM Naval Base Immingham ====
Post holders included:

	Rank	Insig	Name	Term	Notes/Ref
Flag Captain, Chief Staff Officer, Humber, and Commander HMNB Immingham
1	Captain		Edwin Mansergh Palmer	22 December 1941 - July 1945	(retd)

== Naval formations in this command ==
Various units that served in this command included:

Naval Units	Based at	Date	Notes
4th Destroyer Flotilla	Humber	August - December, 1916	transfer from Grand Fleet allocated to Humber Force, 1 Cruiser (L) 1 depot ship, 10 - 15 destroyers
7th Destroyer Flotilla	Humber	August 1914 - November 1918	11 torpedo boat destroyers (Admiral of Patrols)
20th Destroyer Flotilla	Immingham	1914 - 1918	40th Division - 6 ships under Captain (D), Nore
20th Destroyer Flotilla	Immingham	1941	a specialist mine laying flotilla inc 13 ships
4th Minesweeping Flotilla	Immingham	1939 - 1941	8 ships
5th Motor Torpedo Boat Flotilla	Immingham	1939 - 1941	8 ships
2nd Submarine Flotilla	Immingham	August 1916 - February 1917	C class for coastal defence
3rd Submarine Flotilla	Immingham/Humber	September 1916 - 1918	D class for offensive patrols & C class for coastal defence
6th Submarine Flotilla	Humber	August 1914 - August 1916	C class for coastal defence

== Naval formations receiving shore support from this command ==
Various units that served in this command included:

Naval Units	Based at	Date	Notes
Humber Force	Humber	August - December, 1916	
East Coast Force	Humber (Admiral of Patrol)	August 1914 - November 1918	

== Sources ==
- Bertke, Donald A.; Smith, Gordon; Kindell, Don (2012). World War II Sea War, Volume 3: The Royal Navy is Bloodied in the Mediterranean. Lulu Publishing. ISBN 9781937470012.
- Friedman, Norman (2011). Naval Weapons of World War I. Barnsley, England: Seaforth Publishing. ISBN 9781848321007.
- Gilbert, Martin (1977). Winston S. Churchill (1. American ed., 1. [Dr.] ed.). Boston: Houghton Mifflin. ISBN 9780395251041.
- Harley, Simon; Lovell, Tony. (2017), "Grimsby - The Dreadnought Project". www.dreadnoughtproject.org. Harley and Lovell.
- Houterman, J.N. "Royal Navy Nore Command 1939-1945: Humber". unithistories.com. Houterman and Kloppes.
- Houterman, J.N. "Royal Navy (RN) Officers 1939-1945 - P: Palmer, Edwin Mansergh". www.unithistories.com. Houterman and Kloppes. Retrieved 7 July 2018.
- Parkinson, Jonathan (2018). The Royal Navy, China Station: 1864 - 1941: As seen through the lives of the Commanders in Chief. Leicester, England: Troubador Publishing Ltd. ISBN 9781788035217.
