= Chilean destroyer Almirante Condell =

Chilean Navy warship

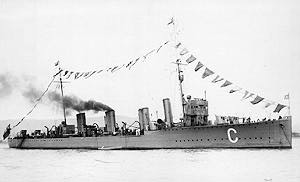
- Condell

History

Chile
- Name: Almirante Condell
- Ordered: 1911
- Builder: J. Samuel White
- Laid down: 1912
- Launched: 28 September 1912
- Commissioned: January 1914
- Decommissioned: 19 December 1945
- Fate: scrapped, 1955

General characteristics
- Class & type: Almirante Lynch-class destroyer
- Displacement: 1,430 long tons (1,453 t) standard; 1,850 long tons (1,880 t) full load
- Length: 101 m (331 ft 4 in)
- Beam: 9.9 m (32 ft 6 in)
- Draught: 3.35 m (11 ft 0 in)
- Propulsion: 6 × Foster-White mixed fired boilers; 3 shaft Parsons direct turbines; 30,000 shp (22,000 kW)
- Speed: 31 knots (57 km/h; 36 mph)
- Range: 4,205 nmi (7,788 km; 4,839 mi) at 15 knots (28 km/h; 17 mph)
- Complement: 160
- Armament: 6 × 4 in (102 mm) guns; 4 × machine guns; 3 × twin 21 in (533 mm) torpedo tubes

Almirante Condell was a destroyer which served with the Chilean Navy through World War I and World War II. She was the second ship in the Chilean Navy to bear this name.

The Chilean Navy ordered six ships from J. Samuel White in 1911. These destroyers were larger and more powerful than contemporary British destroyers. Almirante Condell was built by the United Kingdom as part of a six-ship Almirante Lynch class of destroyers, of which only two ships were delivered before the outbreak of war. Those two ships served in the Chilean Navy until 1945.

The ship was named after Admiral Carlos Condell, Chilean sailor, hero of the War of the Pacific.

== Bibliography ==
- Whitley, M. J. (2000). Destroyers of World War Two: An International Encyclopedia. London: Cassell & Co. ISBN 1-85409-521-8.
