= HMS Tipperary =

Destroyer of the Royal Navy

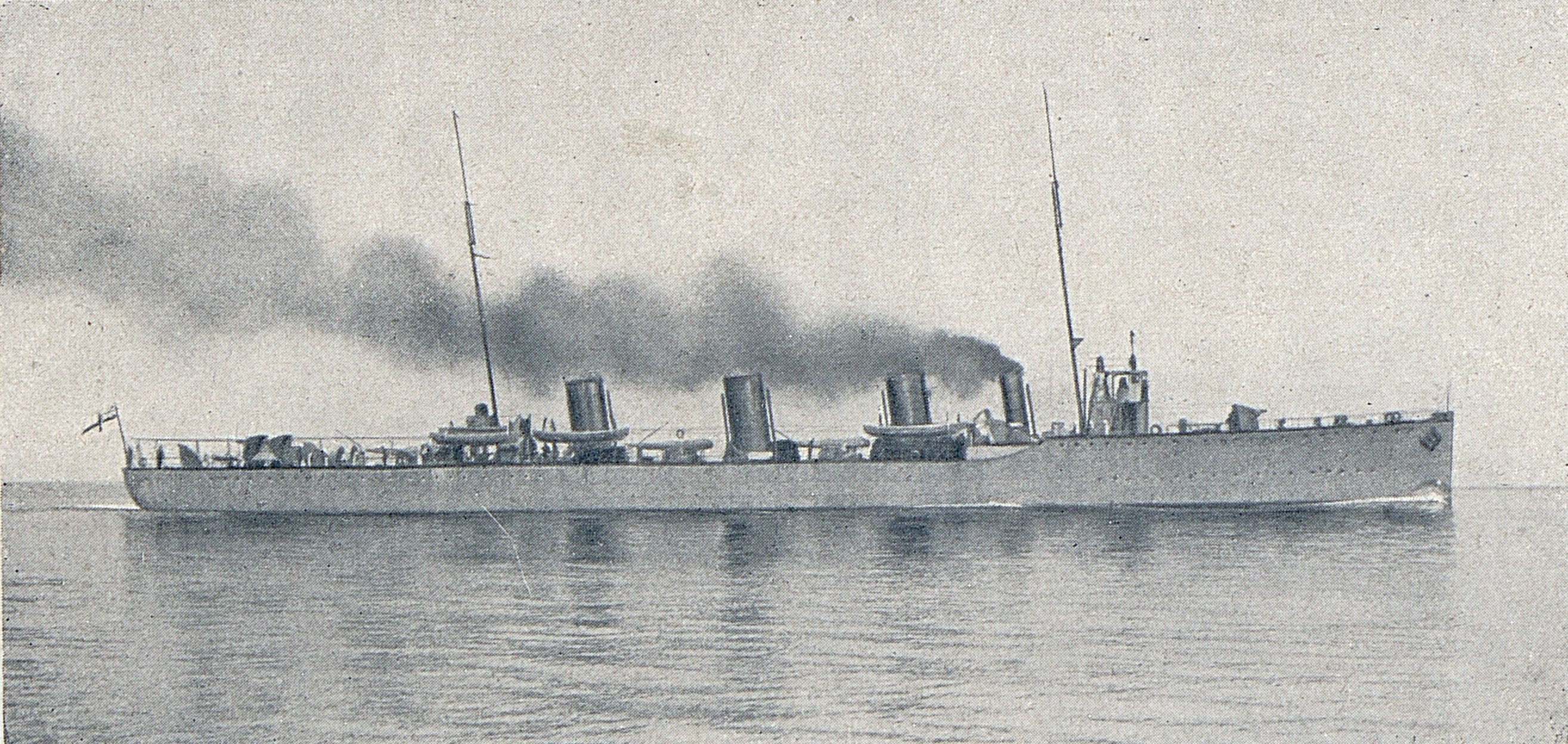
- Profile view of Tipperary

History

United Kingdom
- Name: Tipperary
- Builder: J. Samuel White, East Cowes
- Launched: 5 March 1915
- Completed: June 1915
- Acquired: September 1914
- Fate: Sunk during the Battle of Jutland, 1 June 1916

General characteristics
- Class & type: Faulknor-class flotilla leader
- Displacement: 1,742 long tons (1,770 t)
- Length: 331 ft 3 in (100.97 m) (o/a)
- Beam: 32 ft 6 in (9.9 m)
- Draught: 11 ft 8 in (3.6 m) (deep load)
- Installed power: 6 × White-Forster boilers; 30,000 shp (22,000 kW)
- Propulsion: 3 shafts; 3 steam turbines
- Speed: 30 knots (56 km/h; 35 mph)
- Range: 2,405 nmi (4,454 km; 2,768 mi) at 15 knots (28 km/h; 17 mph)
- Complement: 203
- Armament: As built: 6 × single 4 in (102 mm) guns; 1 × single 37 mm (1.5 in) AA gun; 2 × twin 21 in (533 mm) torpedo tubes

HMS Tipperary was one of six Almirante Lynch-class destroyer that had been ordered from Britain for the Chilean Navy before the start of World War I in 1914. Four of the ships were still construction when the war began and were purchased by the Royal Navy (RN). Completed in 1915 as a Faulknor-class flotilla leader, Tipperary was initially assigned to the Harwich Force, but was transferred in 1916 to the Grand Fleet where she was sunk during the Battle of Jutland.

== Design and description ==
The Almirante Lynch-class ships were ordered by Chile in 1912 to counter four destroyers ordered by Argentina from France. Two of these ships had been delivered before the war began and the British purchased the other four; the two that were almost complete were bought in August and the pair which had not yet been launched the following month. The first pair to enter service had minimal alterations to suit the RN, but the latter two were more heavily modified.

The ships were the second largest destroyers in the world, after HMS Swift, and served in the RN as the Faulknor-class flotilla leaders. The Faulknors had a length between perpendiculars of 320 feet (97.5 m), an overall length of 331 feet 3 inches (100.97 m), a beam of 32 feet 6 inches (9.9 m) and a draught of 11 feet 8 inches (3.6 m) at deep load. They displaced 1,742 long tons (1,770 t) at normal load and 1,985 long tons (2,017 t) at deep load. The crew of Tipperary and her sister ship Botha consisted of 203 officers and ratings.

The Faulknor class were powered by three Parsons direct-drive steam turbines, each driving one propeller shaft using steam provided by six mixed-firing White-Forster boilers. The turbines developed a total of 30,000 shaft horsepower (22,000 kW) and gave a maximum speed of around 30 knots (56 km/h; 35 mph). The ships carried 433 long tons (440 t) of coal and 83 long tons (84 t) of fuel oil that gave them a range of 4,205 nautical miles (7,788 km; 4,839 mi) at 15 knots (28 km/h; 17 mph).

The main armament of the Faulknor class consisted of six quick-firing (QF) four-inch (102 mm) Mk VI guns on pivot mounts with large gun shields. The arrangement of the guns and torpedo tubes on Tipperary and Botha differed from their half-sisters Faulknor and Broke in that the former had the guns grouped in a triangle formation mirrored fore and aft; the forward group had one on the centreline on the forecastle and the other two were on each side of the forward superstructure while the rear group had the sternmost gun on the quarterdeck and the others were further forward, one gun on each broadside. They were also fitted with four torpedo tubes in two rotating twin-tube mounts for 21-inch (533 mm) torpedoes, one mount on each broadside. For defense against aircraft, the sisters were initially equipped with a 37 mm (1.5 in) anti-aircraft gun on a platform between the middle funnels; this was later replaced by a pair of two-pounder (40 mm (1.6 in)) Mk I guns on single mounts on separate platforms between the rearmost and middle funnels.

== Construction and career ==
Originally named Almirante Riveros when ordered from J. Samuel White in 1912, the ship was renamed Tipperary when purchased by the RN in 1914. She was launched at the East Cowes shipyard on 5 March 1915 and completed in June. Commissioned by Captain Barry Domvile, Tipperary initially served as the second flotilla leader with the 3rd Destroyer Flotilla in the Harwich Force. Late in that same year, she took charge of a detachment of destroyers from the 2nd Flotilla, while in March 1916, Tipperary had rejoined the Harwich Force, being attached to the Fifth Light Cruiser Squadron.

In May 1916, Tipperary was made the leader of the 4th Flotilla, a formation which directly supported the Grand Fleet.

=== Sinking ===
About 21:58 GMT on 31 May 1916, while 4th Destroyer Flotilla was searching for the German High Seas Fleet in the North Sea in the Battle of Jutland, she encountered the enemy's 7th Flotilla (destroyers). The Imperial German Naval vessels launched torpedoes at the British ships, none of which hit, and 7th Flotilla then turned away. Nicholas Jellicoe's account states that "Between 23:15 and 23:20 a lookout [on HMS Garland] ... saw what he thought were enemy ships on the starboard quarter". A few minutes later, Tipperary flashed the recognition signal and was immediately lit up by the searchlights of three German battleships and three light cruisers. From 23:30 to about 23:34, around 150 5.9-inch shells from SMS Westfalen and SMS Nassau were fired at Tipperary; she was badly stricken by this fire, which left her bridge damaged and most of her forward crew casualties, including her commander, Captain Wintour. At about 02:00 GMT on 1 June 1916, she was abandoned and sank in the following hours due to battle damage. 150 of her crew of 197 were killed in the action, a number of the survivors were rescued from the sea by the Imperial German Navy and transported back to Germany as prisoners of war.

Stoker David Eunson described the sinking: "As we floated away on that awful night, many died of sheer exhaustion and suffering. After drifting for well nigh 5 hours we were picked up at dawn. I saw the Tipperary, a mass of flames, keel over".

== Aftermath ==
The wrecksite is designated as a protected place under the Protection of Military Remains Act 1986.

== Bibliography ==
- Campbell, John (1998). Jutland: An Analysis of the Fighting. Conway Maritime Press. ISBN 0-85177-750-3.
- Colledge, J. J.; Warlow, Ben & Bush, Steve (2020). Ships of the Royal Navy: The Complete Record of all Fighting Ships of the Royal Navy from the 15th Century to the Present (5th revised and updated ed.). Seaforth Publishing. ISBN 978-1-5267-9327-0.
- Friedman, Norman (2009). British Destroyers From Earliest Days to the Second World War. Naval Institute Press. ISBN 978-1-59114-081-8.
- Jellicoe, Nicholas (2016). Jutland: The Unfinished Battle. Seaforth Publishing. ISBN 978-1-84832-321-6.
- March, Edgar J. (1966). British Destroyers: A History of Development, 1892–1953; Drawn by Admiralty Permission From Official Records & Returns, Ships' Covers & Building Plans. Seeley Service. OCLC 164893555.
- Massie, Robert K (2003). Castles of Steel: Britain, Germany, and the Winning of the Great War at Sea. Random House. ISBN 0-345-40878-0.
- Preston, Antony (1985). "Great Britain and Empire Forces". In Gray, Randal (ed.). Conway's All the World's Fighting Ships 1906–1921. Naval Institute Press. pp. 1–104. ISBN 0-85177-245-5.
- "SI 2008/0950 Designation under the Protection of Military Remains Act 1986". opsi.gov.uk.
