= SMS G42 =

G41-class large torpedo boat of the Imperial German Navy and sunk in 1917

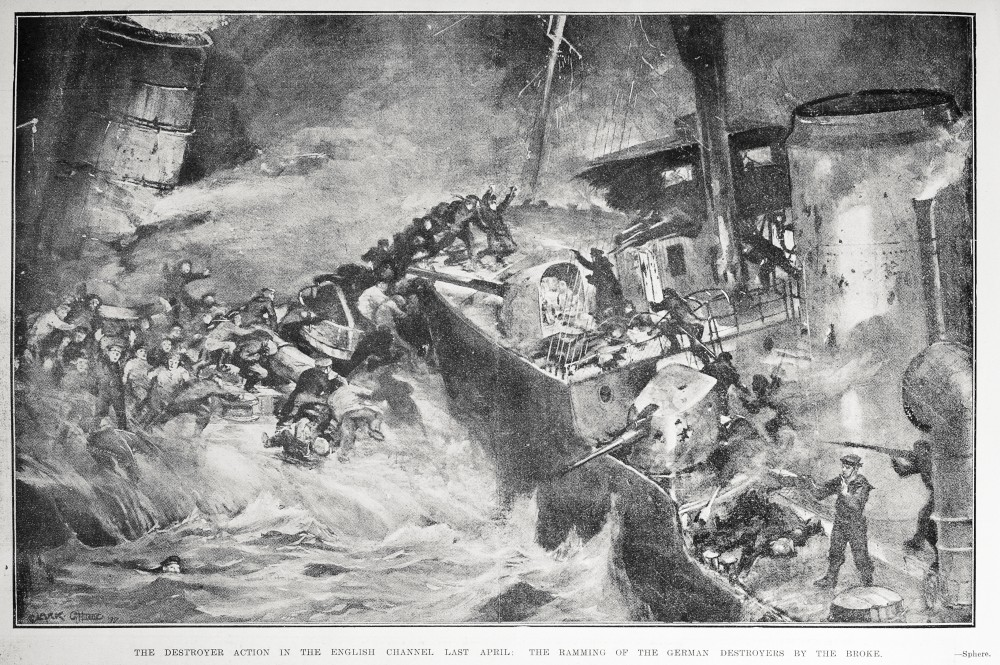
- SMS G42 (left) being rammed by HMS Broke in the English Channel on 20 April 1917

History

German Empire
- Ordered: 1914 Peacetime order
- Builder: Germaniawerft, Kiel, Germany
- Launched: 20 May 1915
- Commissioned: 10 November 1915
- Fate: Sunk by HMS Broke, 21 April 1917

General characteristics
- Class & type: V25-class torpedo boat
- Displacement: 1,147 t (1,129 long tons) deep load
- Length: 83.0 m (272 ft 4 in) long oa
- Beam: 8.4 m (27 ft 7 in)
- Draft: 3.4 m (11 ft 2 in)
- Propulsion: 3 water tube boilers; Steam turbines, 2 Shafts; 24,000 PS (24,000 shp; 18,000 kW)
- Speed: 33.5 kn (62.0 km/h; 38.6 mph)
- Range: 1,950 nmi (3,610 km; 2,240 mi) ay
- Complement: 87 officers and sailors
- Armament: 3 × 8.8 cm (3.5 in) SK L/45 guns; 6 × 500 mm (20 in) torpedo tubes; 24 mines

SMS G42 was a 1913 Type Large Torpedo Boat (Großes Torpedoboot) of the Imperial German Navy (Kaiserliche Marine) during World War I, and the 18th ship of her class.

== Construction ==
Built by Germaniawerft in Kiel, she was laid down in February 1915, launched on 20 May 1915 and commissioned on 10 November 1915. The "G" in G42 refers to the shipyard at which she was constructed.

G42 was 83.0 metres (272 ft 4 in) long overall and 82.2 metres (269 ft 8 in) between perpendiculars, with a beam of 8.4 metres (27 ft 7 in) and a draft of 3.4 metres (11 ft 2 in). Displacement was 960 tonnes (940 long tons) normal and 1,147 tonnes (1,129 long tons) deep load. Three oil-fired water-tube boilers fed steam to 2 sets of AEG-Vulcan steam turbines rated at 24,000 metric horsepower (24,000 shp; 18,000 kW), giving a speed of 33.5 knots (62.0 km/h; 38.6 mph). 326 tonnes (321 long tons) of fuel oil was carried, giving a range of 1,950 nautical miles (3,610 km; 2,240 mi) at 17 knots (31 km/h; 20 mph).

Armament originally consisted of three 8.8 cm SK L/45 naval guns in single mounts, together with six 50 cm (19.7 in) torpedo tubes with two fixed single tubes forward and 2 twin mounts aft. Up to 24 mines could be carried. In 1916 the 8.8 cm guns were replaced by three 10.5 cm SK L/45 naval guns. The ship had a complement of 87 officers and men.

== Service ==
G42 was a member of the Third Torpedo Boat Flotilla, Sixth Half-Flotilla of the High Seas Fleet at the Battle of Jutland. The 3rd Flotilla launched an unsuccessful torpedo attack against British Battlecruisers at about 18:37, and after turning away, exchanged fire with the crippled British destroyer HMS Shark. The British destroyer managed to immobilize the German destroyer V48 in this exchange before being sunk by a German torpedo. G42 attempted to take V48 under tow, but heavy shellfire from the battleships Colossus and Collingwood aborted the attempt, driving off G42. While G42 was not hit by British shells, near-misses caused condenser leaks. G42 then joined the destroyer screen for the damaged Lützow, making smoke to help screen the battlecruiser.

On 23 October 1916, the Third and Ninth Torpedo Boat Flotillas left Germany for Zeebrugge in Belgium in order to reinforce the German naval forces based in Flanders, and to assist German U-boats in their attacks on Allied shipping. G42 remained part of the Sixth Half-Flotilla of the Third Flotilla. The Sixth Half-Flotilla took part in a large scale raid into the English Channel on the night of 26/27 October 1916, hoping to attack the drifters watching the anti-submarine nets of the Dover Barrage, and to sink Allied shipping in the Channel. The Sixth Half Flotilla sank the British destroyer Flirt, which had stopped to rescue survivors of a drifter that had been hit in an earlier attack, before returning to base. The Third Torpedo Boat Flotilla returned to Germany in November that year.

The Third Flotilla returned to Zeebrugge on 24 March 1917, and together with the other torpedo boat Flotillas based in Flanders, took part in unsuccessful sorties into the English Channel on 10, 13 and 18 April. The Germans tried again on the night of 20/21 April 1917, in the Battle of Dover Strait, splitting their force into three groups. One, Gruppe Gautier, consisting of G42, G85, S53, V71, V73 and V81 was to attack the Dover Barrage and attack Dover, while the second, Gruppe Albrecht, also consisting of six torpedo boats, was to attack the Barrage and Calais, while the third force of three torpedo boats, Gruppe Zander was tasked with attacking shipping in The Downs. At about 23:30 hr on 20 April Gruppe Gautier encountered the trawler Sabreur and attacked with gunfire, scoring two hits. While the Germans believed that they had sunk the trawler, Sabreur managed to escape. Gruppe Gautier then shelled Dover and was fired on in response by British coastal artillery. It then moved off down the Channel to attack the Dover Barrage, but encountered the British Flotilla Leaders Broke and Swift. G42, commanded by Bernd von Arnim, was rammed by Broke. Both ships were heavily damaged in the collision, and were entangled together for a short time. While the ships were entangled, close-quarters battle broke out between the two crews until Broke disengaged. G42 sank with 36 sailors killed in action. G85, torpedoed by Swift, was also sunk in this action.
