= Battle of Dover Strait (1917) =

Naval battle of the First World War

Second Battle of Dover Strait
- Part of the First World War
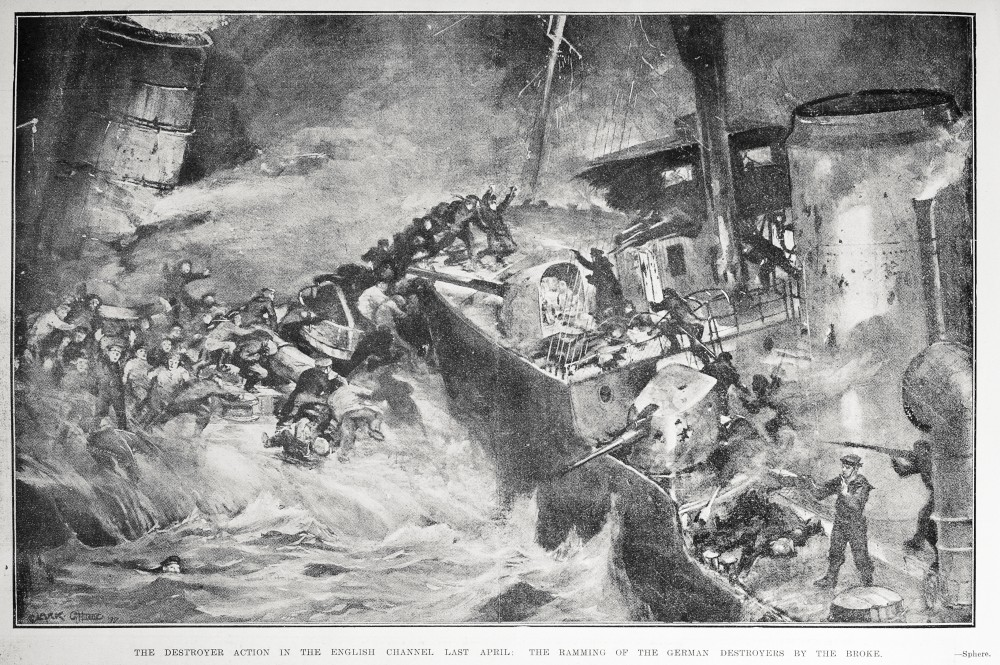
- Drawing of HMS Broke ramming SMS G42.
Date	20–21 April 1917
Location	Dover Strait 51°01′N 1°29′E
Result	British victory

Belligerents
United Kingdom	German Empire

Commanders and leaders
Edward Evans	Theophil Gautier

Strength
HMS Broke; HMS Swift	6 torpedo boats

Casualties and losses
21 killed; Broke: severe damage; Swift: 1 killed, 4 wounded; slight damage	71 killed; 141 PoW; 2 torpedo boats sunk
- Location of battle

The Second Battle of Dover Strait was a naval battle of the First World War, fought in the Dover Strait in April 1917 (not the Battle of Dover Strait of 1916). Two Royal Navy destroyers defeated a superior force of German Kaiserliche Marine torpedo boats. Two German torpedo boats were sunk and both British destroyers suffered damage.

== Prelude ==
During the evening of 20 April 1917, two groups of torpedo boats of the German Navy left Zeebrugge to raid the Dover Strait, bombarding British and French positions on shore and to engage warships patrolling the Dover Barrage—the field of floating mines and nets that obstructed German ships and U-boats from getting into the English Channel. Six torpedo boats of the 6th Torpedo Boat half-Flotilla bombarded Calais and the six of the 5th Torpedo Boat half-Flotilla (Korvettenkapitän Gautier) bombarded Dover just before midnight.

== Battle ==
Two flotilla leaders of the Royal Navy — HMS Broke and Swift — were on patrol near Dover and engaged six of the German ships early on 21 April near the Goodwin Sands. In a confused action, Swift torpedoed SMS G85. Broke rammed SMS G42 [Kapitänleutnant Bernd von Arnim] and the two ships became locked together. For a while, there was hand-to-hand fighting between the crews, as the German sailors tried to board the British ship, before Broke got free and G42 sank. Swift was slightly damaged and had to wait until dawn to return to port, due to a loss of bearings. A search by Dover destroyers found Broke and it was towed into the eastern arm of the harbour, the drifters in port sounding their sirens and horns.

== Aftermath ==
=== Analysis ===
Two British destroyers had attacked six German vessels and sunk two of them, both of the British ships receiving damage. It was a moral-boosting success and the two British captains were promoted and awarded the Distinguished Service Order. The press and propaganda feted them. The Germans did not attack the Dover Strait with ships for ten months.

=== Casualties ===
Broke suffered 21 crew killed and 36 wounded; Swift suffered the loss of one man killed and four wounded. Swift and other Dover Patrol ships rescued 141 German sailors and 13 dead were buried at St James's Cemetery in Dover.

== German order of battle ==
German raiding force
Ship	Flag	Class	Notes
5th Half Flotilla (Gruppe Gautier)
SMS G42	Imperial German Navy	V25-class torpedo boat	Rammed by HMS Broke, sank
SMS G85	Imperial German Navy	V25-class torpedo boat	Torpedoed by HMS Swift
SMS S53	Imperial German Navy	V25-class torpedo boat	
SMS V71	Imperial German Navy	V25-class torpedo boat	
SMS V73	Imperial German Navy	V25-class torpedo boat	
SMS V81	Imperial German Navy	V25-class torpedo boat	
6th (Z) Half Flotilla (Gruppe Albrecht)
SMS G95	Imperial German Navy	V25-class torpedo boat	
SMS G91	Imperial German Navy	V25-class torpedo boat	
SMS G96	Imperial German Navy	V125-class torpedo boat	
SMS V47	Imperial German Navy	V25-class torpedo boat	Kapitänleutnant Bernd von Arnim
SMS V68	Imperial German Navy	V25-class torpedo boat	
SMS V70	Imperial German Navy	V25-class torpedo boat	

== Bibliography ==
- Baldwin, H. W. (1962). World War I: An Outline History. New York: Harper and Row. OCLC 468558099.
- Dunn, Steve (2017). Securing the Narrow Sea: The Dover Patrol 1914–1918. Barnsley: Seaforth. ISBN 978-1-84832-249-3.
- Chatterton, E. K. (1923). The Auxiliary Patrol. London: Sidgwick and Jackson. OCLC 14232571.
- Karau, Mark (2014). The Naval Flank of the Western Front: The German MarineKorps Flandern 1914–1918. Barnsley: Seaforth. ISBN 978-1-84832-231-8. (originally published as Karau, Mark (2003). Wielding the Dagger; The MarineKorps Flandern and the German War Effort, 1914−1918. Contributions in Military Studies, No. 226. Westport, CT: Praeger. ISBN 978-0-31-332475-8.
- Liddle, Peter H. (1985). The Sailor's War, 1914–1918. New York: Stirling. ISBN 978-0-71-371397-8.
- Newbolt, Henry (2003) [1928]. Naval Operations. History of the Great War Based on Official Documents by Direction of the Historical Section of the Committee of Imperial Defence. Vol. IV (pbk. repr. Imperial War Museum Department of Printed Books and Naval & Military Press, Uckfield ed.). London: Longmans, Green & Co. ISBN 978-1-84-342492-5.
