= Charles John Wintour =

Royal Navy officer (1871–1916)

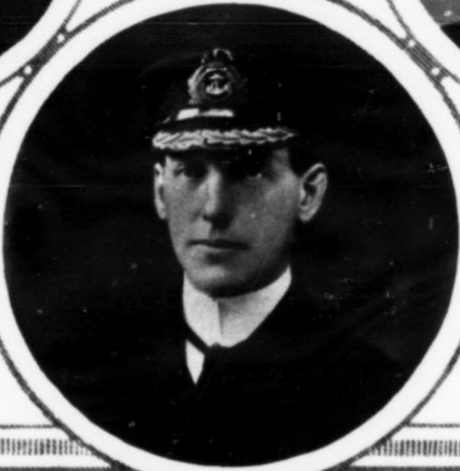
Charles John Wintour

Captain Charles John Wintour (10 December 1871 – 31 May 1916) was a Royal Navy officer. He was killed in action at the Battle of Jutland in 1916.

The son of a clergyman, Wintour joined HMS Britannia as a cadet in 1885. A navigation specialist, during the early part of his career he held a succession of appointments as navigating officer, before commanding a number of destroyers and cruisers. In 1913, he was appointed Captain (D) of the 4th Destroyer Flotilla. At the Battle of Jutland in 1916, Wintour was killed in action on the bridge of his flagship HMS Tipperary.

Mount Wintour in Alberta, Canada, is named in his honour.
