= 4th Destroyer Flotilla =

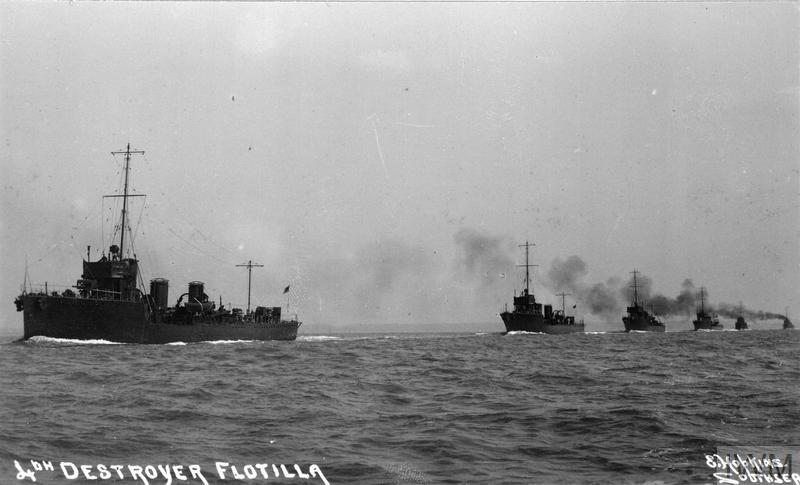
- The 4th Destroyer Flotilla during the First World War
- Active: August 1909 – July 1951
- Country: United Kingdom
- Branch: Royal Navy
- Size: Flotilla

Commanders
- First: Captain Reginald Y. Tyrwhitt
- Last: Captain Deric Holland-Martin

The British 4th Destroyer Flotilla or Fourth Destroyer Flotilla, was a naval formation of the Royal Navy from August 1909 to July 1951.

== History ==
In 1907 the Home Fleet had a large formation of destroyers called the Home Fleet Flotilla of destroyers, Between February and June 1909 it was divided to form the 2nd and 4th Destroyer Flotillas. Between 1909 and 1912 it was part of the Home Fleet - 3rd Division at Portsmouth. From 1912 to August 1914 it was reassigned and operating with the 1st Fleet. At the start of World War One the flotilla was reassigned to the new Grand Fleet and was engaged at the Battle of Jutland it remained with the GF until September 1916 when it was transferred to the Humber Force that was receiving shore support from the Humber Station till December 1916. The flotilla was next allocated to the Portsmouth Command until July 1917. After being ordered to leave Portsmouth it was reassigned to the Commander-in-Chief, Devonport where it remained till November 1918. Following the end of World War One it was placed back with the Home Fleet until November 1919 when it was re-allocated to the Atlantic Fleet until August 1923. It was reassigned to the Mediterranean Fleet where it remained until August 1936 when it was disbanded. The flotilla was re-activated in September 1938 until October 1939 using only Tribal Class destroyers. It was next sent to join the Home Fleet from October 1939 – August 1941. Sent back to the Mediterranean to join Force H from August 1941 – April 1942. It returned to the Home Fleet in April 1942 and stayed with it till November. Between November 1942 and January 1943 it was back operating in Mediterranean.In January 1943 it was sent to join the Eastern Fleet in Trincomalee, Ceylon and remained there until October 1943. Sent back to Europe to re-join Force H in the Mediterranean until January 1944 before returning Ceylon. It stays with the East Indies Fleet until November 1944 then is ordered back to Europe to join forces in the Mediterranean Sea until 1946. It transfers back to home waters where it stays until March 1951 it was re-designated the 4th Destroyer Squadron. The unit reforms again as part of the Mediterranean Fleet

== Organizational changes ==
Note: Command structure organizational changes took place within Royal Navy post war period the term Flotilla was previously applied to a tactical unit until 1951 which led to the creation of three specific Flag Officers, Flotillas responsible for the Eastern, Home and Mediterranean fleets the existing destroyer flotillas were re-organized now as administrative squadrons.

== Operational deployments ==
Assigned to	Dates	Notes
Home Fleet	March 1907 to February 1909	
Home Fleet, Portsmouth Division	March 1909 to May 1912	
Home Fleets, First Fleet	May 1912 to July 1914	
Grand Fleet	August 1914 – September 1916	
Humber Station	September 1916 – December 1916	
Portsmouth Command	December 1916 – March 1917	
Plymouth Command	March 1917 – November 1918	disbanded
Home Fleet	April to November 1919	reformed
Atlantic Fleet	November 1919 to August 1923	
Mediterranean Fleet	August 1923 to August 1936	disbanded
Mediterranean Fleet	September 1938 to October 1939	reforms as 2nd Tribal Flotilla/4th DF
Home Fleet	October 1939 – August 1941	
Force H	August 1941 – April 1942	
Home Fleet	April to November 1942	
Mediterranean Fleet	November 1942 to January 1943	
Eastern Fleet	January to October 1943	
Force H	October 1943 – January 1944	
East Indies Fleet	January to November 1944	
Mediterranean Fleet	November 1944 to 1946	
Home Fleet	1946 to 1951	

== Administration ==
=== Captains (D) afloat 4th Destroyer Flotilla ===
Incomplete list of post holders included:

	Rank	Name	Term	Notes
Captain (D) afloat 4th Destroyer Flotilla
1	Captain	Reginald Y. Tyrwhitt	10 August 1909 – 2 August 1910	(later Adm. of the Fleet)
2	Captain	Mortimer Silver	2 August 1910 – 31 July 1912	
3	Captain	Wilfred Henderson	1 May 1912 – 5 July 1913	
4	Captain	Raymond Nugent	8 August 1912	
5	Captain	Robert Corbett	5 July 1913 – 20 August 1913	
6	Captain	Charles Wintour	20 August 1913 – 31 May 1916	
7	Captain	Charles D. Roper	1914	
8	Captain	Edward Gladstone	3 June 1916 – 7 July 1916	
9	Captain	Charles D. Roper	8 June 1915 – 6 July 1916	
10	Captain	Percy Withers	6 July 1916 – 7 January 1917	
11	Captain	Arthur E. Wood	1 September 1917 – 1 March 1919	
12	Captain	Dashwood Moir	21 December 1920 – 15 January 1923	
13	Captain	Sidney Bailey	15 January 1923 – 15 January 1925	(later Adm.)
14	Captain	the Hon. Edward Bingham	September, 1923 – 1 October 1924	(later R.Adm.)
15	Captain	Edmond Mackinnon	1 October 1924 – 29 April 1926	
16	Captain	Cyril Benson	13 September 1926 – June, 1928	
17	Captain	Bertram Watson	31 May 1928 – April, 1930	(later V.Adm.)
18	Captain	Hugh Rogers	June 1930 – May, 1932	
19	Captain	Gerald Harrison	29 April 1932 – 18 October 1933	(later R.Adm.)
20	Captain	Rhoderick McGrigor	22 September 1936	(later Adm. of the Fleet)
21	Captain	George H. Creswell	1 May 1939 – 2 January 1940	
22	Captain	Philip Louis Vian	1 January 1940 – 12 July 1941	(later Adm. of the Fleet)
Flotilla is re-established in 1946 until March 1951.
21	Captain	Ralph G. Swallow	1946-August 1949	
22	Captain	Deric Holland-Martin	August 1949 – 1950	

== Composition 1946 to 1950 ==
Included:
(United Kingdom) , Home Fleet 1946–1948
4th Destroyer Squadron

- HMS Agincourt (Leader)
- HMS Aisne (March 1948)
- HMS Alamein (May 1948)
- HMS Barrosa* (February 1947
- HMS Corunna* (June 1947)
- HMS Dunkirk (December 1946)
- HMS Jutland (April 1947)

(United Kingdom) , Home Fleet 1949
4th Destroyer Squadron

- HMS Agincourt (Leader)
- HMS Aisne
- HMS Alamein
- HMS Barrosa
- HMS Corunna
- HMS Dunkirk
- HMS Jutland

(United Kingdom) , Home Fleet 1950
4th Destroyer Squadron

- HMS Agincourt (Leader)
- HMS Aisne (to September 1950)
- HMS Alamein
- HMS Barrosa
- HMS Corunna
- HMS Dunkirk
- HMS Jutland (to April 1950)

== Sources ==
- "Brassey's Naval and Shipping Annual 1921". Brassey's Naval and Shipping Annual. London: William Clowes and Sons. 1921. OCLC 5973357.
- Harley, Simon; Lovell, Tony. (2018) "Fourth Destroyer Flotilla (Royal Navy) - The Dreadnought Project". www.dreadnoughtproject.org. Harley and Lovell.
- Hobbs, David (2014). Warships of the Great War Era: A History in Ship Models. Barnsley, England: Seaforth Publishing. ISBN 978-1-84832-212-7.
- Watson, Dr Graham. (2015) Royal Navy Organisation and Ship Deployments 1900-1914". www.naval-history.net. G. Smith.
- Watson, Dr Graham. (2015) "Royal Navy Organisation and Ship Deployment, Inter-War Years 1914-1918". www.naval-history.net. Gordon Smith.
- Watson, Dr Graham. (2015) "Royal Navy Organisation in World War 2, 1939-1945". www.naval-history.net. Gordon Smith.
- Willmott, H. P. (2009). The Last Century of Sea Power, Volume 1: From Port Arthur to Chanak, 1894–1922. Bloomington, IN, USA: Indiana University Press. ISBN 978-0-253-00356-0.
