= QF 4-inch naval gun Mk VI, X =

Ordnance QF 4 inch gun Mk VI, X
- Type: Light naval gun
- Place of origin: United Kingdom

Service history
- In service: 1913–1945
- Used by: United Kingdom, Chile
- Wars: World War I

Production history
- Manufacturer: Elswick Ordnance Company
- No. built: 29

Specifications
- Mass: 3,136 lb (1,422 kg)
- Length: 165.1 in (4,190 mm)
- Barrel length: 160.1 in (4,070 mm) bore (40 calibres)
- Shell: Separate QF
- Shell weight: 31 pounds (14.1 kg)
- Calibre: 4-inch (102 mm)
- Elevation: PXI Mount +25°
- Muzzle velocity: 2,300 ft/s (700 m/s)
- Maximum firing range: 11,630 yards (10,630 m) at +25°

The QF 4-inch gun Mk VI (Note: Mk VI = Mark 6. Britain used Roman numerals to denote Marks (models) of ordnance until after World War II. This was the sixth model of 4-inch QF naval gun.) was an Elswick Ordnance Company (EOC) design that was used aboard a few British flotilla leaders and smaller warships during the First World War. A similar EOC gun was designated as the QF Mk X.

== Mk VI gun ==
The Mk VI was an EOC "Pattern S" gun that that served as the primary armament of the Chilean Almirante Lynch-class destroyers built during the early 1910s. Four of these ships were still under construction when the war began in August 1914 and were purchased by the Royal Navy where they were known as the Faulknor class. Only 29 guns were built; its ammunition was incompatible with other British guns. The submarine Swordfish was equipped with the gun after she was converted into a patrol boat in 1918. The Acacia-class sloop Mimosa was also equipped with the weapon.

== Mk X gun ==
A single EOC "Pattern Q" gun of similar design was purchased and designated as the Mk X. It is doubtful that it was mounted on a ship.

== See also ==
- List of naval guns

=== Weapons of comparable role, performance and era ===
- 10.5 cm SK L/45 naval gun : German equivalent
- 4"/50 caliber gun : US Navy equivalent

== Sources ==
- Campbell, N. J. M. (1986). "British Naval Guns 1880–1945, No 18". In Lambert, Andrew (ed.). Warship X. Conway Maritime Press. pp. 117–120. ISBN 0-85177-449-0.
- DiGuilian, Tony. "United Kingdom / Britain 4"/40 (10.2 cm) QF Mark VI and Mark X". Navweaps.com.
- Friedman, Norman (2011). Naval Weapons of World War One: Guns, Torpedoes, Mines and ASW Weapons of All Nations; An Illustrated Directory. Seaforth Publishing. ISBN 978-1-84832-100-7.
