= Battle of Jutland order of battle =

World War I order of battle

Maps showing the approach of the fleets to the Battle of Jutland and details of the two major actions.

The Battle of Jutland was fought on 31 May and 1 June 1916, in the waters of the North Sea, between forces of the Royal Navy Grand Fleet and Imperial German Navy High Seas Fleet. The battle involved 250 warships, and, in terms of combined tonnage of vessels engaged, was the largest naval battle in history.

The Royal Navy had established a blockade of the North Sea at the start of the war and the German Hochseeflotte could not match the larger Grand Fleet. The German plan was to use the threat of an attack by their battlecruisers on British ports to lure the British battlecruisers into a trap where they could be defeated by a superior force of battleships without encountering the rest of the Grand Fleet. Aware of all German naval movements, the British fleet sortied to support their battlecruisers and bring the German fleet to battle.

In the event, although more British ships were sunk or damaged, the overall strategic situation was unchanged.

== Summary ==
=== Ships present ===
Warships by number and size of main armament
	Royal Navy	Imperial German Navy
Dreadnoughts	28 in total 8 × 15-inch: 2 × Revenge class (28,000 tons displacement, 21 knots top speed); 4 × Queen Elizabeth class (27,500 tons, 24 kn.); 10 × 14-inch: HMS Canada (28,622 tons, 23 kn. (Note: Canada was being built for the Chilean Navy but purchased for the Royal Navy at the start of the war.)); 10 × 13.5-inch: 3 × King George V class (25,420 tons, 21 kn.); 3 × Iron Duke class (25,000 tons, 21.5 kn.); HMS Erin (22,780 tons, 21 kn.); 4 × Orion class (21,922 tons, 21 kn.); 14 × 12-inch HMS Agincourt (28,750 tons, 22 kn.) 10 × 12-inch: 2 × Colossus class (20,030 tons, 21 kn.); HMS Neptune (19,680 tons, 21 kn.); 3 × St Vincent class (19,700 tons, 21 kn.); 3 × Bellerophon class (18,596 tons, 21 kn.)	16 in total 10 × 12-in. 4 × Kaiser class (25,420 tons, 21 kn.) 4 × König class (25,389 tons, 21 kn.) 12 × 12-in. 4 × Helgoland class (22,448 tons, 20.5 kn.) 12 × 11-in. 4 × Nassau class (18,575 tons, 19 kn.)
Pre-dreadnought battleships		6 total' 4 × 11-in.: SMS Hessen (12,999 tons, 18 kn.); 5 × Deutschland class (12,983 tons, 19 kn.)
Battlecruisers	9 total 8 × 13.5-in.: HMS Tiger (28,500 tons, 28 kn.); HMS Queen Mary (26,770 tons, 28 kn.); 2 × Lion class (26,270 tons, 27.5 kn.); 8 × 12-in.: 2 × Indefatigable class (18,500 tons, 25.8 kn.); 3 × Invincible class (17,250 tons, 25 kn.)	5 total 8 × 12-in (30.5 cm): 2 × Derfflinger class (26,200 tons, 26.5 kn.); 10 × 11-in.: SMS Seydlitz (24,593 tons, 26.5 kn.); SMS Moltke (22,216 tons, 25.5 kn.); 8 × 11-in.: SMS Von der Tann (19,060 tons, 24.8 kn.)
Armoured cruisers	8 total 4 × 9.2-in., 5 × 7.5-in.: 3 × Minotaur class (14,600 tons, 23 kn.); 4 × 9.2-in., 2 × 7.5-in.: 2 × Warrior class (12,590 tons, 23 kn.); 4 × 9.2-in., 5 × 6-in.: 2 × Duke of Edinburgh class (12,590 tons, 23 kn.); 3 × 7.5-in., 3 × 6-in.: HMS Hampshire (10,850 tons, 22 kn.)	
Smaller ships	26 × light cruisers 79 × destroyers (including one destroyer-minelayer)	11 × light cruisers 61 × torpedo boats

British capital ships carried a larger weight of broadside—332,360 lb (150.76 t) compared to 134,216 lb (60.879 t)—than the German ones.

The German Navy's torpedo boats were of similar size and function to the destroyers in the Royal Navy, and are often referred to as such.

=== Losses ===
Losses of the fleets with date of loss
	Pre-dreadnought battleships	Battlecruisers	Armoured cruisers	Light cruisers	Destroyers / Torpedo boats
Royal Navy		HMS Invincible (31 May); HMS Queen Mary (31 May); HMS Indefatigable (31 May)	HMS Defence (31 May); HMS Warrior (1 June); HMS Black Prince (1 June)		3 (31 May); 5 (1 June)
Imperial German Navy	SMS Pommern (1 June)	SMS Lützow (1 June)		SMS Frauenlob (31 May); SMS Rostock (1 June); SMS Elbing (1 June); SMS Wiesbaden (1 June)	3 (31 May); 2 (1 June)

== Abbreviations ==
Officers killed in action are indicated thus: †

Abbreviations for officers’ ranks (German ranks translated according to current NATO practice) (Note: In the First World War, German officers ranks were slightly higher in status: both Kapitän zur See and Fregattenkapitän were considered equivalent to a Captain in the Royal Navy; Korvettenkapitän was equivalent to a RN Commander; and Kapitänleutnant and Oberleutnant zur See to an RN Lieutenant (there was no German equivalent of a RN Lieutenant-Commander). To avoid ambiguities (e.g. "Capt" could mean Kapitän zur See or Fregattenkapitän), the NATO system is employed.):

Adm / Admiral
VAdm / Vice-admiral : Vizeadmiral / VAdm
RAdm / Rear-admiral : Konteradmiral / KAdm
Cdre / Commodore : Kommodore / Kom
Capt / Captain : Kapitän zur See / KptzS
Cdr / Commander : Fregattenkapitän / FKpt
Lt Cdr / Lieutenant-commander : Korvettenkapitän / KKpt
Lt / Lieutenant : Kapitänleutnant / KptLt
SLt / Sub-lieutenant : Oberleutnant zur See / OLtzS

Other abbreviations

Frhr:Freiherr / title in the Prussian nobility equivalent to Baron)
SMS: Seiner Majestät Schiff / German; translation: His Majesty's Ship)
the Hon.: The Honourable

== Royal Navy ==
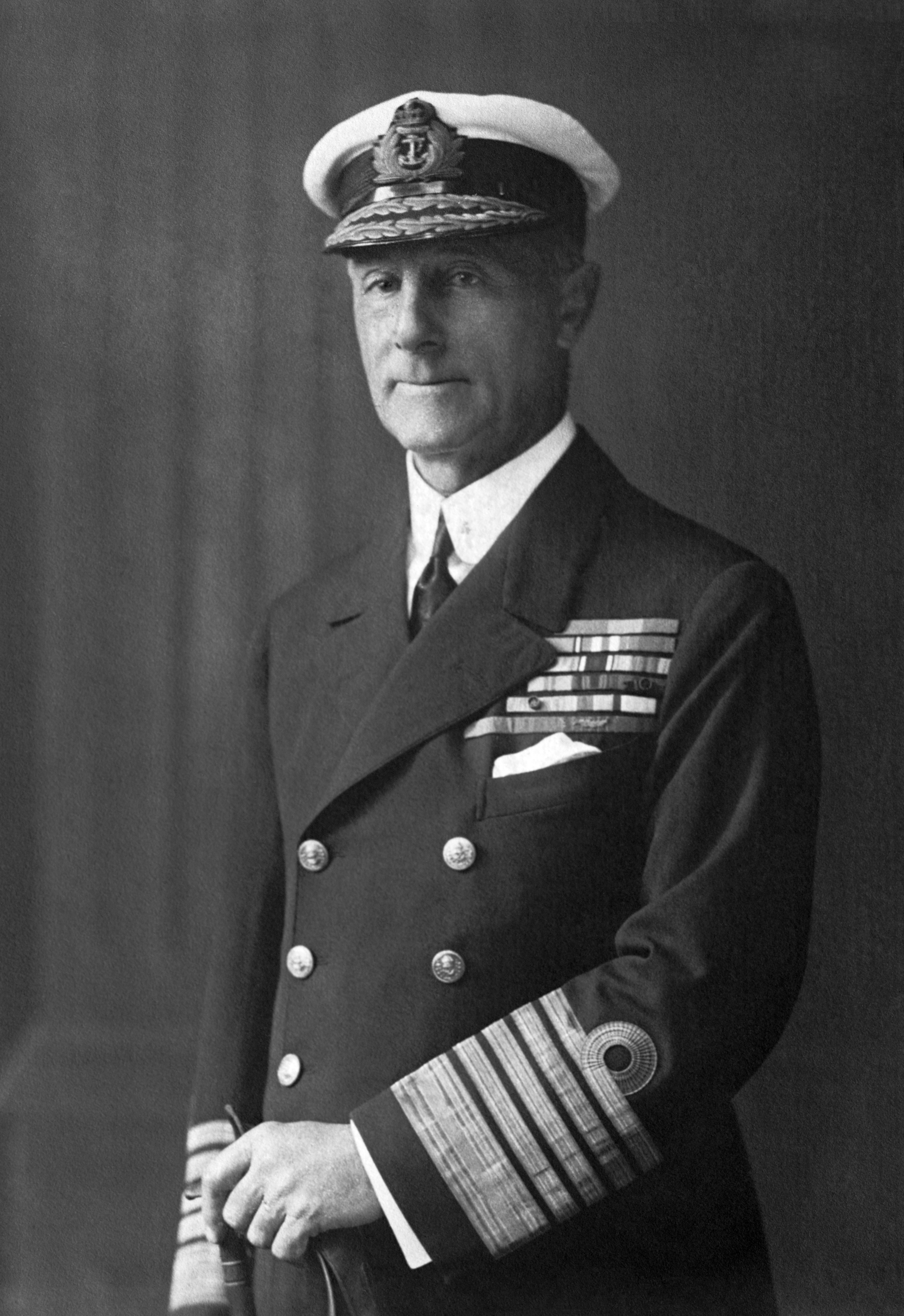
Admiral Sir John R. Jellicoe

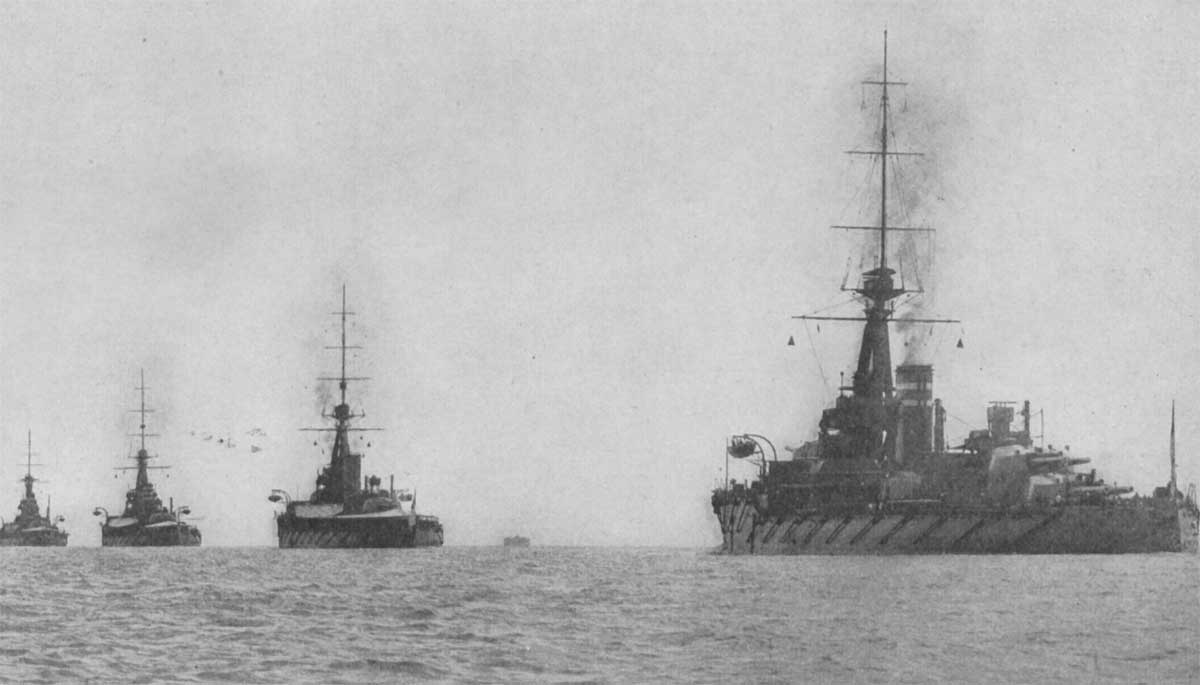
The dreadnoughts King George V, Thunderer, Monarch, and Conqueror of the 2nd Battle Squadron in 1914

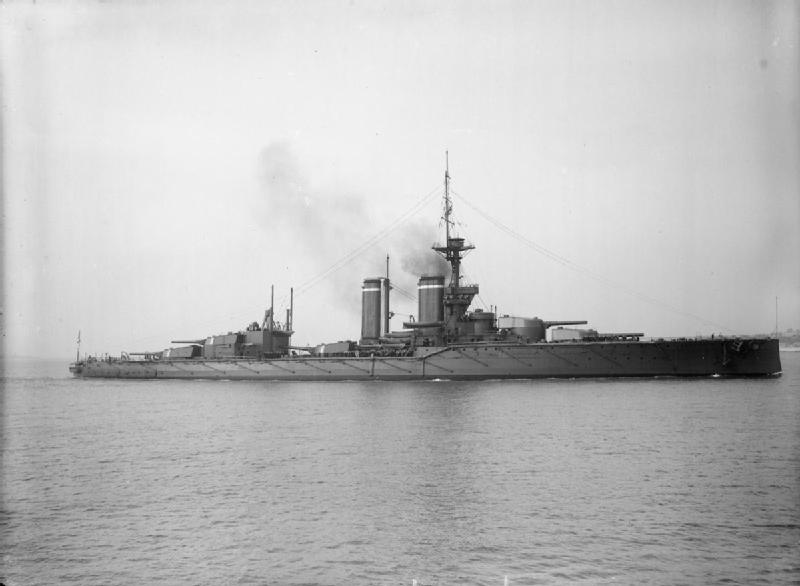
Battleship King George V, at anchor

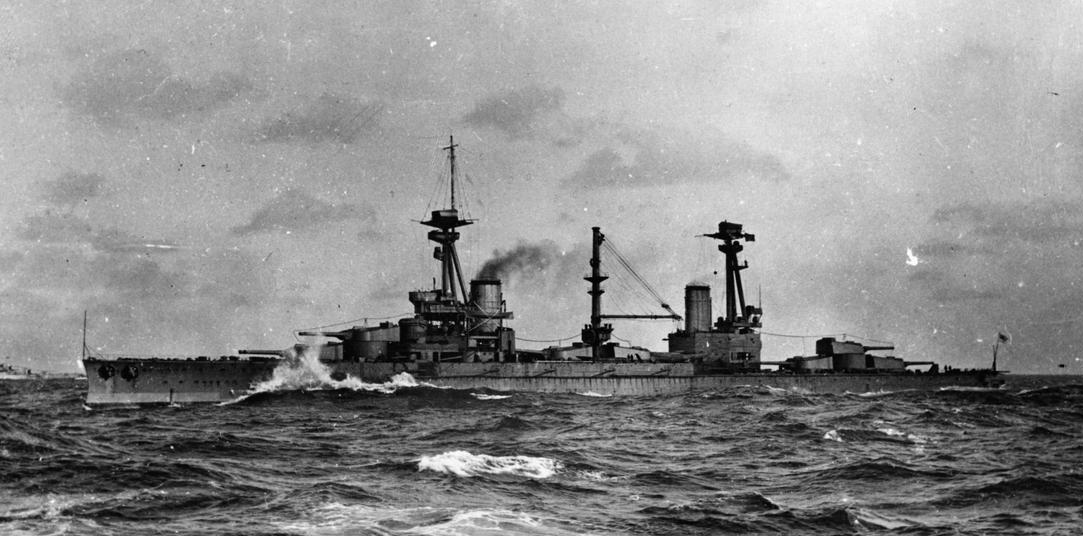
The battleship Agincourt was originally under construction in UK for the Brazilian Navy but then bought by the Ottoman Empire; at the start of the war it was taken into service with the Royal Navy.

=== Grand Fleet ===
Began sortie from Scapa Flow 9.30pm 28 May
The Grand Fleet was the main body of the British Home Fleets in 1916, based at Scapa Flow in the Orkney Islands and Invergordon on the Cromarty Firth in Scotland. (Note: 2nd Battle Squadron, 1st Cruiser Squadron and most of the 11th Destroyer Flotilla were at Invergordon, the remainder at Scapa Flow.)

Commander-in-chief, Grand Fleet: Admiral Sir John Jellicoe, KCB KCVO in HMS Iron Duke
Second in Command, Grand Fleet: Vice-Admiral Sir Cecil Burney, KCB KCMG in HMS Marlborough

Chief of Staff: Vice-Admiral Sir Charles Madden, KCB CVO
Captain of the Fleet: Commodore Lionel Halsey, C.B., C.M.G., AdC.
Master of the Fleet: Captain Oliver Leggett

==== Battleships ====
2nd Battle Squadron (battleships) (Note: Based at Cromarty Firth.)

Vice-Admiral Sir Thomas Martyn Jerram
Sortied from Cromarty Firth; rendezvoused with Jellicoe's force around noon 31 May
1st Division: Vice-Admiral Jerram

HMS King George V (flagship): Capt Frederick Field
HMS Ajax: Capt George Henry Baird
HMS Centurion: Capt Michael Culme-Seymour
HMS Erin: Capt the Hon. Victor Stanley

2nd Division: Rear Admiral Arthur Leveson

HMS Orion (flagship): Capt Oliver Backhouse
HMS Monarch: Capt George Borrett
HMS Conqueror: Capt Hugh Tothill
HMS Thunderer: Capt James Fergusson

Fleet Flagship (at head of 3rd Division but not part of 4th Battle Squadron)

HMS Iron Duke: Capt Frederic Charles Dreyer

4th Battle Squadron (battleships)

Vice-Admiral Sir Frederick Charles Doveton Sturdee, 1st Baronet
3rd Division: (Note: Did not sail: HMS Emperor of India: Capt Charles Royds, the usual flagship of RAdm A. L. Duff, which was in dock.) RAdm Alexander Duff

HMS Royal Oak: Capt Crawford Maclachlan
HMS Superb (flagship): Capt Edmond Hyde Parker
HMS Canada: Capt William Nicholson

4th Division: VAdm Sturdee

HMS Benbow (flagship): Capt Henry Wise Parker
HMS Bellerophon: Capt Edward Francis Bruen
HMS Temeraire: Capt Edwin Veale Underhill
HMS Vanguard: Capt James Douglas Dick

1st Battle Squadron (battleships) (Note: Except HMS Royal Sovereign (Capt. A. T. Hunt), which was still working up and did not sail with squadron.)

Vice-Admiral Sir Cecil Burney
Chief of Staff: Commodore Percy Grant
5th Division: Rear Admiral Ernest Gaunt

HMS Colossus (flagship): Capt Dudley Pound
HMS Collingwood: Capt James Clement Ley
HMS St. Vincent: Capt William Wordsworth Fisher
HMS Neptune Capt Vivian Bernard

6th Division: VAdm Burney

HMS Marlborough (flagship): Capt George Parish Ross
HMS Revenge: Capt Edward Buxton Kiddle
HMS Hercules: Capt Lewis Clinton-Baker
HMS Agincourt: Capt Henry Montagu Doughty

==== Cruisers ====
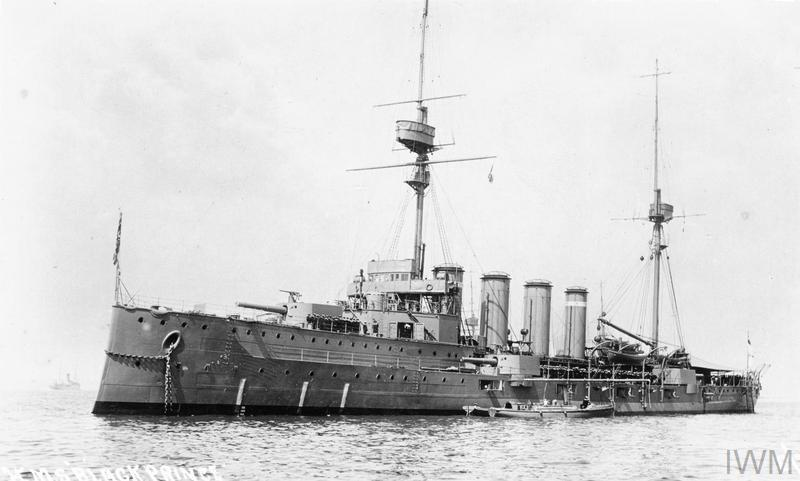
The armoured cruiser Black Prince was lost with all hands the night of 31 May–1 June

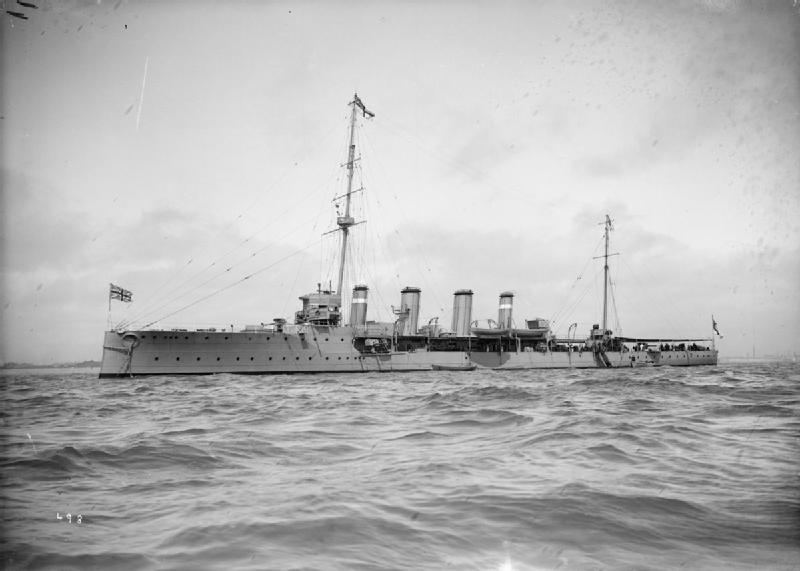
The light cruiser Boadicea at anchor

1st Cruiser Squadron (armoured cruisers) (Note: Based at Cromarty Firth)
Rear-Admiral Sir Robert Arbuthnot, 4th Baronet †

- HMS Defence (sunk 31 May) (flagship): Capt Stanley Venn Ellis †
- HMS Warrior (sunk 1 June): Capt Vincent Barkly Molteno
- HMS Duke of Edinburgh: Capt Henry Blackett
- HMS Black Prince (sunk 1 June): Capt Thomas Parry Bonham †

2nd Cruiser Squadron (armoured cruisers) (Note: The 2nd Cruiser Squadron had just absorbed Minotaur, Hampshire and Donegal from the disbanded 7th Cruiser Squadron on 30 May 1916. Did not sail: HMS Achilles (Captain F. M. Leake) which was in dock, and HMS Donegal (Capt. W. H. D'Oyly) which was on convoy escort duties in the Atlantic)

Rear-Admiral Herbert Heath

- HMS Minotaur (flagship): Capt Arthur Cloudesley Shovel Hughes D'Aeth (Note: The Navy List over 1914–1923, and the London Gazette in 1916 (announcing his CB) give his name as "Cloudesley Shovel" but earlier and later editions of the Navy List, his service record, and some editions of the London Gazette give it "Cloudesly Shovel" and the probate records for England and Wales have "Cloudesley Shovell". His obituary in The Times gives his name as Arthur Cloudesley Shovel Hughes-D'Aeth)
- HMS Hampshire: Capt Herbert John Savill
- HMS Shannon: Capt John Saumarez Dumaresq
- HMS Cochrane: Capt Eustace La Trobe Leatham

4th Light Cruiser Squadron

Commodore Charles Edward Le Mesurier

- HMS Calliope: Commodore Le Mesurier
- HMS Constance: Capt Cyril Samuel Townsend
- HMS Comus: Capt Alan Hotham
- HMS Caroline: Capt Henry Crooke
- HMS Royalist: Capt the Hon. Herbert Meade

Light cruisers attached for repeating visual signals

- HMS Boadicea: Capt Louis Charles Stirling Woollcombe (attached to 2nd B.S.)
- HMS Active: Capt Percy Withers (attached to Fleet Flagship)
- HMS Blanche: Capt John Casement (attached to 4th B.S.)
- HMS Bellona: Capt Arthur Brandreth Scott Dutton (attached to 1st B.S.)

Other ships under direct command of the Commander-in-Chief (Note: These did not form part of the line of battle; Abdiel was attached for tactical minelaying and Oak as a tender to the flagship. In addition the seaplane carrier HMS Campania: Capt Oliver Schwann sailed from Scapa Flow at 0130 hrs, 31 May, but was too slow to catch the fleet and was ordered to return at 04:30 hrs 31 May; and the kite balloon tender HMS Menelaus, Cdr C. W. N. McCulloch, did not sail)

- HMS Abdiel: Cdr Berwick Curtis (fast minelayer)
- HMS Oak: Lt Cdr Douglas Faviell (tender to the flagship of the Grand Fleet)

==== Destroyers ====
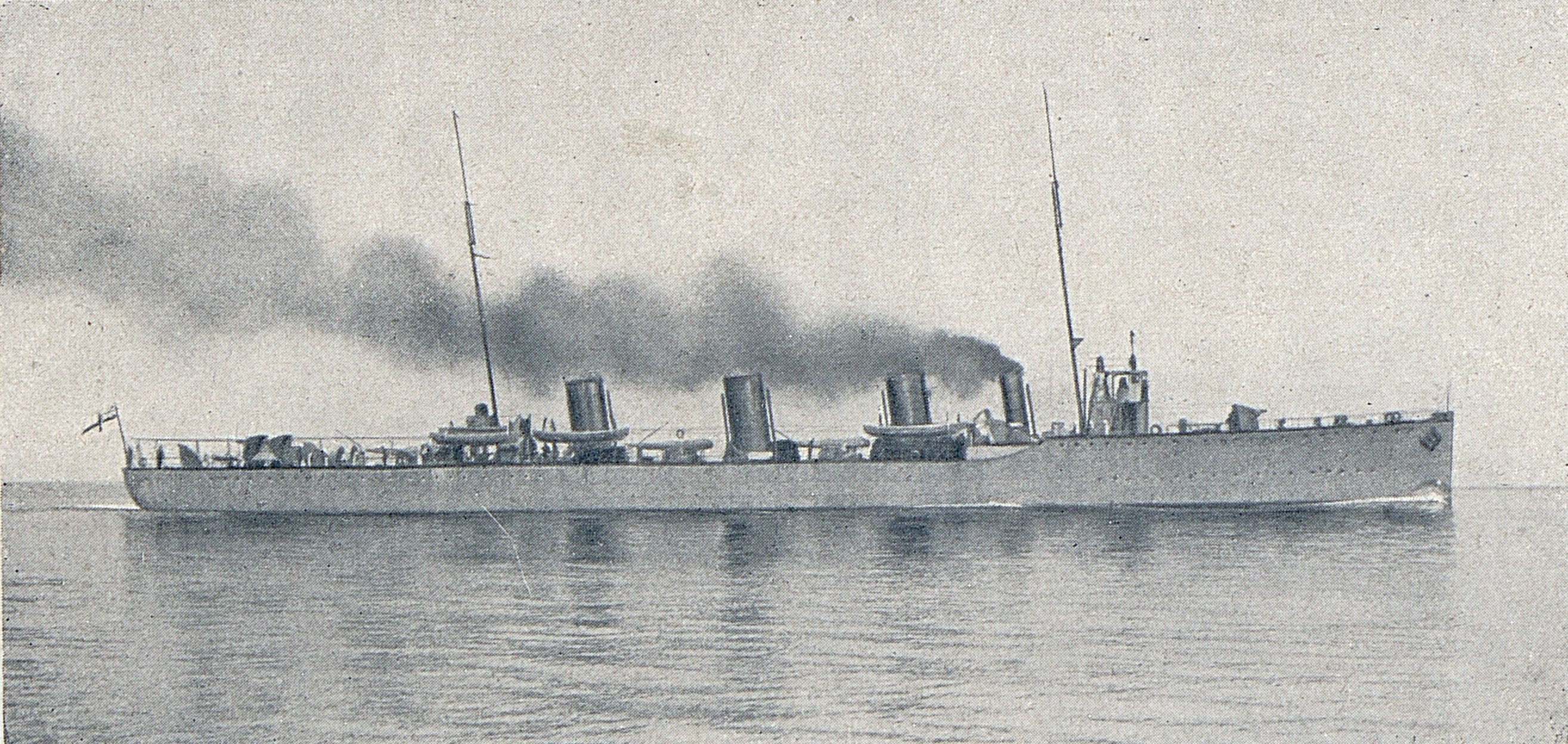
The Faulknor-class flotilla leader (a larger destroyer) Tipperary was sunk on the night of 31 May–1 June taking 150 crew and flotilla captain John Wintour

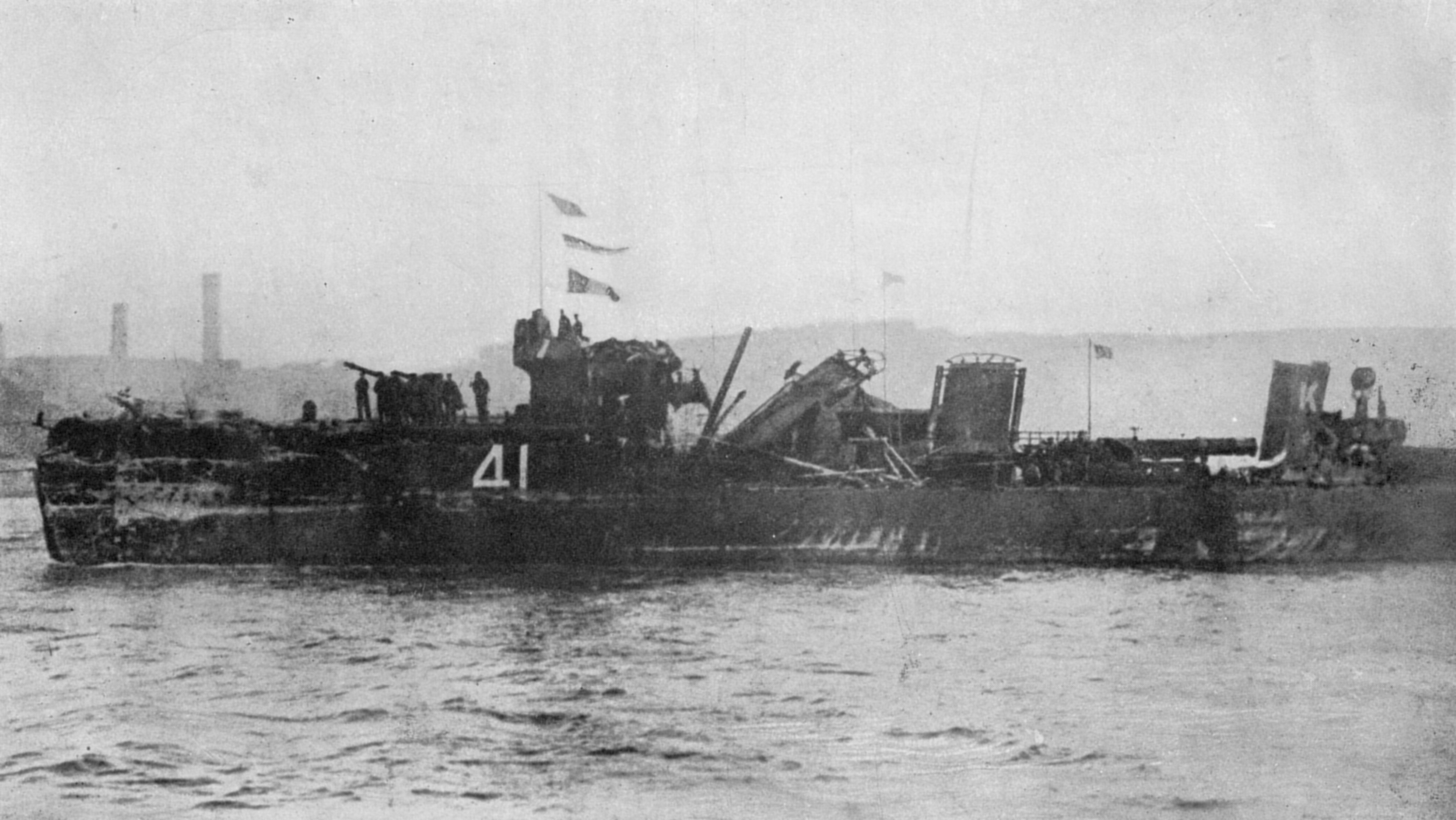
Acasta-class destroyer Spitfire after having been rammed by the German battleship Nassau during the Battle of Jutland

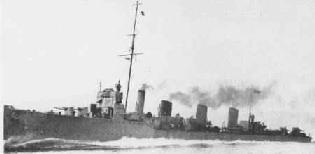
Faulknor-class flotilla leader Broke at speed

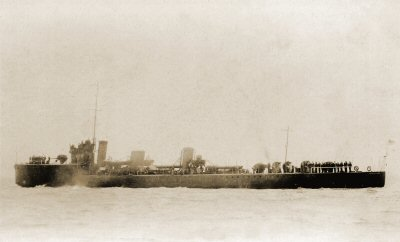
Destroyer Ambuscade

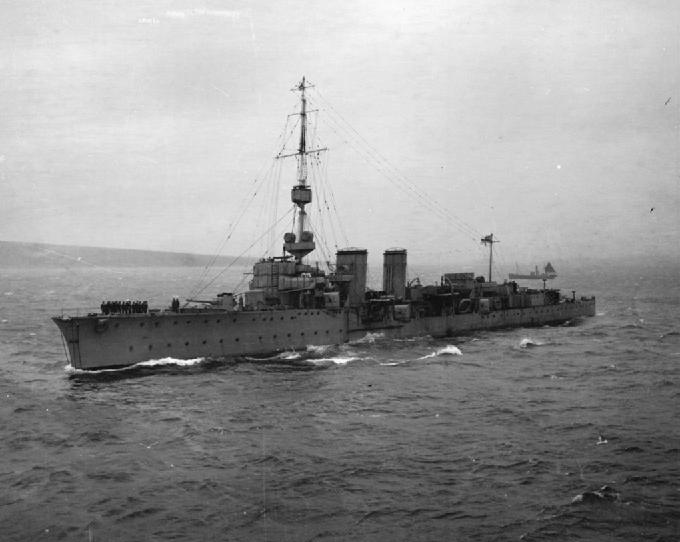
C-class (Cambrian subclass) light cruiser Castor

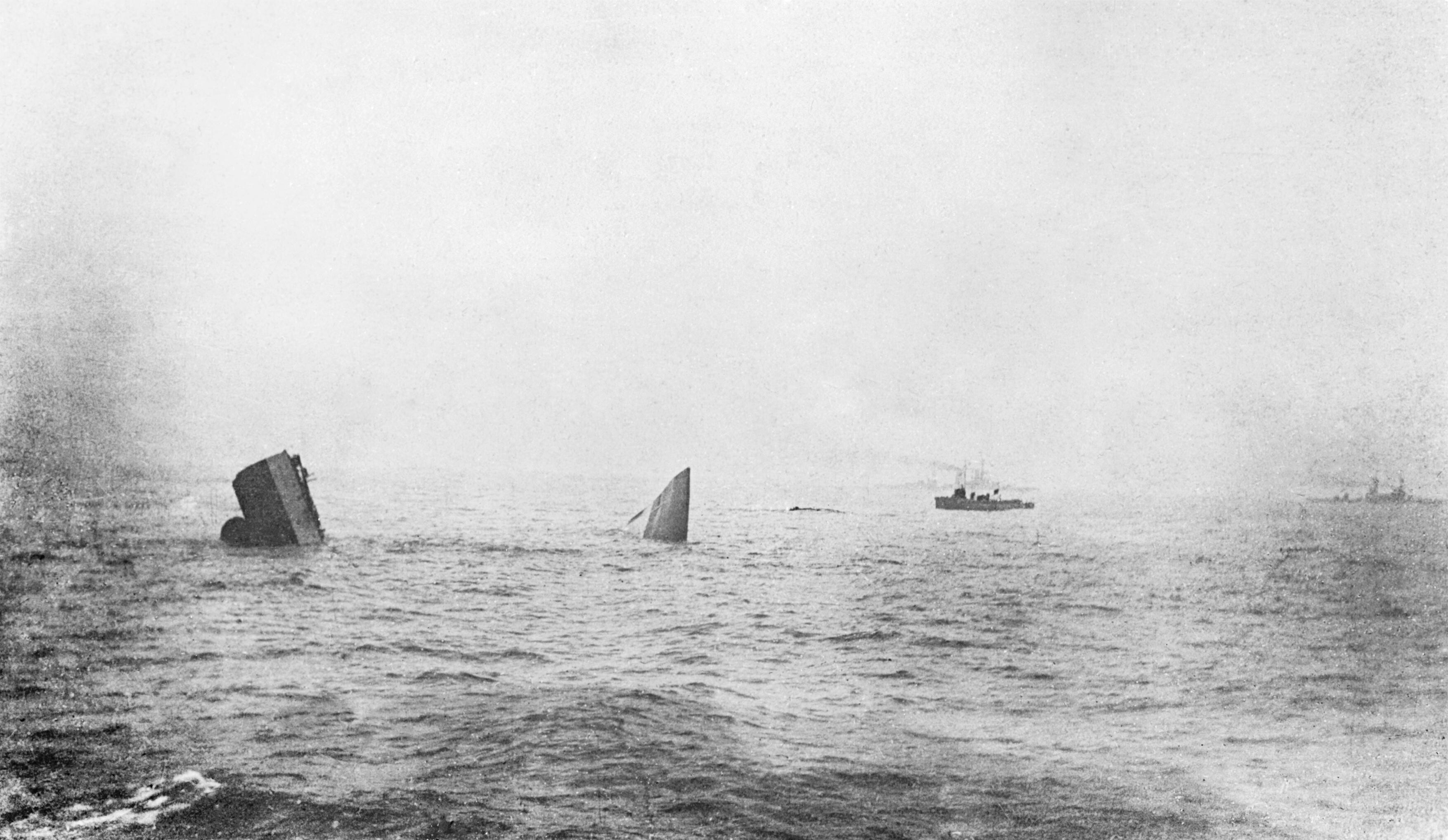
The bow and stern of the battlecruiser Invincible standing upright on the bed of the North Sea after exploding during the Battle of Jutland. Rear Admiral Hood and her captain were killed along with the crew.

4th Destroyer Flotilla (Note: Three ships of the flotilla did not sail: Cockatrice and Paragon (both in refit) and HMS Victor.)

Captain Charles John Wintour †
HMS Tipperary (Faulknor-class flotilla leader, sunk 1 June) : Capt Wintour †

- First half-flotilla / 4th D.F.
  - HMS Spitfire: Lt Cdr Clarence Walter Eyre Trelawney
  - HMS Sparrowhawk (scuttled 1 June following collision): Lt Cdr Sydney Hopkins
  - HMS Garland: Lt Cdr Reginald Stannus Goff
  - HMS Contest: Lt Cdr Ernald Gilbert Hoskins Master
- Second half-flotilla / 4th D.F.
  - HMS Broke (Faulknor-class flotilla leader): Cdr Walter Lingen Allen
  - 3rd Division / 4th D.F.
    - HMS Porpoise: Cdr Hugh Davenport Colville
    - HMS Unity: Lt Cdr Arthur Macaulay Lecky
  - 4th Division / 4th D.F.
    - HMS Achates: Cdr Reginald Becher Caldwell Hutchinson, D.S.C.
    - HMS Ambuscade: Lt Cdr Gordon Alston Coles
    - HMS Ardent (sunk 1 June): Lt Cdr Arthur Marsden
    - HMS Fortune (sunk 1 June): Lt Cdr Frank Goodrich Terry †

11th Destroyer Flotilla (Note: Based at Cromarty Firth except for HMS Marne, Manners, Michael and Mons at Scapa Flow. Did not sail: Musketeer (refit) and Marmion (refit).)

Commanded by Commodore Hawksley in HMS Castor, a light cruiser

- First half-flotilla / 11th D.F.
  - 1st Division / 11th D.F.
    - HMS Ossory: Cdr Harold Victor Dundas
    - HMS Martial: Lt Cdr Julian Harrison
    - HMS Magic: Lt Cdr Gerald Charles Wynter
    - HMS Minion: Lt Cdr Henry Clive Rawlings
  - 2nd Division / 11th D.F.
    - HMS Mystic: Cdr Claud Finlinson Allsup
    - HMS Mons: Lt Cdr Robert Makin
    - HMS Mandate: Lt Cdr Edward McConnell Wyndham Lawrie
    - HMS Michael: Lt Cdr Claude Lindsay Bate
- Second half-flotilla/11th D.F.

HMS Kempenfelt (Marksman-class flotilla leader): Cdr Harold Ernest Sulivan

  - 3rd Division / 11th D.F.
    - HMS Marne: Lt Cdr George Bibby Hartford
    - HMS Milbrook: Lt Charles Granville Naylor
    - HMS Manners: Lt Cdr Gerald Harrison
  - 4th Division / 11th D.F.
    - HMS Moon: Cdr (Acting) William Dion Irvin
    - HMS Mounsey: Lt Cdr Ralph Vincent Eyre
    - HMS Morning Star: Lt Cdr Hugh Undecimus Fletcher

12th Destroyer Flotilla (Note: Did not sail: Mameluke (refit, Glasgow) and Napier (refit, Glasgow); also HMS Mischief assigned to Group 8/4th D.F.)

Captain Anselan John Buchanan Stirling
HMS Faulknor (Faulknor-class flotilla leader): Capt Stirling

- First half-flotilla / 12th D.F.
  - 1st Division / 12th D.F.
    - HMS Obedient: Cdr George William McOran Campbell
    - HMS Mindful: Lt Cdr John Jackson Cuthbert Ridley
    - HMS Marvel: Lt Cdr Reginald Watkins Grubb
    - HMS Onslaught: Lt Cdr Arthur Gerald Onslow †
  - 2nd Division / 12th D.F.
    - HMS Maenad: Cdr John Pelham Champion
    - HMS Narwhal: Lt Cdr Henry Victor Hudson
    - HMS Nessus: Lt Cdr Eric Quentin Carter
    - HMS Noble: Lt Cdr Henry Percy Boxer
- Second half-flotilla / 12th D.F.: Cdr Norton Allen Sulivan
  - HMS Marksman (Marksman-class flotilla leader): Cdr Norton Allen Sulivan
  - HMS Opal: Cdr Charles Geoffrey Coleridge Sumner
  - HMS Nonsuch: Lt Cdr Herbert Inglis Nigel Lyon
  - HMS Menace: Lt Cdr Charles Astley Poignand
  - HMS Munster: Lt Cdr Spencer Francis Russell
  - HMS Mary Rose: Lt Cdr Edwin Anderson Homan

Group 8 (Note: Four destroyers detached from the 4th and 12th Destroyer Flotillas as escorts for the 2nd Cruiser Squadron.)

- HMS Owl: Cdr Robert Gerald Hamond (from 4th D.F.)
- HMS Hardy: Cdr Richard Anthony Aston Plowden (from 4th D.F.)
- HMS Mischief: Lt Cdr the Hon. Cyril Augustus Ward (from 4th D.F.)
- HMS Midge: Lt Cdr James Robert Carnegie Cavendish (from 4th D.F.)

==== 3rd Battle Cruiser Squadron ====
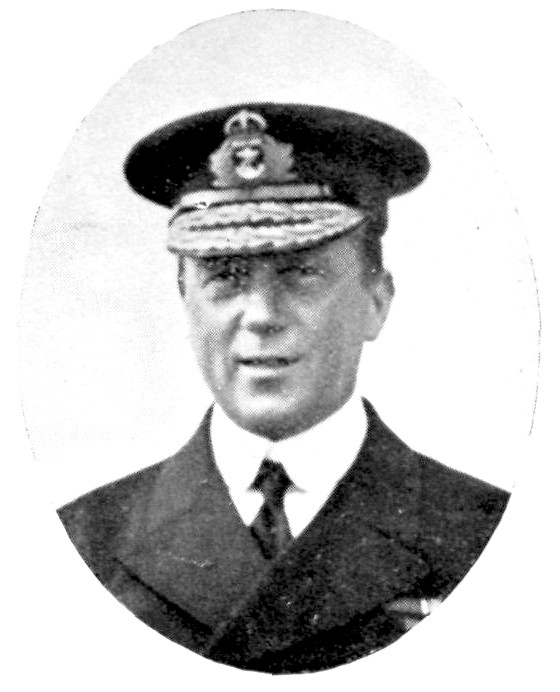
Rear Admiral Hood, commander of the 3rd Battle Cruiser Squadron, was killed during the battle along with all but six of the crew when HMS Invincible exploded

This squadron, temporarily attached to the Grand Fleet from the Battle Cruiser Fleet, was stationed ahead of the main body, with the intention that it join Beatty when the action began.
Rear-Admiral The Hon. Horace Hood, †

- Battlecruisers
  - HMS Invincible (sunk 31 May) (flagship): Capt Arthur Lindesay Cay †
  - HMS Inflexible: Capt Edward Heaton-Ellis
  - HMS Indomitable: Capt Francis William Kennedy
- Accompanying cruisers
  - HMS Canterbury : (Note: Attached from 5th Light Cruiser Squadron of the Harwich Force.) Capt Percy Royds
  - HMS Chester : (Note: Attached from 3rd Light Cruiser Squadron.) Capt Robert Neale Lawson
- Attached destroyers (Note: all I-class destroyers, except Ophelia, attached from 4th Destroyer Flotilla.)
  - HMS Shark (sunk 31 May): Cdr Loftus William Jones (KIA)
  - HMS Ophelia: Cdr Lewis Gonne Eyre Crabbe (Admiralty M-class destroyer)
  - HMS Christopher: Lt Cdr Fairfax Moresby Kerr
  - HMS Acasta: Lt Cdr John Ouchterlony Barron

=== Battle Cruiser Fleet ===
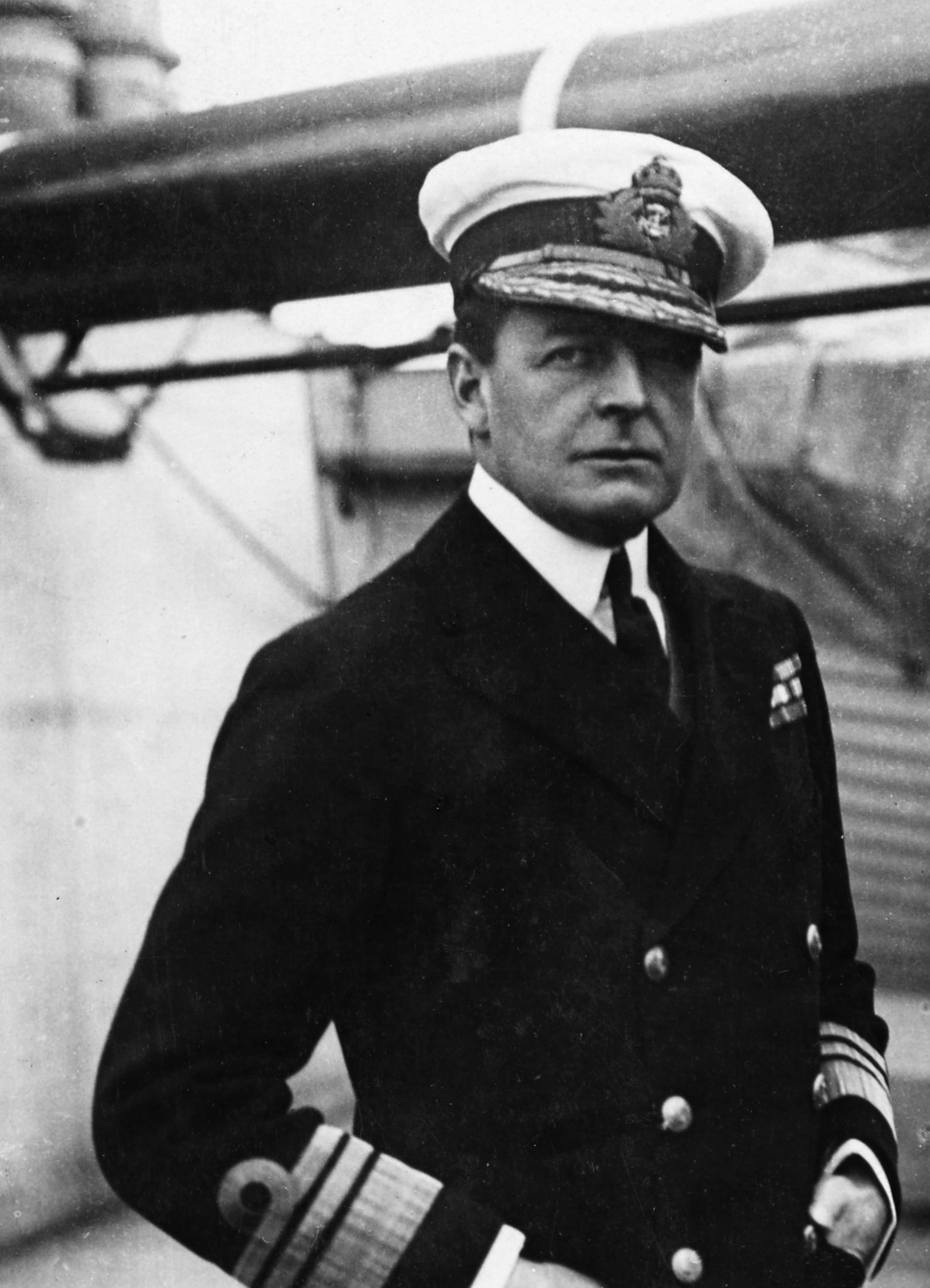
VAdm Sir David R. Beatty

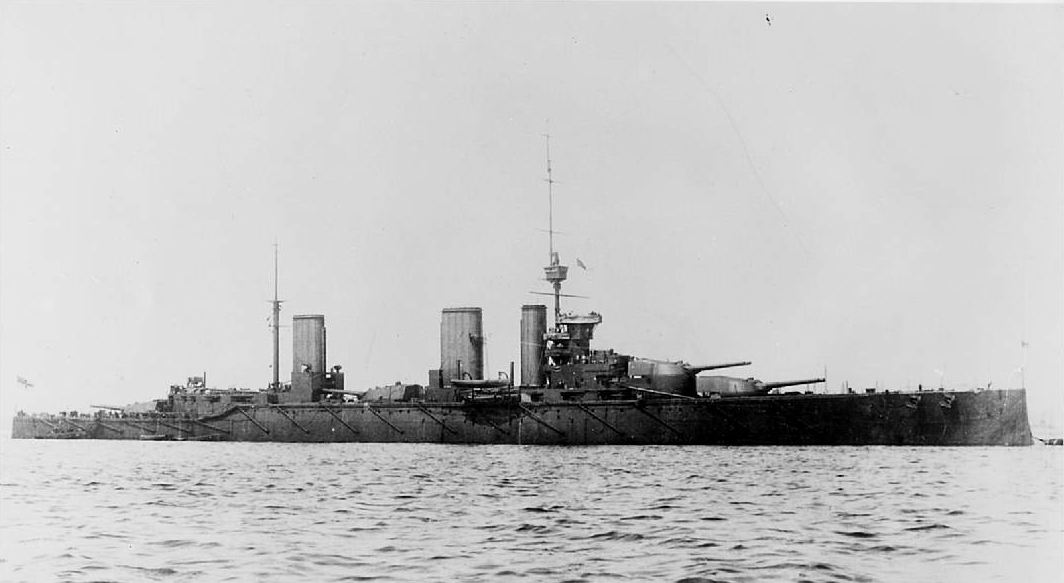
Battlecruiser Lion, VAdm Beatty's flagship, heavily damaged at the Battle of Jutland

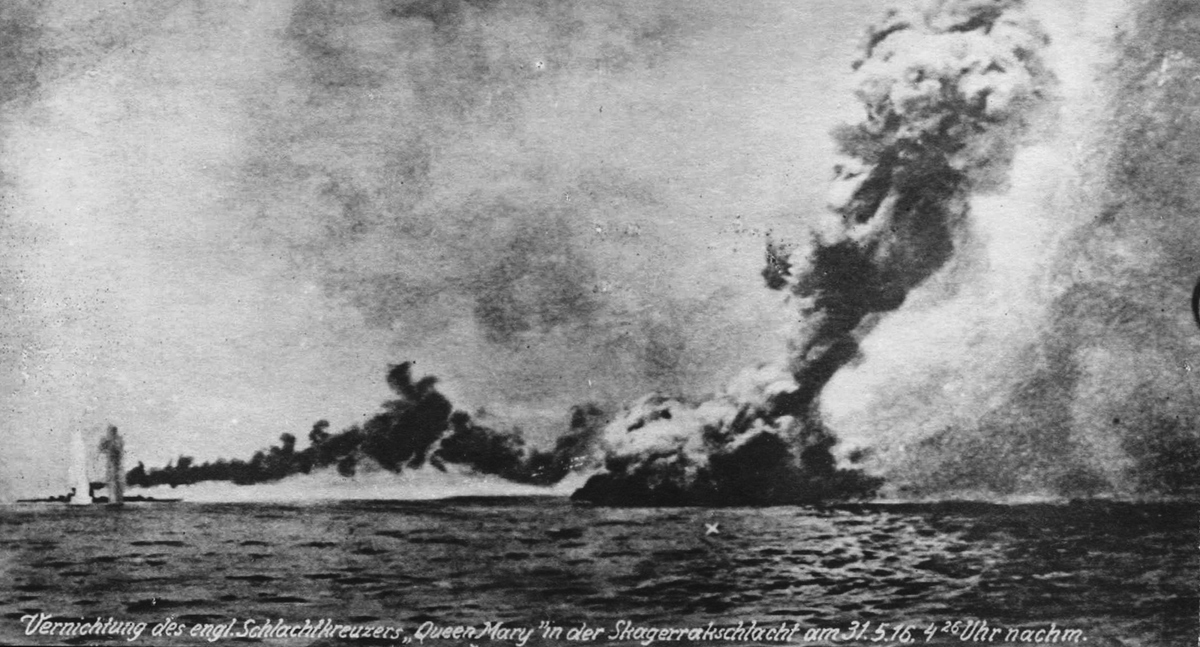
Battlecruiser Queen Mary exploding, 31 May 1916

This force of high-speed ships was subordinate to the Commander in Chief of the Grand Fleet, but operated independently as an advanced guard, intended to reconnoiter the enemy fleet and to engage enemy scouting forces. At its core were six battlecruisers, accompanied by 13 light cruisers, and escorted by 18 destroyers and an early aircraft carrier. (Note: Also known at different times during the war as Cruiser Force A, and the Battle Cruiser Force. At the time of Jutland, British battle cruisers were organized in three squadrons of three ships each, plus a fleet flagship. One of these Squadrons, the 3rd, was temporarily detached to the main body of the Grand Fleet. In addition there were three light cruiser squadrons and the 13th Destroyer Flotilla assigned (augmented at Jutland by additional attached destroyers). The Battle Cruiser Fleet was based at Rosyth on the Firth of Forth, Scotland.)
Sortied from Firth of Forth soon after 6.00pm 30 May
Vice-Admiral Sir David Richard Beatty in HMS Lion

Chief of Staff: Capt Rudolph Bentinck

==== Battlecruisers ====
HMS Lion: (flagship) Captain Ernle Chatfield

- 1st Battlecruiser Squadron: Rear Admiral Osmond Brock on Princess Royal
  - HMS Princess Royal (flagship): Capt Walter Cowan,
  - HMS Queen Mary (sunk 31 May): Capt Cecil Prowse (KIA)
  - HMS Tiger: Capt Henry Bertram Pelly.
- 2nd Battlecruiser Squadron: (Note: HMAS Australia, the usual flagship of Rear Admiral Pakenham, was in dock at HMNB Devonport following repairs from a collision with New Zealand in April) Rear Admiral William Pakenham,
  - HMS New Zealand (flagship): Capt John Green
  - HMS Indefatigable (sunk 31 May): Capt Charles Fitzgerald Sowerby (KIA)

==== Light cruisers ====
- 1st Light Cruiser Squadron: Cdre Edwyn Alexander-Sinclair
  - HMS Galatea Cdre Alexander-Sinclair
  - HMS Phaeton: Capt John Cameron
  - HMS Inconstant: Capt Bertram Thesiger
  - HMS Cordelia: Capt Tufton Beamish
- 2nd Light Cruiser Squadron: Cdre William Goodenough
  - HMS Southampton: Cdre Goodenough
  - HMS Birmingham: Capt Arthur Duff
  - HMS Nottingham: Capt Charles Blois Miller
  - HMS Dublin: Capt Albert Charles Scott
- 3rd Light Cruiser Squadron: Rear Admiral Trevylyan Napier
  - HMS Falmouth (flagship): Capt John Douglas Edwards
  - HMS Yarmouth: Capt Thomas Drummond Pratt
  - HMS Birkenhead: Capt Edward Reeves
  - HMS Gloucester: Capt William Frederick Blunt

Attached to the light cruisers was the seaplane tender HMS Engadine (Lt Cdr Charles Gwillim Robinson) carrying two Short Type 184 reconnaissance seaplanes and two Sopwith Baby fighter seaplanes.

==== Destroyers ====
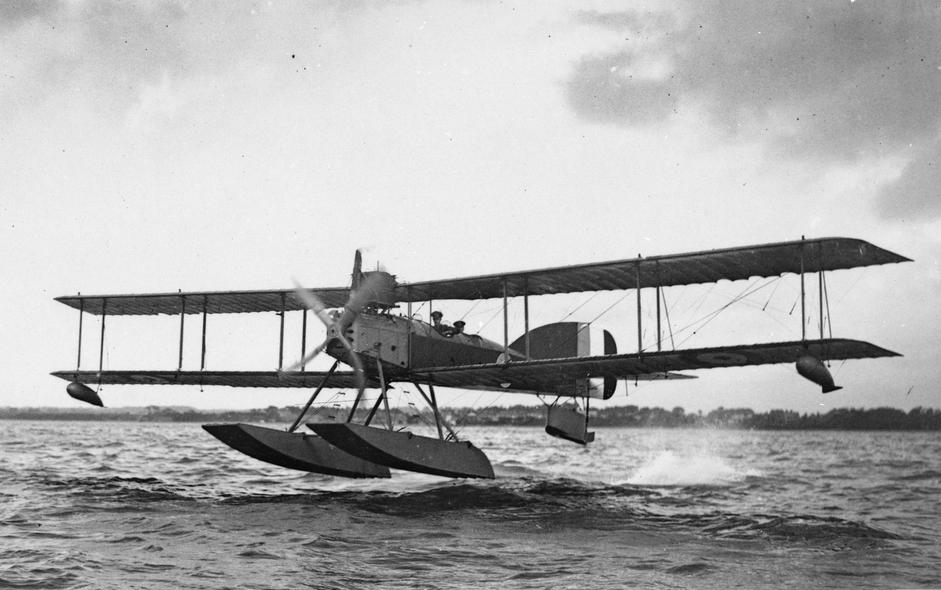
Short Type 184 scout plane, the only British aircraft to take part in the Battle of Jutland

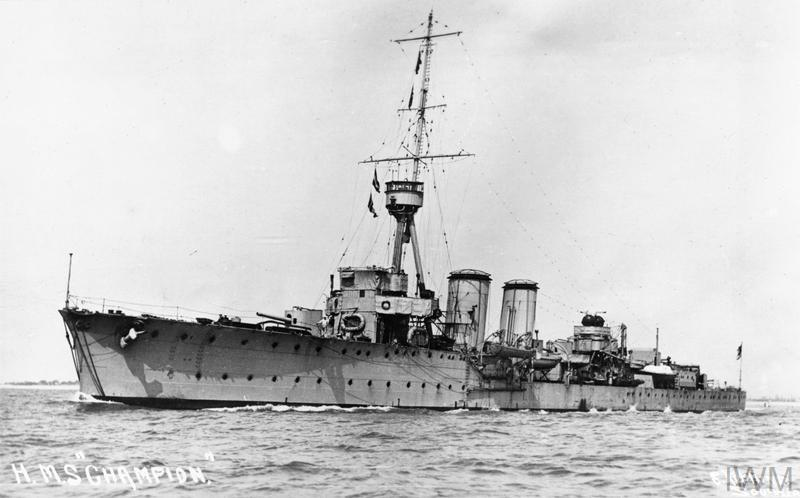
Light cruiser Champion

13th Destroyer Flotilla (Note: Did not sail: HMS Negro, HMS Nepean, HMS Nereus, HMS Paladin, Penn and HMS Pigeon.)
Captain James Uchtred Farie

HMS Champion (light cruiser): Capt Farie

1st Division / 13th D.F.

HMS Obdurate: Lt Cdr Cecil Henry Hulton Sams
HMS Nerissa: Lt Cdr Montague George Bentinck Legge
HMS Termagant: Lt Cdr Cuthbert Patrick Blake (attached from 10th D.F., Harwich Force)
HMS Moresby: Lt Cdr Roger Vincent Alison (detached to escort HMS Engadine)

2nd Division / 13th D.F.

HMS Nestor (sunk 31 May): Cdr the Hon. Edward Bingham
HMS Nomad (sunk 31 May): Lt Cdr Paul Whitfield
HMS Nicator: Lt Jack Ernest Albert Mocatta
HMS Onslow: Lt Cdr John Tovey (detached to escort HMS Engadine)

3rd Division / 13th D.F.

HMS Narborough: Lt Cdr Geoffrey Corlett
HMS Pelican: Lt Cdr Kenneth Adair Beattie
HMS Petard: Lt Cdr Evelyn Thomson
HMS Turbulent (sunk 1 June): (Note: Attached from 10th D.F., Harwich Force) Lt Cdr Dudley Stuart †

Attached Harwich Destroyers (9th Destroyer Flotilla): Cdr Malcolm Lennon Goldsmith (Note: The 9th Destroyer Flotilla was part of the Harwich Force; this group of six destroyers were attached to the Battle Cruiser Fleet at the time of Jutland, and sailed under this designation with the organization given below.)

1st division / 9th D.F.

HMS Lydiard: Cdr Goldsmith
HMS Liberty: Lt Cdr Philip Wilfred Sidney King
HMS Landrail: Lt Cdr Francis Edward Henry Graham Hobart

2nd division / 9th D.F.

HMS Moorsom: Cdr John Coombe Hodgson (from 10th D.F.)
HMS Laurel: Lt Henry Dawson Crawford Stanistreet
HMS Morris: Lt Cdr Edward Sidney Graham (from 10th D.F.)

==== 5th Battle Squadron ====
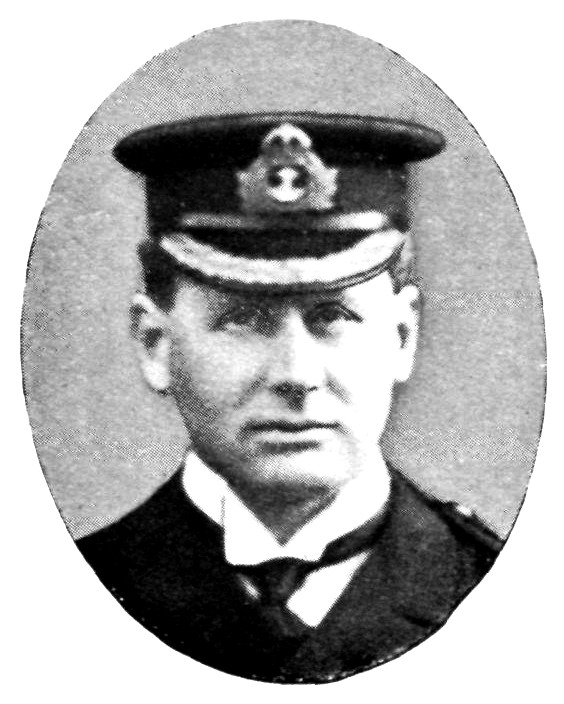
RAdm Hugh Evan-Thomas

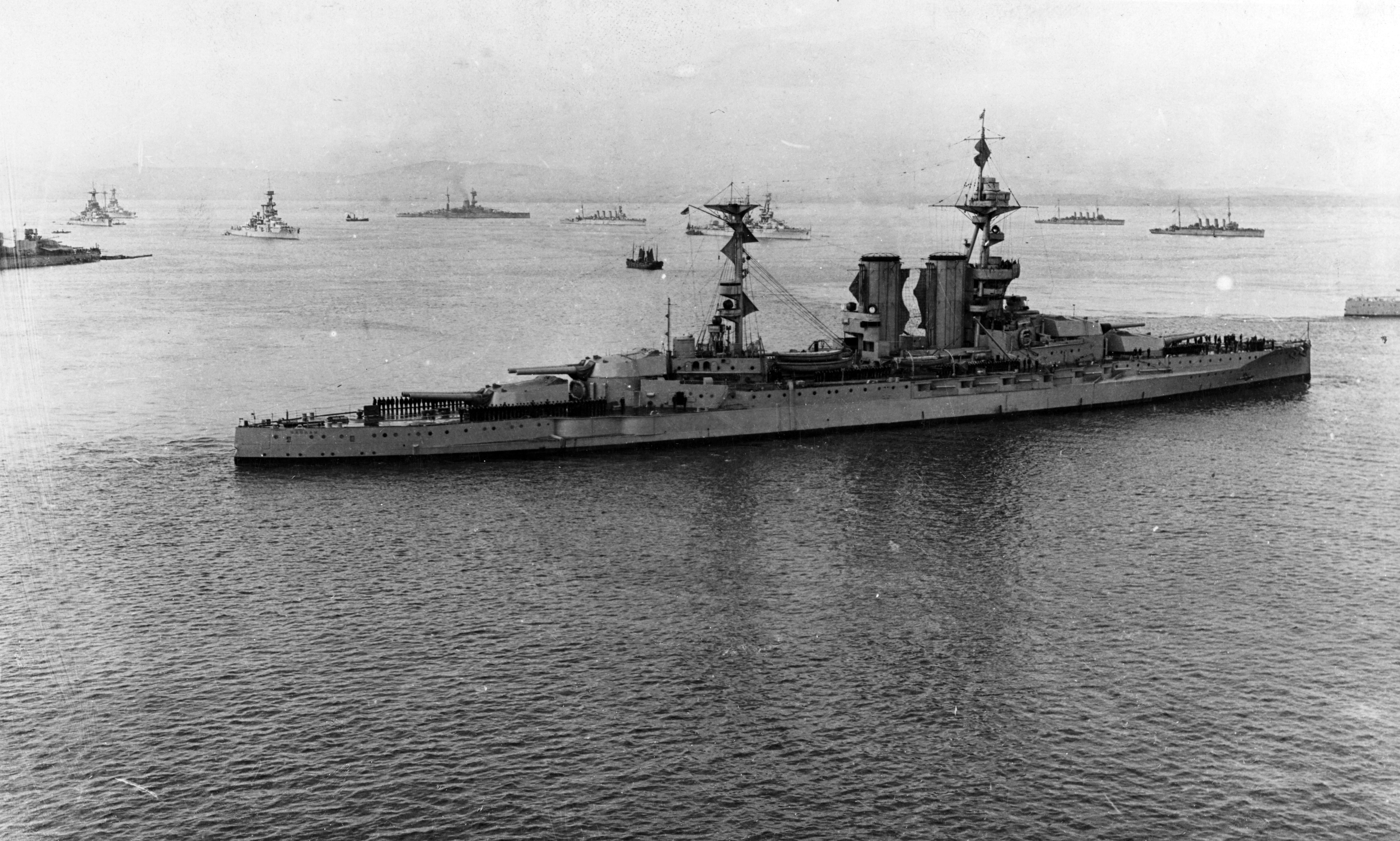
The Queen-Elzaabeth-class battleship Barham, Rear Admiral Evan-Thomas's flagship, at Scapa Flow in 1917

The 5th Battle Squadron was a special unit of fast Queen Elizabeth-class battleships, intended to act as the vanguard of the main battle line. At the Battle of Jutland, it operated with the Battlecruiser Fleet, and was escorted by the 1st Destroyer Flotilla. (Note: HMS Queen Elizabeth: Capt. G. P. W. Hope was being overhauled at Rosyth and did not sail)
Rear-Admiral Hugh Evan-Thomas
Sortied from Firth of Forth with the Battle Cruiser Fleet soon after 6.00pm 30 May

Battleships

HMS Barham (flagship): Capt Arthur William Craig
HMS Valiant: Capt Maurice Woollcombe
HMS Warspite: Capt Edward Montgomery Phillpotts
HMS Malaya: Capt the Hon. Algernon Boyle

1st Destroyer Flotilla (Note: Attached from the Grand Fleet, in company with 5th Battle Squadron. Did not sail: HMS Botha (flotilla leader), HMS Archer, HMS Jackal, Phoenix and HMS Tigress (all refitting); HMS Beaver, HMS Druid, HMS Ferret, HMS Hind, HMS Hornet and Sandfly (all detached to the Nore, as escort to the 3rd Battle Squadron, which was guarding the Thames Estuary against a battlecruiser raid).)

HMS Fearless (light cruiser): Capt Charles Donnison Roper
HMS Defender: Lt Cdr Laurence Reynolds Palmer
1st Division / 1st D.F.

HMS Acheron: Cdr Charles Ramsey
HMS Ariel: Lt Cdr Arthur Grendon Tippet
HMS Attack: Lt Cdr Charles Herbert Neill James
HMS Hydra: Lt Francis George Glossop

2nd Division / 1st D.F.

HMS Badger: Cdr Charles Albert Fremantle
HMS Lizard: Lt Cdr Edward Brooke
HMS Goshawk: Cdr Dashwood Fowler Moir
HMS Lapwing: Lt Cdr Alexander Hugh Gye

== Imperial German Navy ==
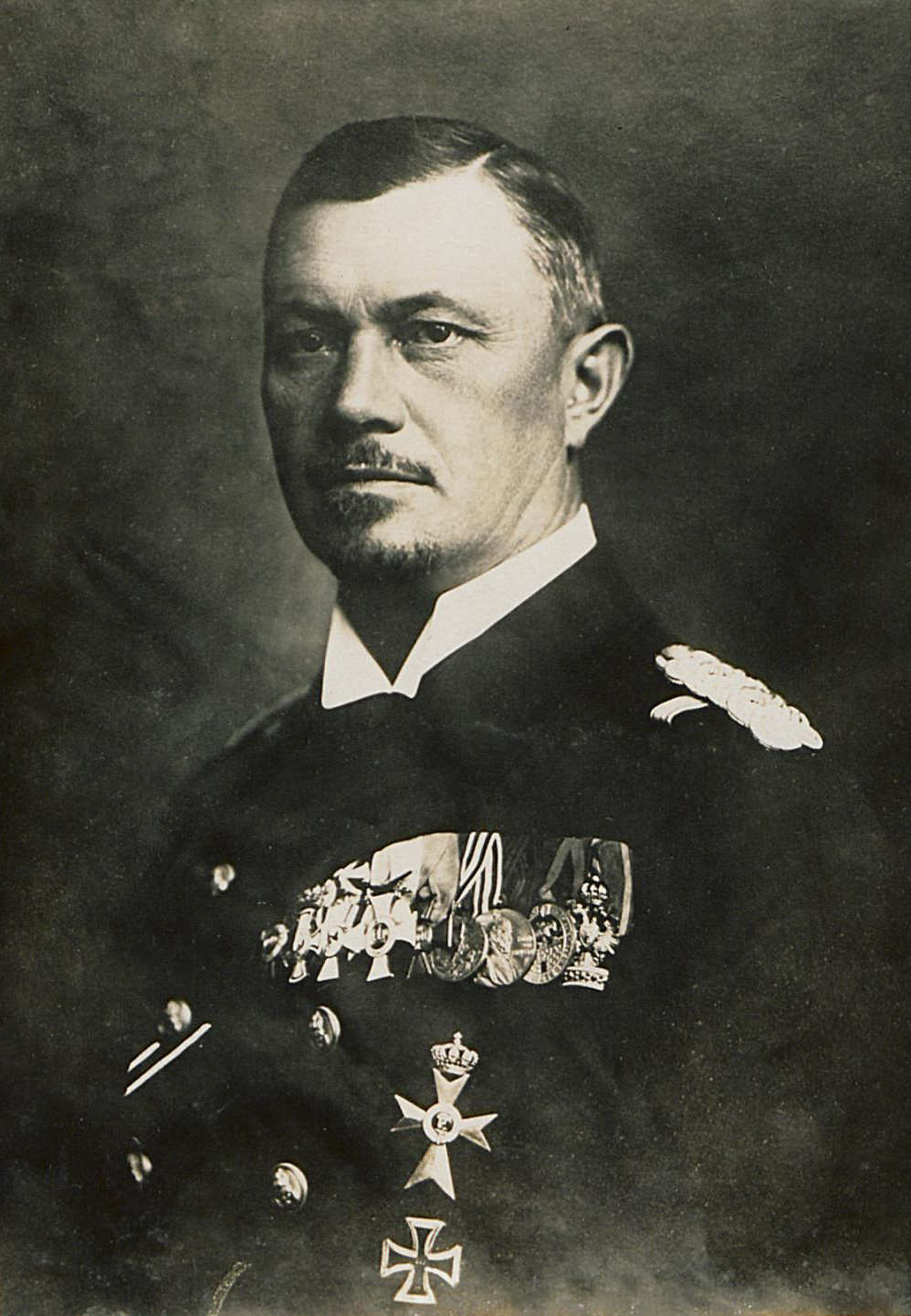
Vizeadmiral Reinhard Scheer

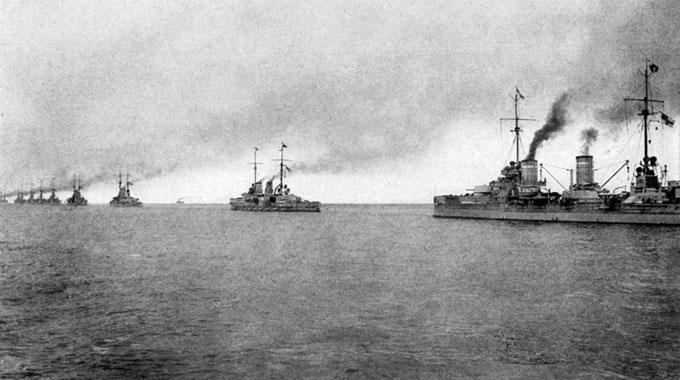
Dreadnoughts of the High Seas Fleet steam in a line of battle

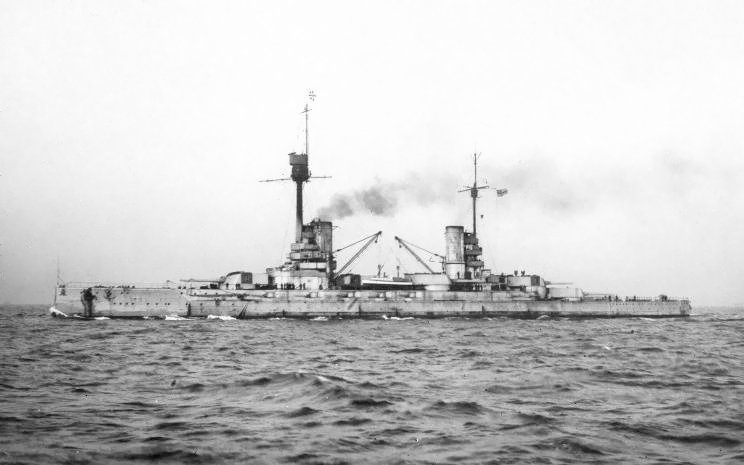
Battleship Friedrich der Grosse, VAdm Scheer's flagship

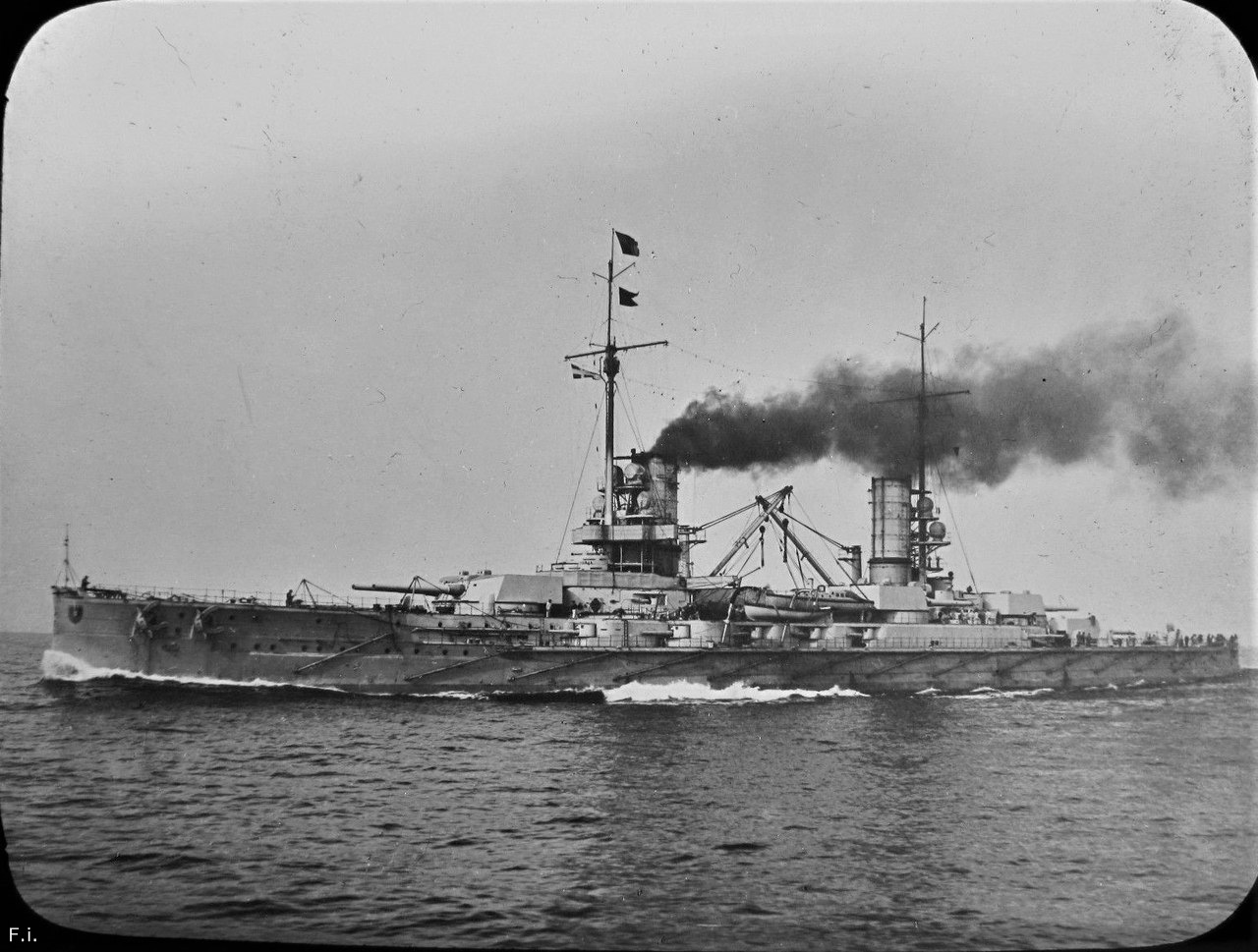
Battleship Kaiser underway

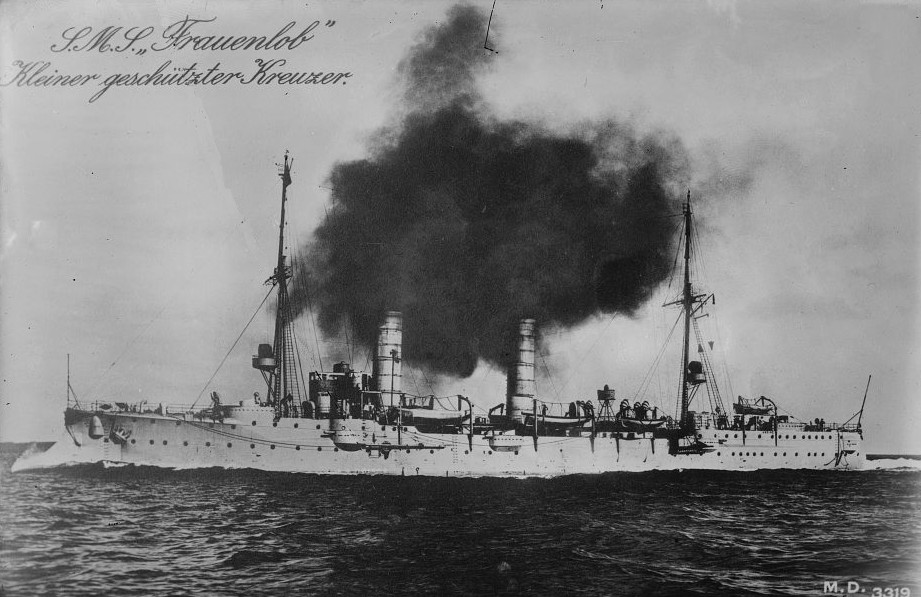
Light cruiser SMS Frauenlob, sunk 31st May

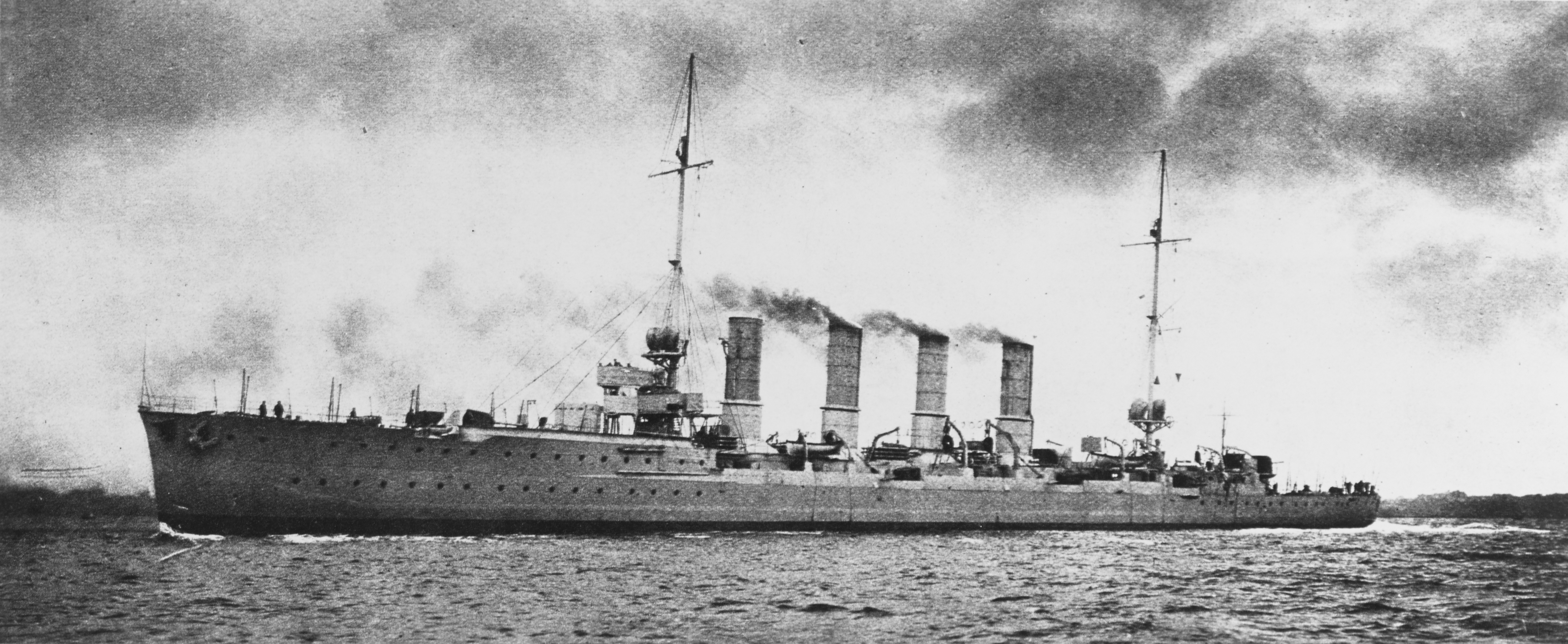
Light cruiser Rostock, scuttled 1st June after being torpedoed

=== High Seas Fleet (Hochseeflotte) ===
The High Seas Fleet was the main body of the German surface navy, principally based at Wilhelmshaven, on the Jade River in North-West Germany.

Commander-in-Chief (Chef der Hochseeflotte): Vizeadmiral Reinhard Scheer in SMS Friedrich der Grosse

Chief of Staff: KptzS Adolf von Trotha
Chief of Operations: KptzS Magnus von Levetzow

==== Battleships ====
3rd Battle Squadron (III. Geschwader) (battleships) (Note: Did not sail: SMS König Albert: KptzS Thorbecke (condenser breakdown), SMS Bayern: KptzS Max Hahn (new construction, working up at Kiel), tender SMS T.39.)
Konteradmrial Paul Behncke
Flag lieutenant: Korvettenkapitän Frhr Ernst von Gagern

5th Division: KAdm Behncke

SMS König (flagship): KptzS Friedrich Brüninghaus
SMS Grosser Kurfürst: KptzS Ernst Goette
SMS Kronprinz: KptzS Constanz Feldt
SMS Markgraf: KptzS Karl Seiferling

6th Division: KAdm Hermann Nordmann

SMS Kaiser (flagship): KptzS Walter Freiherr von Keyserlingk
SMS Prinzregent Luitpold: KptzS Karl Heuser
SMS Kaiserin: KptzS Karl Sievers

Fleet Flagship (Flaggschiff der Hochseeflotte) (Note: Did not sail: attached Fleet tenders SMS D4, SMS T96, SMS T98 and SMS T16.)

SMS Friedrich der Grosse: KptzS Theodor Fuchs

1st Battle Squadron (I. Geschwader) (battleships) (Note: Did not sail: attached tenders SMS Blitz and SMS T20)
Vizeadmiral Ehrhard Schmidt
Flag lieutenant: Korvettenkapitän Wolfgang Wegener

1st Division: VAdm Schmidt

SMS Ostfriesland (flagship): KptzS Ernst-Oldwig von Natzmer
SMS Thüringen: KptzS Hans Küsel
SMS Helgoland: KptzS Friedrich von Kameke
SMS Oldenburg: KptzS Wilhelm Höpfner

2nd Division: KAdm Walter Engelhardt

SMS Posen (flagship): KptzS Richard Lange
SMS Rheinland: KptzS Heinrich Rohardt
SMS Nassau: KptzS Robert Kühne
SMS Westfalen: KptzS Johannes Redlich

2nd Battle Squadron (II. Geschwader) (battleships) (Note: Did not sail: SMS Preussen: KptzS Frey, detached to Baltic as guard-ship at The Sound, and tenders SMS Pfeil and SMS T49.)
Konteradmrial Franz Mauve
Flag lieutenant: Korvettenkapitän Willy Kahlert

3rd Division: KAdm Mauve

SMS Deutschland (flagship): KptzS Hugo Meurer
SMS Hessen: KptzS Rudolf Bartels
SMS Pommern (sunk 1st June): KptzS Siegfried Bölken †

4th Division: KAdm Frhr Gottfried von Dalwigk zu Lichtenfels

SMS Hannover (flagship): KptzS Wilhlem Heine
SMS Schlesien: KptzS Friedrich Behncke
SMS Schleswig-Holstein: KptzS Eduard Varrentrapp

==== Light cruisers ====
IV. Aufklärungsgruppe ("4th Scouting Group", light cruisers) (Note: Did not sail: SMS Berlin: FKpt Hildebrand, at Wilhelmshaven; and SMS Brummer: KptzS Wilhelm Schulz, at Kiel.)
Kommodore Ludwig von Reuter
Flag lieutenant: Korvettenkapitän Heinrich Weber

SMS Stettin (flagship): FKpt Friedrich Rebensburg
SMS München: KKpt Oscar Böcker
SMS Frauenlob (sunk 31st May): FKpt Georg Hoffman †
SMS Stuttgart: FKpt Max Hagedorn
SMS Hamburg: KKpt Gerhard von Gaudecker (Note: Flagship of the Leader of U-Boats: ‘‘KptzS’’ Hermann Bauer, attached to the 4th Scouting Group for tactical purposes.)

==== Torpedo boats ====
German Große Torpedoboote ("large torpedoboats") were the equivalent of British destroyers . (Note: German torpedo boat flotillas typically comprised two half-flotillas of five vessels each, plus an additional vessel for the flotilla commander. The boats were given numbers sequentially based on the order in which they were built. In addition, each boat had an initial letter denoting its builder: V for the Vulcan works at Stettin, S for the Schichau Works at Elbing in East Prussia, B for the Blohm und Voss Works at Hamburg, and G for Krupp's Germania Works at Kiel. All but one of the boats that fought at Jutland belonged to the number series than began with SMS V1 in 1911 (only SMS V189 belonged to the earlier series). Boats numbered 1-24 were of the 1911 Type and served in the 5th and 7th Flotillas; boats numbered in the range 25-95 were of the 1913 Type and served in the 1st, 3rd, 6th and 9th Flotillas. The vessels in the 2nd Flotilla were of a special large type built in 1914-15 and designated Torpedobootzerstörer ("torpedo boat destroyers") .)

First Leader of Torpedo-Boats
Kommodore Andreas Michelsen

SMS Rostock (scuttled 1st June) (light cruiser; flagship 1st Leader of Torpedo-Boats): FKpt Otto Feldmann (Note: Attached to the 4th Scouting Group for tactical purposes.)

1st Torpedo-Boat Flotilla (I. Torpedoboots-Flottille) (Note: Did not sail: 2nd Half-Flotilla (2. halbsflottille), consisting of SMS G192: OLtzS Mewis, SMS G195: KptLt Mickel, SMS G196: KptLt Frhr von Seld, SMS G193: KptLt Oswald Paul and SMS S165: OLtzS Johannes-Henning Schneider, all under the command of FKpt Hans Kolbe.)

1st Half-Flotilla (1. Halbflottille): (Note: Did not sail: SMS V190: Lt(Reserve) Bon-Ed, and SMS G197: KptLt Crelinger.) KptLt Conrad Albrecht

SMS G39 (lead boat, half-flotilla): OLtzS Franz-Ferdinand von Loefen
SMS G40: KptLt Richard Beitzen
SMS G38: KptLt Hermann Metger
SMS S32: KptLt Hermann Froelich

3rd Torpedo-Boat Flotilla (III. Torpedoboots-Flottille)
Korvettenkapitän Wilhelm Hollmann

SMS S53 (lead boat, flotilla): KptLt Friedrich Götting

5th Half-Flotilla (5. Halbflottille) : (Note: Did not sail: SMS V74: KptLt Günther Ehrlich, and SMS G85: KptLt Hans Herbert Stobwasser.) KptLt Theophil Gautier

SMS V71 (lead boat, half-flotilla): OLtzS Friedrich Ulrich
SMS V73: KptLt Martin Delbrück
SMS G88: KptLt Hans Scabell

6th Half-Flotilla (6. Halbflottille): (Note: Did not sail: SMS V70: KptLt Lemelsen, SMS S55: KptLt Holscher.) Korvettenkapitän Theodor Riedel † (Note: Groos, Jutland Dispatches, Anlage 6./7. states KptLt Otto Karlowa in SMS S54 was the leader of the 6th Half-Flotilla on 30 May 1916; however from the narrative (Groos, Jutland Dispatches, p.304) it is clear that Riedel in V48 led the half-flotilla during the battle until the vessel was sunk in action and he was killed; the Second World War destroyer Z6 was named in Riedel's honor.)

SMS V48 (lead boat, half-flotilla) (sunk 31st May): KptLt Friedrich Eckoldt †
SMS S54: KptLt Otto Karlowa
SMS G42: KptLt Bernd von Arnim

5th Torpedo-Boat Flotilla (V. Torpedoboots-Flottille)
Korvettenkapitän Oskar Heinecke

SMS G11 (lead boat, flotilla): KptLt Adolf Müller

9th Half-Flotilla (9. Halbflottille): KptLt Gerhard Hoefer

SMS V2 (lead boat, half-flotilla): KptLt Gerhard Hoefer
SMS V4 (sunk 1st June): KptLt Armin Barop
SMS V6: OLtzS Hans Behrendt
SMS V1: OLtzS Hans Röthig
SMS V3: KptLt Manfred von Killinger

10th Half-Flotilla (10. Halbflottille): KptLt Friedrich Klein

SMS G8 (lead boat, half-flotilla): OLtzS Ernst Rodenberg
SMS V5: OLtzS Paul Tils
SMS G7: KptLt Johannes Weinecke
SMS G9: KptLt Hans Anschütz
SMS G10: OLtzS Waldemar Haumann

7th Torpedo-Boat Flotilla (VII. Torpedoboots-Flottille)
Korvettenkapitän Gottlieb von Koch

SMS S24 (lead boat, flotilla): KptLt Max Fink

13th Half-Flotilla (13. Halbflottille): KptLt Georg von Zitzewitz

SMS S15 (lead boat, half-flotilla): OLtzS Christian Schmidt
SMS S17: KptLt Hans-Joachim von Puttkammer
SMS S20: KptLt Albert Benecke
SMS S16: KptLt Walter Loeffler
SMS S18: KptLt Bruno Haushalter

14th Half-Flotilla (14. Halbflottille): (Note: SMS G172 did not sail as was refitting, SMS V186 sailed, but returned to port prior to action.) Korvettenkapitän Hermann Cordes

SMS S19 (lead boat, half-flotilla): OLtzS Georg Reimer
SMS S23: KptLt Arthur von Killinger
SMS V189: OLtzS Wilhelm Keil

=== Scouting Force ===
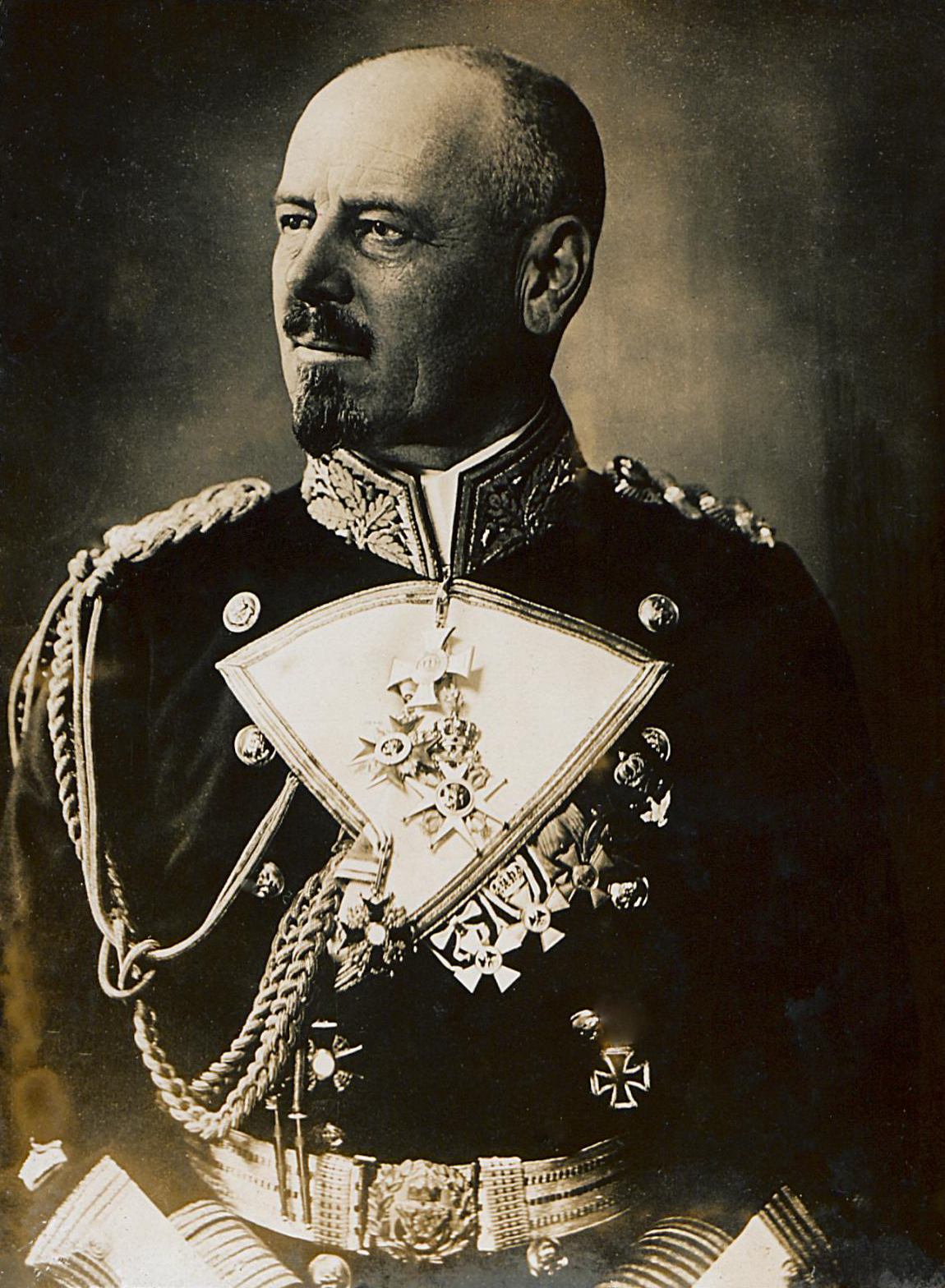
Vizeadmiral Franz Hipper

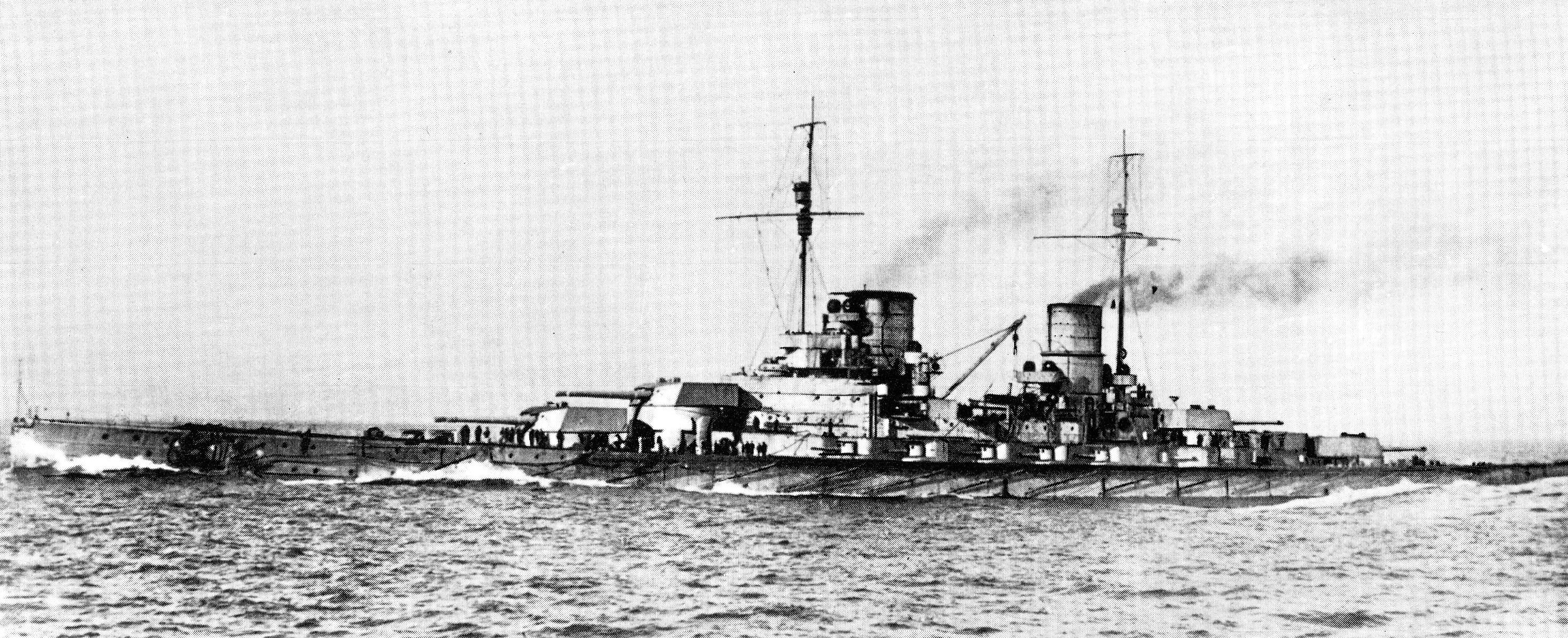
The battlecruiser Lützow, Vizeadmiral Hipper's flagship

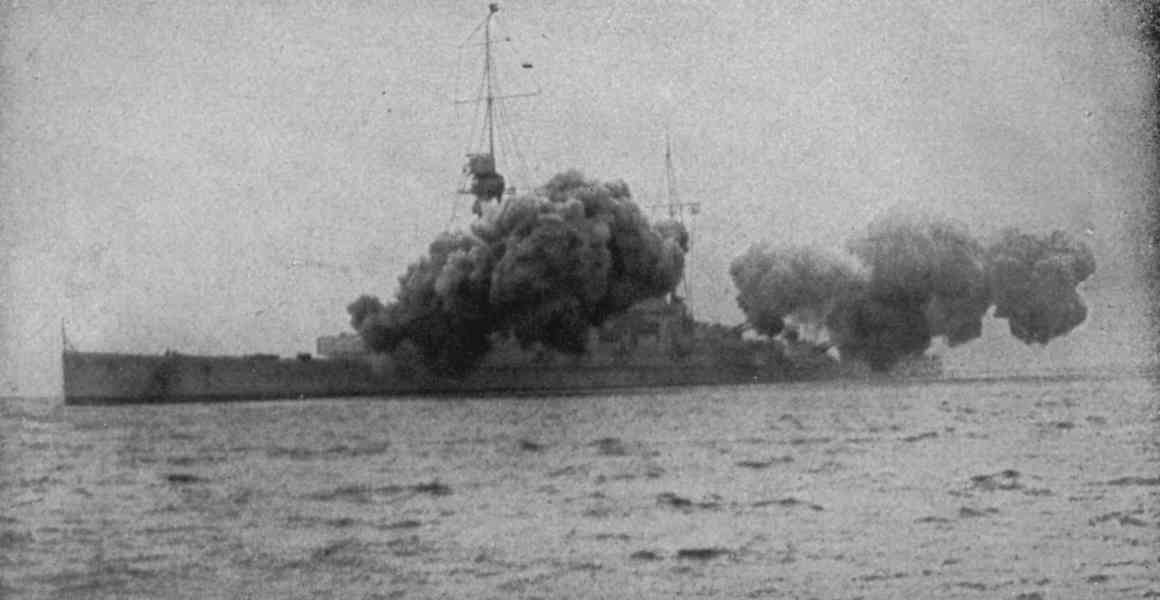
Battlecruiser Derfflinger firing a full broadside

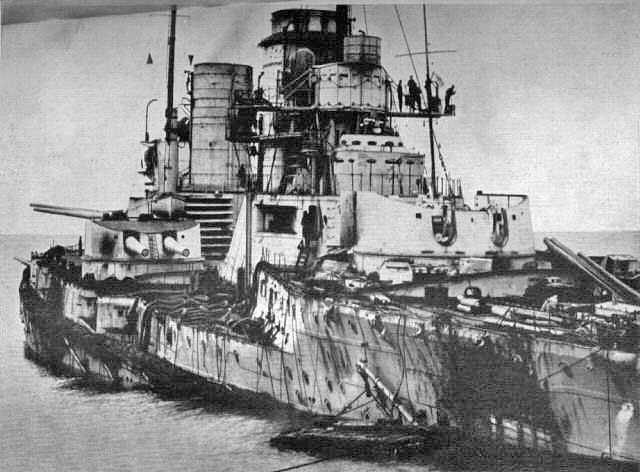
Seydlitz took a tremendous amount of damage during the battle. It was able to detach from the battle but was on point of sinking when pump steamers saved it

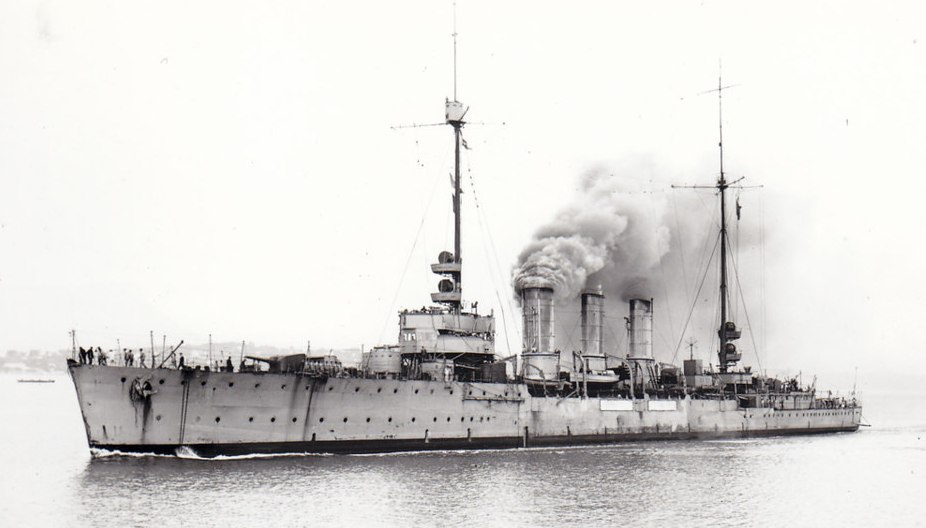
Light cruiser Regensburg in 1920

Commander, Scouting Forces (Befehlshaber die Aufklärungsstreitkräfte): Vizeadmiral Franz Hipper
Flag lieutenant: Korvettenkapitän Erich Raeder (Note: Raeder later became head of the German navy of the Weimar Republic and then Nazi Germany. He was sentenced to life imprisonment for war crimes at the Nuremberg Trials in 1946)

==== Battlecruisers ====
1st Scouting Group (I. Aufklärungsgruppe)
Vizeadmiral Hipper

- SMS Lützow (flagship) (scuttled 1 June): KptzS Victor Harder
- SMS Derfflinger: KptzS Johannes Hartog
- SMS Seydlitz: KptzS Moritz von Egidy
- SMS Moltke: KptzS Johannes von Karpf
- SMS Von der Tann: KptzS Hans Zenker

==== Light cruisers ====
2nd Scouting Group (II. Aufklärungsgruppe) (Note: Did not sail: SMS Graudenz: KptLt Beucer, under repair at Wilhelmshaven, and SMS Stralsund: ‘‘KptzS’’ Weniger, in dock at Kiel.)
Konteradmiral Friedrich Boedicker

SMS Frankfurt (flagship): KptzS Thilo von Trotha
SMS Elbing (scuttled 1 June): KFpt Rudolf Madlung
SMS Pillau: KFpt Konrad Mommsen
SMS Wiesbaden (sunk 1 June): KFpt Fritz Reiß †

==== Torpedo boats ====
Second Leader of Torpedo-Boats
Kommodore Paul Heinrich
SMS Regensburg (light cruiser; flagship Second Leader of Torpedo-Boats): KFpt Bruno Heuberer (Note: Attached to the 2nd Scouting Group for tactical purposes.)

II. Torpedoboots-Flottille (2nd Torpedo-Boat Flotilla )
Commander Heinrich Schuur
SMS B98 (lead boat, flotilla): KptLt Theodor Hengstenberg

- 3. Halbflottille (3rd Half-Flotilla) KKpt Heinrich Boest
  - SMS G101 (lead boat, half-flotilla): KptLt Rudolf Schulte
  - SMS G102: KptLt von Barendorff
  - SMS B112: KptLt Carl August Claussen
  - SMS B97: KptLt Leo Riedel
- 4. Halbflottille (4th Half-Flotilla): KKpt Adolf Dithmar
  - SMS B109 (lead boat, half-flotilla): KptLt Victor Hahndorff
  - SMS B110: KptLt August Vollheim
  - SMS B111: KptLt Heinrich Schickhardt
  - SMS G103: KptLt Fritz Spiess
  - SMS G104: KptLt Georg von Bartenwerffer

VI. Torpedoboots-Flottille (6th Torpedo-Boat Flotilla)

Lieut. Commander Max Schultz
SMS G41 (lead boat, flotilla): KptLt Hermann Boehm

- 11. Halbflottille (11th Half-Flotilla) : (Note: Did not sail: SMS S49: KptLt Bauftaedt and SMS V43: KptLt Carl.) KptLt Wilhelm Rüman
  - SMS V44 (lead boat, half-flotilla): KptLt Karl von Holleuffer
  - SMS G87: KptLt Siegfried Karstens
  - SMS G86: KptLt Kurt Grimm
- 12. Halbflottille (12th Half-Flotilla) KptLt Rudolf Lahs
  - SMS V69 (lead boat, half-flotilla): KptLt Robert Stecher
  - SMS V45: KptLt Martin Laßmann
  - SMS V46: KptLt Bruno Krumhaar
  - SMS S50: KptLt Philipp Recke
  - SMS G37: KptLt Wolf von Trotha

IX. Torpedoboots-Flottille (9th Torpedo-Boat Flotilla)

Lieut. Commander Herbert Goehle
SMS V28 (lead boat, flotilla): KptLt Otto Lenssen

- 17. Halbflottille (17th Half-Flotilla ): KptLt Hermann Ehrhardt
  - SMS V27 (sunk 31 May, lead boat, half-flotilla): OLtzS Hartmut Buddecke
  - SMS V26: KptLt Hans Köhler
  - SMS S36: KptLt Franz Fischer
  - SMS S51: KptLt Werner Dette
  - SMS S52: KptLt Wilhelm Ehrentraut
- 18. Halbflottille (18th Half-Flotilla): Korvettenkapitän Werner Tillessen
  - SMS V30 (lead boat, half-flotilla): OLtzS' Ernst Wolf
  - SMS S34: KptLt Otto Andersen
  - SMS S33: KptLt Waldemar von Münch
  - SMS V29 (sunk 31 May): KptLt Erich Steinbrinck †
  - SMS S35 (sunk 31 May): KptLt Friedrich Ihn †

=== Submarines ===
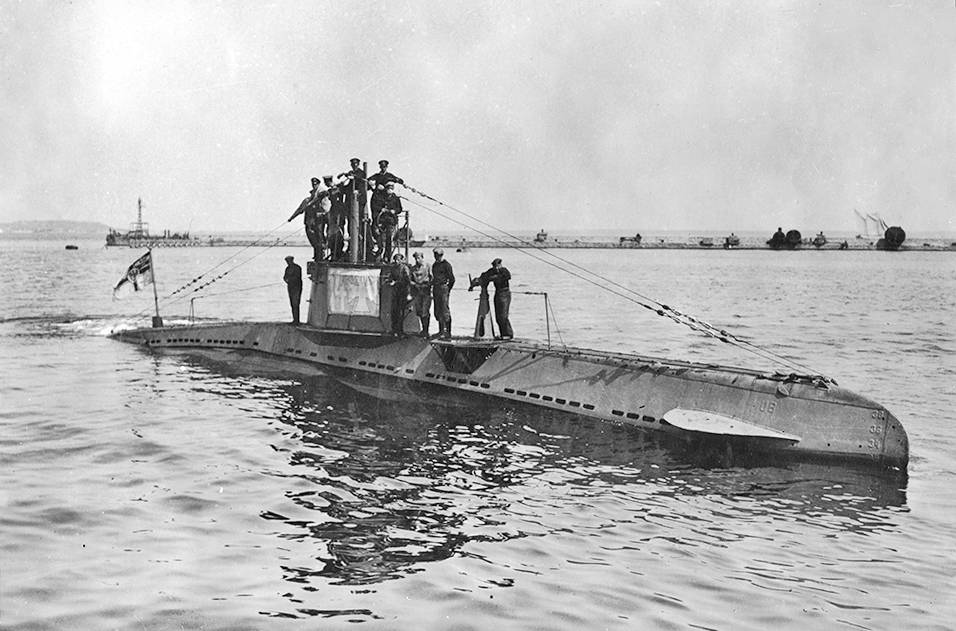
SM UB-14, a World War I German submarine

Führer der Unterseeboote ("Leader of the U-boats") in the North Sea Fregattenkapitän Hermann Bauer in SMS Hamburg

The following submarines were deployed to attack the Grand Fleet in the North Sea during the period of the Battle of Jutland

- Off Terschelling:
  - U-46: KptLt Leo Hillebrand
  - U-67: KptLt Hans Nieland
- Off the Humber Estuary:
  - UB-21: KptLt Ernst Hashagen
- Off Flamborough Head, Yorkshire:
  - UB-22: OLtzS Bernhard Putzier
- Off the Firth of Forth, Scotland:
  - U-52: KptLt Hans Walter
  - U-24: KptLt Rudolf Schneider
  - U-70: KptLt Otto Wünsche
  - U-32: KptLt Fahr Edgar von Spiegel von und zu Peckelsheim
  - U-51: KptLt Walter Rumpfel
  - U-63: KptLt Otto Schultze
  - U-66: KptLt Thorwald von Bothmer
- Off Peterhead, Scotland:
  - U-47: KptLt Heinrich Metzger
- Off the Pentland Firth (between the Orkneys and the Scottish mainland):
  - U-44: KptLt Paul Wagenführ
  - U-43: KptLt Helmuth Jürst

=== Airships ===
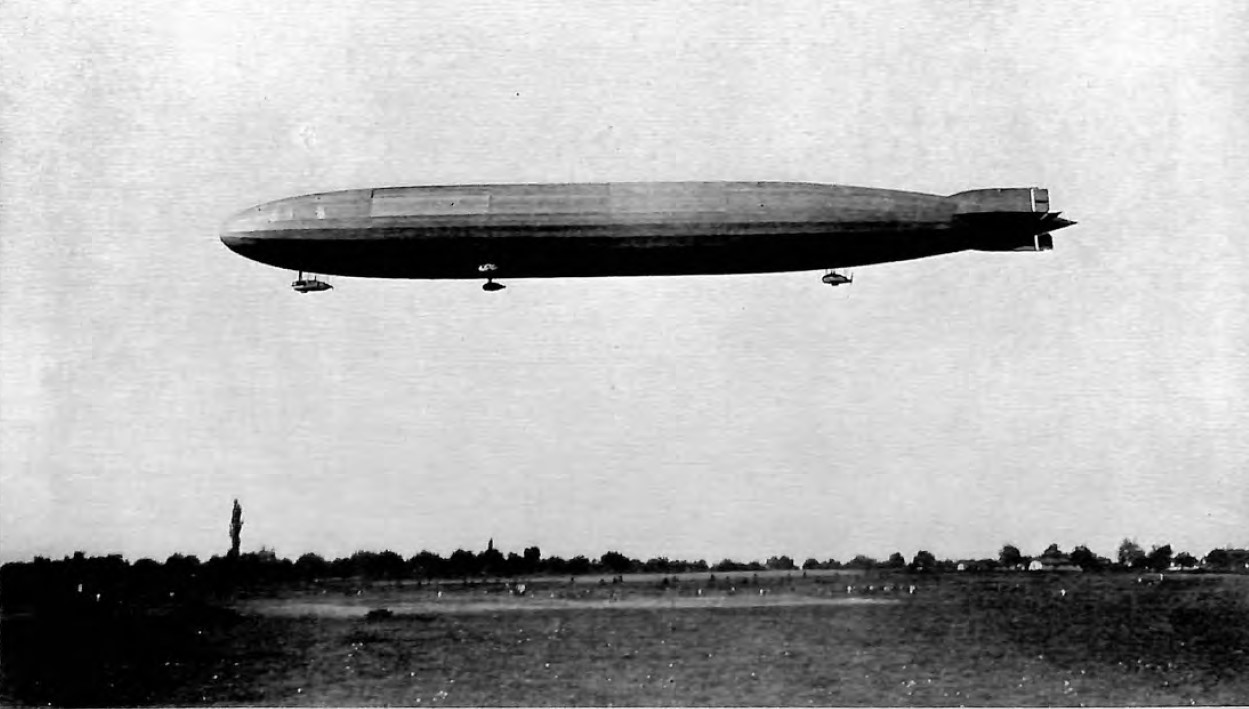
Typical German Zeppelin

During the battle the Germans used the Zeppelin airships of the Naval Airship Section (Marine Luftschiff Abteilung) for scouting, although in the prevailing overcast conditions they were not particularly successful. The commander of the Naval Airship Section was Korvettenkapitän Peter Strasser, and they flew from bases at Nordholz and Hage in north-west Germany and Tondern (then part of Schleswig; the town became part of Denmark in 1920).

Sortied on 31 May

L.9: KptzS August Stelling (Army Officer, on the inactive list)
L.14: KptLt Alois Böcker
L.16: KptLt Erich Sommerfeldt
L.21: KptLt Max Dietrich
L.23: KptLt Otto von Schubert

Sortied on 1 June

L.11: KptLt Victor Schultze
L.17: KptLt Herbert Ehrlich
L.22: KptLt Martin Dietrich
L.24: KptLt Robert Koch

Did not sortie during the Battle of Jutland

L.13: KptLt Eduard Prölß
L.30: OLtzS Horst Treusch von Buttlar-Brandenfels

== Bibliography ==
- The Admiralty, ed. (1920). Battle of Jutland, 30th May to 1st June 1916: Official Despatches with Appendices. London: H.M. Stationery Office.
- Campbell, John (1998). Jutland: An Analysis of the Fighting. Guilford: Lyons Press. ISBN 1-55821-759-2.
- Corbett, Julian (1923). Naval Operations. History of the Great War. Vol. III. London: Longmans, Green and Company.
- Groos, Otto (1925). Der Krieg in der Nordsee. Der Krieg zur See, 1914-18 (in German). Vol. 5. Berlin: Verlag von E. S. Mittler & Sohn.
- Hough, Richard (1964). Dreadnought: A History of the Modern Battleship. New York: Macmillan.
- Jane, Fred T. (1916). Jane's Fighting Ships. New York: McGraw-Hill. OCLC 5952041.
- Jellicoe, John (1919). The Grand Fleet, 1914–1916. Its Creation, Development, and Work. New York: George H. Doran Company. OCLC 13614571.
