= Karlowa =

Karlowa is a surname. Notable people with this surname include:

- Elma Karlowa (1932–1994), Yugoslav film and television actress
- Otto Karlowa (1883–1940), German Naval Officer and diplomat
