= HMS Cockatrice (1912) =

1912 Acasta-class British destroyer

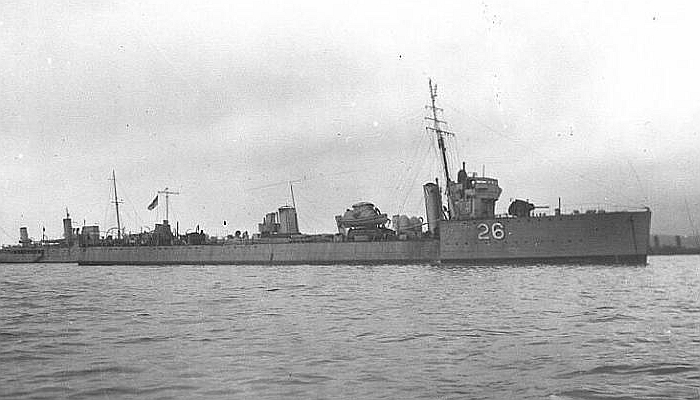
- HMS Cockatrice

History

United Kingdom
- Name: HMS Cockatrice
- Builder: Hawthorn Leslie and Company, Newcastle upon Tyne
- Laid down: 23 October 1911
- Launched: 8 November 1912
- Completed: March 1913
- Fate: Sold for scrap 9 May 1921

General characteristics
- Class & type: Acasta-class destroyer
- Displacement: 935 tons
- Length: 267 ft 6 in (81.5 m)
- Beam: 27 ft 0 in (8.2 m)
- Draught: 10 ft 6 in (3.2 m)
- Propulsion: Yarrow-type water-tube boilers; Parsons steam turbines
- Speed: 29 knots (54 km/h; 33 mph)
- Complement: 74
- Armament: 3 × 4 in (102 mm) BL Mk VIII guns; 2 × torpedo tubes

HMS Cockatrice was an Acasta-class destroyer of the British Royal Navy. She was built by Hawthorn Leslie and Company, launching in 1912 and served throughout the First World War. She was sold for scrap in 1921.

== Construction ==
Cockatrice was one of three Acasta-class destroyers ordered from the Newcastle upon Tyne shipbuilder Hawthorn Leslie and Company as part of the 1911–1912 shipbuilding programme for the Royal Navy. In all, 20 Acasta-class ships were ordered as part of this programme, of which 12, including Cockatrice, were to the standard Admiralty design with the other 8 ships to their builder's own designs. Cockatrice was laid down on 23 October 1911 and launched on 8 November 1912. In 1912, as part of a general reorganisation of the Royal Navy's destroyers into alphabetical classes, the Acastas became the K class, and in 1913, it was decided to switch to names beginning with the class letter, with Cockatrice being allocated the name Kingfisher, but this plan was abandoned for the class and Cockatrice completed under her original name in March 1913.

Cockatrice was 260 feet 0 inches (79.2 m) long between perpendiculars and 267 feet 6 inches (81.5 m) overall, with a beam of 27 feet 0 inches (8.2 m) and a draught of 10 feet 5 inches (3.2 m). Displacement was 892 long tons (906 t) normal (Note: The Navy list for October 1913 notes Cockatrice's displacement as 935 tons.) and 1,072 long tons (1,089 t) deep load. Four Yarrow boilers fed steam to direct drive Parsons steam turbines rated at 24,500 shaft horsepower (18,300 kW) and driving two shafts. This gave a speed of 29 knots (54 km/h; 33 mph). The ships had a crew of 73 officers and ratings.

The ship's main gun armament consisted of three 4-inch (102 mm) BL Mk VIII guns, (Note: Later ships in the class were armed with faster firing QF (quick-firing) guns with cased ammunition instead of the BL (breech-loading) guns which used bagged charges.) with 120 rounds of ammunition carried per gun. Two 21-inch (533 mm) torpedo tubes were fitted, while two reload torpedoes could be carried. By January 1916, Cockatrice was recorded as being fitted with minesweeping gear. In 1916, one of Cockatrice's 4-inch guns was converted to a high-angle mount, allowing it to be used for anti-aircraft fire, but in 1918, this gun, together with both torpedo tubes, was removed to allow a heavy depth charge armament.

== Service ==
Cockatrice joined her sister ships in the 4th Destroyer Flotilla of the Home Fleet based at Portsmouth. With the outbreak of the First World War in August 1914, the 4th Flotilla, including Cockatrice, joined the newly established Grand Fleet, based at Scapa Flow in Orkney. Cockatrice was damaged during a severe storm in December 1914.

Cockatrice remained part of the 4th Flotilla in May 1916, but was absent from the Battle of Jutland, when most of the 4th Flotilla took part, as she was undergoing refit. The 4th Flotilla, including Cockatrice, left the Grand Fleet and moved to the Humber in July 1916, with the role of protecting British minesweepers and deterring German minelayers off the east coast of England. By December that year, Cockatrice had relocated again as the 4th Flotilla transferred to Portsmouth to carry out anti-submarine operations in the English Channel, while by March 1917, the 4th Flotilla had moved to Devonport. On 13 and 14 May 1918, Cockatrice, on patrol with sister ships Christopher and Ambuscade, attacked possible submarine contacts with depth charges with no apparent results. Cockatrice was still part of the 4th Destroyer Flotilla in August 1918, but by the end of the war had joined the Northern Patrol Force based at Dundee.

== Disposal ==
Cockatrice was sold for scrap to the ship breakers Thos. W. Ward of Hayle on 9 May 1921.

== Pennant numbers ==
Pennant number	From	To
H73	6 December 1914	1 January 1918
H26	1 January 1918	Early 1919
G57	Early 1919	6 May 1921
