= Cyril Samuel Townsend =

Royal Navy Admiral (1875–1949)

Admiral Cyril Samuel Townsend CB (28 June 1875 – 31 March 1949) was a Royal Navy officer. He saw service during the First World War and later headed the British naval mission to Greece.

== Biography ==
=== Early life and career ===
In 1906, Townsend was appointed to the Royal Naval Barracks, Portsmouth to reorganize its disciplinary system after a high-profile disciplinary incident where the "on the knee" order was given, leading to a mutiny by hundreds of strokers and ratings. From 1913 to 1914 he commanded the Royal Naval War College.

=== First World War ===
During the First World War, Townsend saw active service during the Gallipoli Campaign, during which he was beachmaster at 'W Beach' during the Landing at Cape Helles in 1915.

He was appointed a Companion of the Order of St Michael and St George "in recognition of valuable services rendered during the War" in 1918; the appointment was later cancelled and replaced with an appointment as a Companion of the Order of the Bath the same year.

After the war, Townsend was the commander of the Gunnery School at Chatham until 1921. He was appointed naval aide-de-camp to the King in 1923 and was promoted to rear-admiral in 1924.

=== British Naval Mission to Greece ===
In 1925, Townsend was appointed head of the British naval mission to Greece, with the rank of vice-admiral in the Greek Navy. Townsend's main mission was to implement a scheme for naval training devised by Vice-Admiral Sir Richard Webb. The mission expanded technical and tactical training, and opened a naval staff college.

The mission fell afoul of Greek politics and was terminated in May 1926 ostensibly on grounds of economy, the dictator Theodoros Pangalos having declared that Greece could no longer afford foreign naval missions. Townsend left in June; it was noted at the time that he was not afforded the courtesies due to his rank when he departed and that no other foreign naval mission was asked to leave the country. However, decorations were bestowed to members of the mission later on. Townsend was himself appointed Grand Commander of the Order of the Redeemer.

=== Later career ===
From 1927 to 1929, Townsend was Rear Admiral in Charge, Gibraltar, and Admiral-Superintendent, Gibraltar Dockyard. In 1928, he presided over the court-martial of Captain K. G. B. Dewar. He retired in 1929. He was promoted to admiral on the retired list in 1933.
