= Otto Karlowa =

- Born: July 26, 1883; Heidelberg, Germany
- Died: April 9, 1940 (aged 56); Oslo, Norway
- Spouse: Mary Sthamer
- Relatives: Friedrich Sthamer (father in law)
- Military career
- Allegiance: Germany
- Branch: Imperial Navy
- Service years: 1901–1919
- Rank: Korvettenkapitän (corvette captain)
- Commands: SMS S54; 6th Half Flotilla; 5th Half Flotilla
- Conflicts: Battle of Jutland
- Other work: Businessman, Diplomat, Nazi Party organizer

Otto Georg Gustav Karlowa (26 July 1883 – 9 April 1940) was a German Naval Officer, Diplomat and Nazi Party Organizer in Britain.

Karlowa was born in Heidelberg on 26 July 1883. At his family's behest, he joined the Imperial German Navy in 1901. He was commander of the torpedo boat SMS S54 at the Battle of Jutland in May 1916 (Note: Groos also states that he was commander of the 6th Half-Flotilla at Jutland, as does the German commander at Jutland, Admiral Scheer , although it is more likely that Korvettenkapitän Theodor Riedel held that post at the start of the battle; see Groos, Op. Cit., p. 304.), and by June 1918 he was commander of the 5th Half-Flotilla of the 3rd Torpedo Boat Flotilla, based in Flanders. In 1919 he retired from the Navy with the rank of Korvettenkapitän (Lieutenant-Commander) (Note: There were three grades of Captain in the German Navy (Korvettenkapitän, Fregattenkapitän and Kapitän zur See, roughly corresponding to Lieutenant-Commander, Commander and Captain, respectively. Karlowa's highest rank is variously reported as Captain, Korvettenkapitän and Lieutenant-Commander.).

In 1919 Karlowa married Mary Sthamer (b. 1887), daughter of Friedrich Sthamer, the German ambassador to Great Britain. Karlowa was resident in London from 1923 onwards, as a representative of various German engineering companies. He held a diplomatic post at Batavia, Dutch East Indies in the early thirties, but in 1933 he was retired by the German Foreign Ministry due to his pro-Nazi views. He returned to London (where he lived at 213 Ashley Gdns, SW1) and became a member of the Nazi Party on 1 May 1934. In the spring of 1935 became the Ortsgruppenleiter (Local Group Leader) for Nazi Party members resident in London, and from May 1937 he was Landesgruppenleiter (Country Group Leader), organizing the activities of some 500 expatriate German Nazis throughout Britain and Ireland. Karlowa and the Nazi Party members in Britain were suspected of spying and intimidating German refugees, to such an extent that British government expelled him and eight others in May 1939 for Nazi activities.

Karlowa was killed in action during the invasion of Norway during the sinking of the cruiser Blücher in Oslofjord, 9 April 1940.
