= HMS Nonsuch (1915) =

British M-Class destroyer

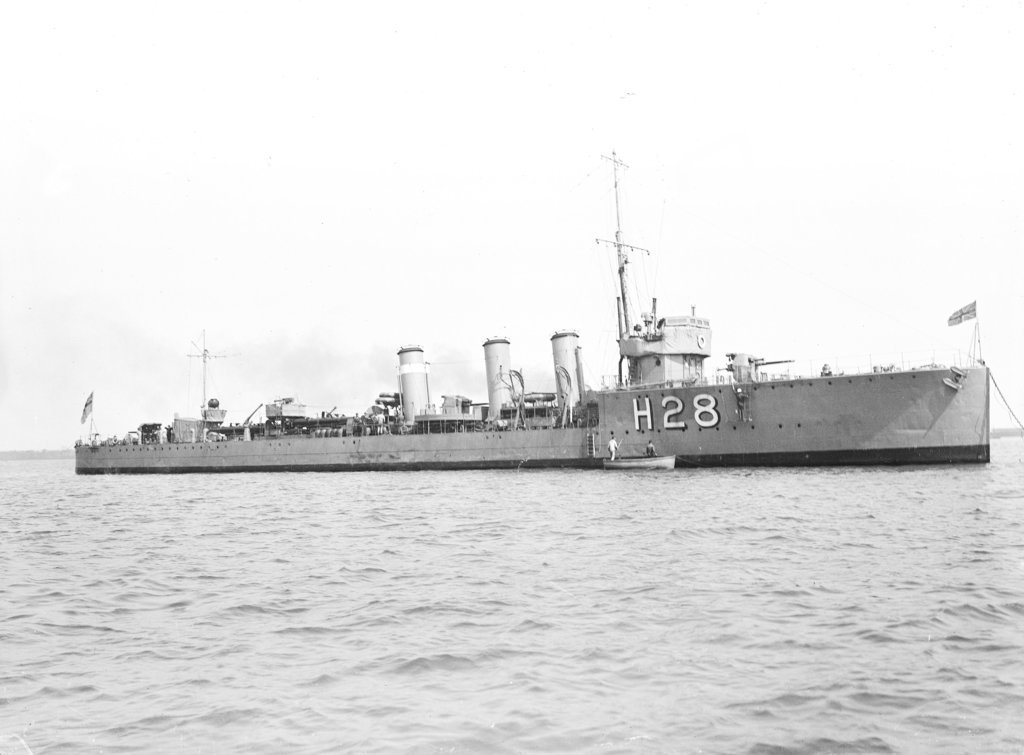
- Sister ship Orpheus

History

United Kingdom
- Name: Nonsuch
- Ordered: November 1914
- Builder: Palmers, Jarrow
- Laid down: 17 November 1914
- Launched: 7 December 1915
- Completed: February 1916
- Out of service: 9 May 1921
- Fate: Sold to be broken up

General characteristics
- Class & type: Admiralty M-class destroyer
- Displacement: 1,026 long tons (1,042 t) (normal)
- Length: 273 ft 4 in (83.3 m) (o/a); 265 feet (80.8 m) (p.p.)
- Beam: 26 ft 8 in (8.1 m)
- Draught: 8 ft 11 in (2.7 m)
- Installed power: 3 Yarrow boilers, 26,030 shp (19,410 kW)
- Propulsion: Parsons geared steam turbines, 3 shafts
- Speed: 34 knots (63 km/h; 39 mph)
- Range: 2,530 nmi (4,690 km; 2,910 mi) at 15 kn (28 km/h; 17 mph)
- Complement: 80
- Armament: 3 × single QF 4-inch (102 mm) guns; 2 × single 1-pdr 37 mm (1.5 in) AA guns; 2 × twin 21 in (533 mm) torpedo tubes

HMS Nonsuch was a Repeat Admiralty M-class destroyer that served in the Royal Navy during the First World War. The M class was an improvement on those of the preceding L class, capable of higher speed. Originally laid down as HMS Narcissus but renamed before being launched in 1915, Nonsuch joined the Twelfth Destroyer Flotilla of the Grand Fleet. During the Battle of Jutland in 1916, after being attacked by the light cruisers of the German High Seas Fleet, the warship rescued the damaged destroyer Acasta. The vessel formed part of the screen for the dreadnought battleships of the First Battle Squadron during the Second Battle of Heligoland Bight in 1917. In both actions, the destroyer reported no hits. After the Armistice that ended the war, Nonsuch was initially put in reserve and then sold in 1921 to be broken up.

== Design and development ==
Nonsuch was one of the nine Repeat Admiralty M-class destroyers ordered by the British Admiralty in early November 1914 as part of the Second War Programme soon after the start of the First World War. The M class was an improved version of the earlier L-class, required to reach a higher speed in order to counter rumoured new German fast destroyers. The remit was to have a maximum speed of 36 knots (67 km/h; 41 mph) and, although ultimately the destroyers fell short of that ambition in service, the extra performance that was achieved was valued by the navy. It transpired that the German warships did not exist.

The destroyer had a length of 265 ft (80.8 m) between perpendiculars and 273 ft 4 in (83.3 m) overall, with a beam of 26 ft 8 in (8.1 m) and draught of 8 ft 11 in (2.7 m). Displacement was 1,026 long tons (1,042 t) normal. Power was provided by three Yarrow boilers feeding Parsons geared steam turbines rated at 26,030 shaft horsepower (19,410 kW). The turbines drove three shafts and exhausted through three funnels. Design speed was 34 knots (63 km/h; 39 mph). A total of 228 long tons (232 t) of oil was carried. Design range was 2,530 nautical miles (4,690 km; 2,910 mi) at 15 knots (28 km/h; 17 mph), but actual endurance in service was less; sister ship Murray had a range of 2,240 nautical miles (4,150 km; 2,580 mi) at 15 knots (28 km/h; 17 mph).

Nonsuch had a main armament consisting of three single QF 4-inch (102 mm) Mk IV guns on the centreline, with one on the forecastle, one aft on a raised platform and one between the middle and aft funnels. Torpedo armament consisted of two twin torpedo tubes for 21 in (533 mm) torpedoes located aft of the funnels. Two single 1-pounder 37 mm (1.5 in) "pom-pom" anti-aircraft guns were carried. The anti-aircraft guns were later replaced by 2-pdr 40 mm (1.6 in) "pom-pom" guns. The ship had a complement of 80 officers and ratings.

== Construction and career ==
Narcissus was laid down by Palmers on 17 November 1914 at Jarrow, but was renamed Nonsuch before being launched on 7 December the following year. Completed three months later in April 1916, the vessel was the ninth of the name in service with the Royal Navy. The destroyer was deployed as part of the Grand Fleet, joining the Twelfth Destroyer Flotilla based at Scapa Flow.

On 30 May, the destroyer sailed with the Grand Fleet to confront the German High Seas Fleet in what would be the Battle of Jutland, forming part of the Second Division of the Flotilla that included sister ship Menace. The vessel was deployed in action against the German light cruisers Frankfurt and Pillau. However, as the destroyers manoeuvred, the cruisers attacked Menace and Nonsuch, which were at the rear of the flotilla. Nonsuch, veering swiftly to avoid being hit, lost touch with the remainder of the flotilla. Shortly afterwards, the vessel encountered the destroyer Acasta, previously damaged in the engagement, and towed the stricken ship back to Aberdeen, arriving on 2 June.

On 19 January 1917, Nonsuch was transferred to Harwich, soon after joining a minesweeping operation on the Swarte Bank in the North Sea. The destroyer remained based in Harwich, although still a member of the Twelfth Destroyer Flotilla. On 17 November, the destroyer took part in the Second Battle of Heligoland Bight, escorting the First Battle Squadron led by the dreadnought battleship Revenge. The warship saw no action in the battle. The flotilla subsequently took part in a large exercise with other flotillas and fleets of the Grand Fleet, led by the dreadnought battleship Iron Duke, between 22 and 24 November. At the end of the war, Nonsuch was part of the Third Destroyer Flotilla.

After the Armistice that ended the war, the Royal Navy returned to a peacetime level of strength and both the number of ships and personnel needed to be reduced to save money. However, the harsh conditions of wartime operations, exacerbated by the fact that the hull was not galvanised, meant that the ship was soon worn out. Nonsuch was declared superfluous to operational requirements, retired, and, on 9 May 1921, was sold to Ward, arriving at Milford Haven in September the following year to be broken up.

== Pennant numbers ==
Pennant number	Date
G12	September 1915
G39	January 1917
G38	January 1918
GA5	September 1918
G19	January 1919
