= HMS Acasta (1912) =

British naval ship

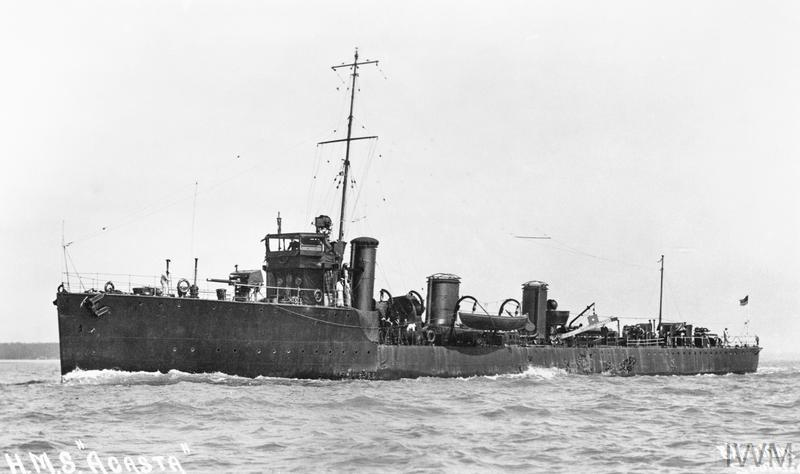
- HMS Acasta (Imperial War Museum)

History

United Kingdom
- Name: HMS Acasta
- Builder: John Brown & Company, Clydebank
- Laid down: 1 December 1911
- Launched: 10 September 1912
- Refit: June 1916
- Honours and awards: Jutland
- Fate: Sold for breaking up 9 May 1921

General characteristics
- Class & type: Acasta-class destroyer
- Displacement: 984 tons
- Length: 267 ft 6 in (81.5 m)
- Beam: 26 ft 9 in (8.2 m)
- Draught: 9 ft 6 in (2.9 m)
- Installed power: 24,500 hp (18,270 kW)
- Propulsion: Yarrow-type water-tube boilers; 2 shaft Brown-Curtis steam turbines
- Speed: 32 knots (59 km/h; 37 mph)
- Complement: 77
- Armament: 3 × QF 4 in (102 mm) L/40 Mark IV guns, mounting P Mk. IX; 1 × QF 2 pdr pom-pom Mk. II; 2 × single tubes for 21 in (533 mm) torpedoes

HMS Acasta was an Acasta-class destroyer of the Royal Navy, and the name ship of that class. She was built between 1911 and 1913, and was initially designated a K-class torpedo boat destroyer, having at various times the pennant numbers G40, H59 (1914) or H00 (1918). She saw extensive service during the First World War, including at the Battle of Jutland, where she was badly damaged. She was sold for breaking up in 1921.

== Construction ==
Acasta, originally intended to be named King, was laid down at John Brown's shipyard at Clydebank on 1 December 1911, launched on 10 September 1912 and completed the following month. Powered by two shaft Brown-Curtis steam turbines she had a maximum speed of 32 knots (59 km/h; 37 mph) and had a complement of 75-77 men. After completion she joined the 4th Destroyer Flotilla.

== Service during the First World War ==
Acasta served with the Grand Fleet from the outbreak of the First World War. Her depot ship was HMS Hecla. On 16 December 1914 she was in the 4th Destroyer Flotilla attached to a battle group sent to challenge several German ships intent on bombarding the North Yorkshire coast.

=== Battle of Jutland ===
During the Battle of Jutland, the 4th Flotilla was attached to Admiral David Beatty's Battlecruiser Fleet based at Rosyth, and assigned to cover the 3rd Battlecruiser Squadron, screening the cruiser HMS Chester. Acasta was commanded by Lieutenant Commander J. O. Barron. The squadron left Pentland Firth in the evening of 30 May 1916 and engaged the enemy at 5.40pm on 31 May.

During the battle, destroyer Shark was crippled by gunfire and was offered assistance by the already damaged Acasta but declined. In the same action, against at that time a superior enemy force, Acasta was hit by two 5.9-inch (150 mm) shells from SMS Derfflinger, which left her with six dead and one wounded, and unable to stop or steer. A signal from HMS Benbow at 6.40pm reported Acasta in danger of sinking. Admiral Beatty's report on the battle mentions an unknown, disabled destroyer which, from the time (about 7pm) may refer to Acasta. At 6.47 Iron Duke, the Grand Fleet's flagship, passed the disabled destroyer whose crew lined the sides to cheer the battleship as she passed. According to an eye-witness aboard HMS Valiant, Acasta was "badly holed, with HMS Galatea standing by her."

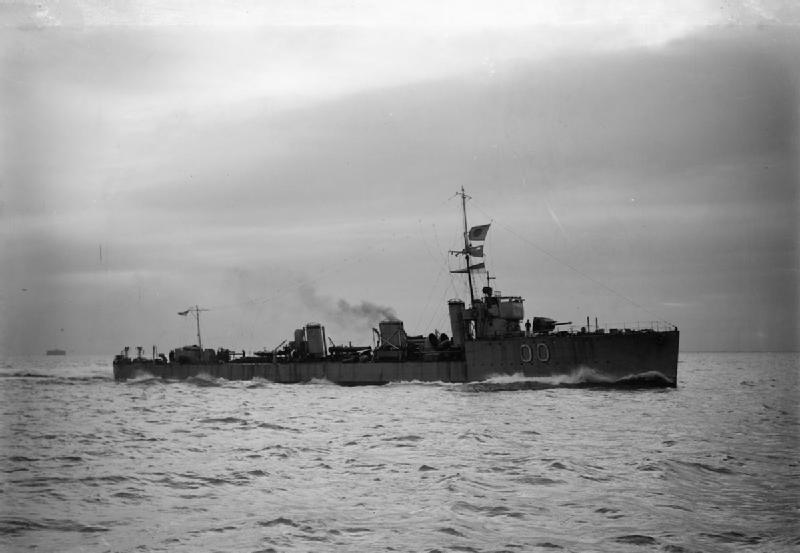
HMS Acasta c.1918

Acasta was able to effect some emergency repairs during the next six hours, but broke down again and was eventually taken in tow by HMS Nonsuch and reached Aberdeen two days after the battle, so badly damaged she practically had to be rebuilt. She claimed a torpedo hit on SMS Lützow but this was not officially confirmed. The German Admiralty's report of the battle on 1 June included the claim that Acasta had been destroyed.

=== After Jutland ===
After extensive repairs, completed by 2 August, Acasta went back into service, joining one of the destroyer flotillas (4th or 6th) in one of the English Channel bases of Portsmouth, Devonport or Dover. She sustained damage, with three casualties, following a collision in the English Channel on 22 December 1917.

== Post-war service ==
On 6 and 8 August 1919 Acasta attended the newly commissioned heavy cruiser HMS Hawkins on torpedo trials in Freshwater Bay.

== Fate ==
Acasta was sold on 9 May 1921 to Ward, Hayle for breaking up.
