= HMS Menace =

British M-Class destroyer

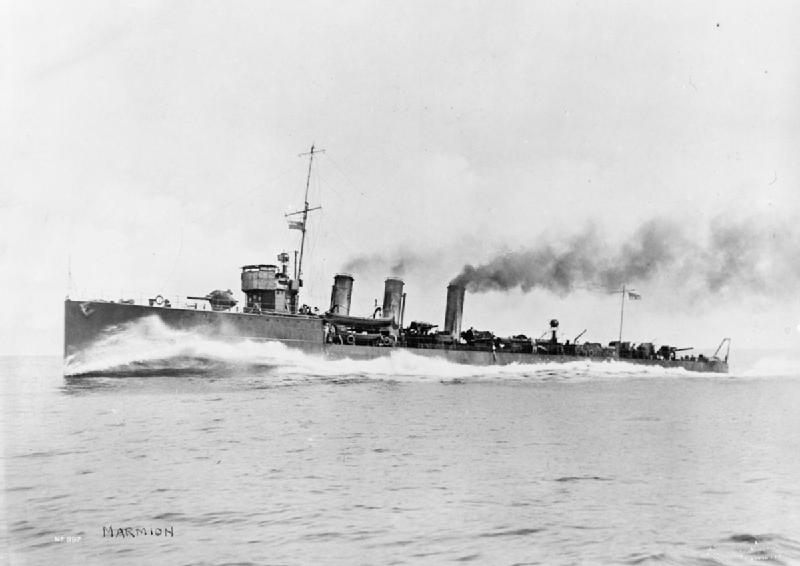
- Sister ship Marmion

History

United Kingdom
- Name: Menace
- Ordered: September 1914
- Builder: Swan Hunter & Wigham Richardson, Wallsend
- Laid down: 17 November 1914
- Launched: 9 November 1915
- Completed: April 1916
- Out of service: 9 April 1921
- Fate: Sold to be broken up from 8 February 1924

General characteristics
- Class & type: Admiralty M-class destroyer
- Displacement: 971 long tons (987 t) (normal)
- Length: 273 ft 4 in (83.3 m) (o/a); 265 feet (80.8 m) (p.p.)
- Beam: 26 ft 8 in (8.1 m)
- Draught: 8 ft 11 in (2.7 m)
- Installed power: 3 Yarrow boilers, 25,000 shp (19,000 kW)
- Propulsion: Brown-Curtiss geared steam turbines, 3 shafts
- Speed: 34 knots (63 km/h; 39 mph)
- Range: 2,530 nmi (4,690 km; 2,910 mi) at 15 kn (28 km/h; 17 mph)
- Complement: 80
- Armament: 3 × single QF 4-inch (102 mm) guns; 2 × single 1-pdr 37 mm (1.5 in) AA guns; 2 × twin 21 in (533 mm) torpedo tubes

HMS Menace was an Admiralty M-class destroyer which served in the Royal Navy during the First World War. The M class was an improvement on those of the preceding L class, capable of higher speed. Menace was launched in 1915 and joined the Twelfth Destroyer Flotilla of the Grand Fleet. During the Battle of Jutland in 1916, the destroyer attacked battleships and light cruisers of the German High Seas Fleet but recorded no hits. The vessel subsequently participated in the unsuccessful search for the armoured cruiser Hampshire, lost along with the Secretary of State for War, Field Marshal Lord Kitchener. The destroyer ended the war with the Third Destroyer Flotilla. After the Armistice that ended the war, Menace was initially put in reserve until being sold in 1921 to be broken up.

== Design and development ==
Menace was one of the sixteen Admiralty M-class destroyers ordered by the British Admiralty in September 1914 as part of the First War Programme at the start of the First World War. The M class was an improved version of the earlier L-class, required to reach a higher speed in order to counter rumoured new German fast destroyers. The remit was to have a maximum speed of 36 knots (67 km/h; 41 mph) although ultimately the destroyers fell short of that ambition in service. It transpired that the German warships did not exist, but the extra performance that Menace achieved was valued by the navy.

The destroyer had a length of 265 ft (80.8 m) between perpendiculars and 273 ft 4 in (83.3 m) overall, with a beam of 26 ft 8 in (8.1 m) and draught of 8 ft 11 in (2.7 m). Displacement was 971 long tons (987 t) normal. Power was provided by three Yarrow boilers feeding steam to Brown-Curtiss geared steam turbines rated at 23,000 shaft horsepower (17,000 kW), driving three shafts and exhausting through three funnels. Design speed was 34 knots (63 km/h; 39 mph). A total of 228 long tons (232 t) of oil was carried. Design range was 2,530 nautical miles (4,690 km; 2,910 mi) at 15 knots (28 km/h; 17 mph), but actual endurance in service was less; sister ship Murray had a range of 2,240 nautical miles (4,150 km; 2,580 mi) at 15 knots (28 km/h; 17 mph).

Menace had a main armament consisting of three single QF 4-inch (102 mm) Mk IV guns on the centreline, with one on the forecastle, one aft on a raised platform and one between the middle and aft funnels. Torpedo armament consisted of two twin torpedo tubes for 21 in (533 mm) torpedoes located aft of the funnels. Two single 1-pounder 37 mm (1.5 in) "pom-pom" anti-aircraft guns were carried. The anti-aircraft guns were later replaced by 2-pdr 40 mm (1.6 in) "pom-pom" guns. The ship had a complement of 80 officers and ratings.

== Construction and career ==
Laid down by Swan Hunter & Wigham Richardson on 17 November 1914 at Wallsend, Menace was launched on 9 November the following year and completed six months later in April 1916. The vessel was the first of the name in service with the Royal Navy and was deployed as part of the Grand Fleet, joining the Twelfth Destroyer Flotilla based at Scapa Flow.

On 30 May, the destroyer sailed with the Grand Fleet to confront the German High Seas Fleet in what would be the Battle of Jutland, forming part of the Second Division of the Flotilla that included sister ship Nonsuch. The vessel was deployed in action against the German light cruisers. However, as the destroyers approached, the first division, already being attacked by enemy gunfire, turned into their path and so Menace had to manoeuvre out of the way. The cruisers then pounced on Menace and Nonsuch, which were at the rear of the flotilla. The attack was so close that Menace narrowly avoided being rammed but escaped unharmed. The flotilla then redeployed and, observing the battleships of the High Seas Fleet ahead, sped into action. In the ensuing fight, Menace made a series of unsuccessful attacks, although the pre-dreadnought Pommern was sunk by Onslaught. It proved to be the final engagement of the battle.

The flotilla returned to Scapa Flow on 2 June. A few days later, Menace joined the unsuccessful search for the armoured cruiser Hampshire, sunk by a German mine off the coast of Mainland, Orkney. Hampshire had been sailing to Russia without escort with the Secretary of State for War, Field Marshal Lord Kitchener, but had sunk after hitting a mine and only 13 individuals, which did not include the Secretary of State, survived. The destroyer remained part of the Twelfth Destroyer Flotilla on 19 August. The flotilla subsequently took part in a large exercise with other flotillas and fleets of the Grand Fleet, led by the dreadnought battleship Iron Duke, between 22 and 24 November.

On 15 October 1917, Menace formed part of a large-scale operation, involving 30 cruisers and 54 destroyers deployed in eight groups across the North Sea in an attempt to stop a suspected sortie by German naval forces. The vessel, along with fellow destroyer Noble, was despatched from the flotilla to operate with the Third Light Cruiser Squadron. Despite these measures, the German light cruisers Bremse and Brummer managed to attack the regular convoy between Norway and Britain two days later, sinking nine merchant ships and two destroyers, Mary Rose and Strongbow, before returning safely to Germany. At the end of the war, Menace was part of the Third Destroyer Flotilla.

After the Armistice that ended the war, the Royal Navy returned to a peacetime level of strength and both the number of ships and personnel needed to be reduced to save money. The destroyer was transferred to reserve at Nore However, the harsh conditions of wartime operations, exacerbated by the fact that the hull was not galvanised, meant that the ship was worn out. Menace was retired, and, on 9 April 1921, was sold to Ward of Grays, and broken up from 8 February 1924.

== Pennant numbers ==
| Pennant number | Date |
|---|---|
| H7C | August 1915 |
| G30 | January 1918 |
| G6A | June 1918 |
| G34 | January 1919 |
