= Oliver Leggett =

British Officer

Vice-Admiral Oliver Elles Leggett, CB (10 May 1876 – 18 March 1946) was a Royal Navy officer. He served as Master of the fleet on the staff of Admiral Sir John Jellicoe at the Battle of Jutland in 1916. According to The Times, he was "regarded as one of the most talented and capable navigators of his time."
