= Eustace La Trobe Leatham =

Royal Navy Vice-Admiral (1870–1935)

Vice-Admiral Eustace La Trobe Leatham, CB (3 August 1870 – 1 September 1935) was a Royal Navy officer.

At the Battle of Jutland in 1916, Leatham commanded HMS Cochrane in the 2nd Cruiser Squadron.

He was appointed a Companion of the Order of the Bath in 1916.

He command the Britannia Royal Naval College from 1919 until 1921.
