= HMS Achates (1912) =

British naval ship

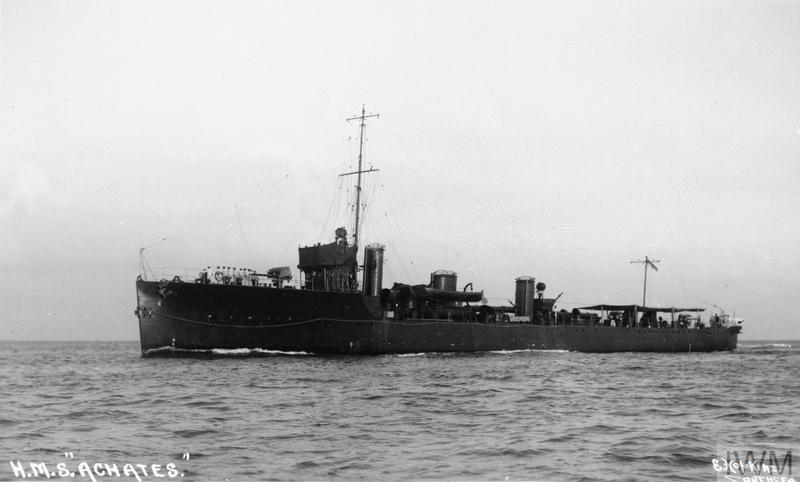
- HMS Achates

History

United Kingdom
- Name: HMS Achates
- Builder: John Brown & Company, Clydebank
- Laid down: 15 January 1912
- Launched: 14 November 1912
- Completed: March 1913
- Fate: Sold for scrap on 9 May 1921

General characteristics
- Class & type: Acasta-class destroyer
- Displacement: 935 tons
- Length: 267 ft 6 in (81.5 m)
- Beam: 27 ft 0 in (8.2 m)
- Draught: 10 ft 6 in (3.2 m)
- Propulsion: Yarrow-type water-tube boilers; Parsons steam turbines
- Speed: 29 knots (54 km/h)
- Complement: 74
- Armament: 3 × QF 4 in (102 mm) Mk VIII guns; 2 × torpedo tubes

HMS Achates was an Acasta (or K)-class destroyer of the British Royal Navy. She was built by the Scottish shipbuilder John Brown and was built between 1912 and 1913. Like all Acasta-class destroyers, Achates was armed with three 4-inch (102 mm) guns and two torpedo tubes, with a specified speed of 29 knots (54 km/h; 33 mph).

Achates served throughout the First World War, serving with the Grand Fleet in the early years of the war, and taking part in the Battle of Jutland in 1916. Later in the war she served as a convoy escort. She was sold for scrapping in 1921.

== Design and construction ==
Under the 1911–1912 shipbuilding programme for the Royal Navy, the British Admiralty ordered 20 Acasta-class destroyers, with 12 to the standard Admiralty design and 8 more builder's specials, with detailed design left to the builders. The Scottish shipbuilder John Brown & Company received an order for three Acastas (Acasta, Achates and Ambuscade) under the programme, all to be built to the standard Admiralty design.

The Acastas were larger and more powerful than the Acorn-class destroyers ordered under the previous year's programme. Greater speed was wanted to match large fast destroyers building for foreign navies, while a larger radius of action was desired. The destroyers built to the Admiralty standard design were 267 feet 6 inches (81.5 m) long overall and 260 feet 0 inches (79.2 m) between perpendiculars, with a beam of 27 feet 0 inches (8.2 m) and a draught of 10 feet 5 inches (3.2 m). Displacement was 892 long tons (906 t) Normal and 1,072 long tons (1,089 t) Deep load. (Note: Achates was listed as having a displacement of 982 tons in 1919.)

Four Yarrow boilers fed steam to direct drive Brown-Curtis steam turbines rated at 24,500 shaft horsepower (18,300 kW) and driving two shafts. This gave a speed of 29 knots (54 km/h; 33 mph). (Note: While the nominal speed of the Acastas at 29 knots was the same as the Acorns, this speed was required at full load displacement rather than the lighter displacements previously used. A trial speed of 29.5 knots (54.6 km/h; 33.9 mph) at full load corresponded to a speed of 32 knots (59 km/h; 37 mph) at the lighter loads previously specified.) Three funnels were fitted. The ship had an endurance of 1,540 nautical miles (2,850 km; 1,770 mi) at 15 knots (28 km/h; 17 mph). The ships had a crew of 73 officers and ratings.

Armament consisted of three 4-inch (102 mm) guns mounted on the ship's centreline, with one forward and two aft, with 120 rounds of ammunition carried per gun, together with two 21-inch (533 mm) torpedo tubes. Two reload torpedoes were carried. The ship was fitted with a 2-pounder "pom-pom" anti-aircraft autocannon during the First World War, while in 1918 the torpedo tubes and one of the 4-inch guns was removed to allow a heavy depth charge armament to be carried.

Achates (named after Achates, the companion of Aeneas in the Aeneid) was laid down at John Brown's Clydebank shipyard on 15 January 1912, with the yard number 413, and was launched on 14 November 1912. In 1913 the Admiralty decided to reclassify the Royal Navy's destroyers into alphabetical classes, with the Acasta class becoming the K class. New names were allocated to the ships of the K class, with the name Knight being reserved for Achates, but the ships were not renamed. (Note: It was considered unlucky to rename ships after they had been launched, which would also create considerable administrative problems. In addition, Winston Churchill, First Lord of the Admiralty noted that the names allocated to the Ks "are not good names".) Achates reached a speed of 32.3 knots (59.8 km/h; 37.2 mph) during sea trials. She was completed in March 1913.

== Service ==
Following commissioning, as with the rest of her class, Achates joined the 4th Destroyer Flotilla based at Portsmouth.

On the outbreak of the First World War in August 1914, the 4th Flotilla, including Achates, became part of the Grand Fleet based at Scapa Flow in Orkney. On 25 October 1914, Achates, together with Ardent, Ambuscade and Fortune, escorted the Second Battlecruiser Squadron when it sailed in support of an unsuccessful raid by seaplane carriers and the Harwich Force against airship sheds at Cuxhaven. Attacks on shipping by the German submarine U-21 in the Irish Sea in late January 1915 resulted in a large number of destroyers being sent from the Harwich Force and the Grand Fleet to hunt for the large number of submarines that were feared to be active in the Irish Sea. Achates was part of a division of five destroyers (Faulknor, Achates, Ambuscade, Owl and Hardy) that arrived at Milford Haven on 2 February. By the time the destroyers reached the Irish Sea and began anti-submarine patrols, U-21 had already left the area. On 13 February, Achates was one of seven destroyers from the 4th Flotilla ordered to patrol in the North Channel between Northern Ireland and Scotland as a result of attacks by the German submarine U-27. The destroyers remained in the area for a week.

Achates was under refit on 24 April 1916, and so did not take part in the Grand Fleet's sortie in response to the German Bombardment of Yarmouth and Lowestoft. Achates was one of 19 ships of the 4th Destroyer Flotilla that sailed in support of the Grand Fleet during the Battle of Jutland on 31 May/1 June 1916. During the night of 31 May/1 June, the 4th Flotilla had a number of engagements with the German battlefleet. At about 22:30 hr, the flotilla encountered German cruisers and battleships. The flotilla leader Tipperary was badly damaged by German shells (mainly from the battleship Westfalen) and later sank, while the leading ships in the British formation fired a total of nine torpedoes, none of which hit. Achates, seventh in line, did not fire any torpedoes. In manoeuvring to avoid the torpedoes, the German cruiser Elbing was rammed by the battleship Posen, with Elbing later being scuttled, while the British destroyer Spitfire collided with the German battleship Nassau. Shortly afterwards (about 23:50), the flotilla, now led by Broke, again encountered the same group of battleships and cruisers. Broke was badly damaged by fire from the cruiser Rostock and Westfalen, and collided with the destroyer Sparrowhawk, which was also rammed by Contest and was later scuttled. Rostock was hit by a single torpedo, fired by Ambuscade or Contest, and was also later scuttled. Achates did not fire any torpedoes in this engagement, as her commanding officer believed that British cruisers were in the vicinity. Achates found herself leading the remains of the flotilla, but after a third encounter with the German battleships, in which Fortune was sunk, lost contact with the rest of the flotilla, turning away in the belief that she was being pursued by German cruiser.

In order to counter German minelayers and to protect British minesweepers in the North Sea, the 4th Flotilla, including Achates, transferred to Immingham on the Humber estuary at the end of July 1916. The flotilla, including Achates, moved again to Portsmouth in November that year. On 16 December 1916 Achates was patrolling with Owl and Contest off The Lizard when they received a report of a German submarine (actually UB-38) attacking shipping off the Cornish coast. They searched for the submarine, deploying explosive paravanes, but although one of Achates's paravanes detonated during the search, UB-38 escaped unharmed. On 20 December the same three destroyers were ordered to patrol off Ushant in response to U-boat sightings. On 13 January 1917, Achates was patrolling off the Channel Islands, when she encountered the Japanese steamer Hakata Maru, which was being pursued by a German submarine, possibly UC-18 or UC-38, resulting in the submarine diving away and saving the steamer. On 24 May 1917, Achates was on patrol off Berry Head, Dorset, when gunfire was heard and the destroyer investigated, sighting the fishing vessel Competitor, which had been fired upon by the German submarine UB-38, and whose crew had abandoned ship. Achates streamed explosive paravanes, both of which detonated, although UB-38 escaped unharmed, and Competitor' s crew re-boarded the fishing vessel. In May 1917, Achates formed part of the escort for the first convoy from Gibraltar to Britain. On 6 July 1918, Achates was one of six destroyers escorting the Atlantic convoy HH.4, inbound from the Hampton Roads, when the oiler SS Wabasha was torpedoed by the German submarine UB-32. Achates dropped ten depth charges on the submarine, followed by four from Garland, but the submarine escaped unharmed. Wabasha survived the torpedoing being escorted into Falmouth by Spitfire. Achates remained part of the 4th Flotilla at the end of the war on 11 November 1918.

== Disposal ==
At the end of the war, all pre-war destroyers were quickly withdrawn from active service. Achates was listed as being at The Nore in January 1919, and by July was listed as in reserve. She was reduced to Care and Maintenance status on 4 February 1920, and was sold to Ward for scrapping at their Rainham yard on 9 May 1921.

== Pennant numbers ==
Pennant number	From	To
H46	1914	1918
H0	1 January 1918	-
