= HMS Porpoise (1913) =

Destroyer of the Royal Navy

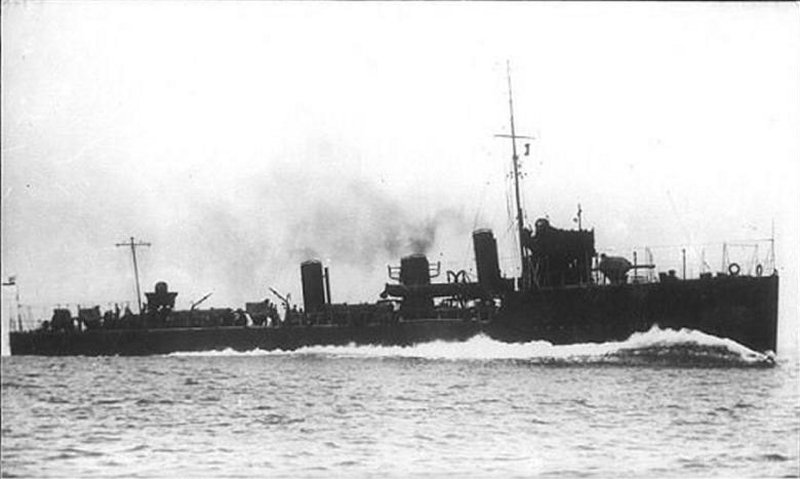

History

United Kingdom
- Name: HMS Porpoise
- Builder: John I. Thornycroft & Company, Woolston
- Laid down: 14 March 1912
- Launched: 21 July 1913
- Completed: January 1914
- Honours and awards: Jutland
- Fate: Sold to Brazil March 1920

Brazil
- Name: Alexandrino de Alencar
- Acquired: March 1920
- Commissioned: 9 December 1922
- Renamed: Maranhão, 1927
- Fate: Discarded 13 September 1946

General characteristics
- Class & type: Acasta-class destroyer
- Displacement: 934 long tons (949 t)
- Length: 265 ft 3 in (80.8 m) oa
- Beam: 26 ft 6 in (8.1 m)
- Draught: 9 ft 3 in (2.8 m)
- Installed power: 22,500 shp (16,778 kW)
- Propulsion: Yarrow-type water-tube boilers; 2 shaft Parson steam turbines
- Speed: 31 knots (57 km/h; 36 mph)
- Complement: 73
- Armament: 3 × QF 4 in (102 mm) Mark IV guns; 1 × QF 2 pdr pom-pom Mk. II; 2 × single tubes for 21 in (533 mm) torpedoes

HMS Porpoise was an Acasta-class destroyer of the Royal Navy, which was built by Thornycroft between 1912 and 1914. Porpoise served through the First World War, taking part at the Battle of Jutland in 1916, where she was damaged. In 1920, she was sold to the Brazilian Navy serving under the name Alexandrino de Alencar and was renamed Maranhão in 1927. Maranhão remained in service when Brazil entered the Second World War, being used for patrol and convoy duties. She was disposed of in 1945.

== Construction and design ==
The British Admiralty placed orders for 20 Acasta-class destroyers as part of the 1911–1912 shipbuilding programme for the Royal Navy, with 12 ships to the standard Admiralty design, and 8 more as builder's specials, built to the detailed designs of shipyards specialising in destroyer construction. Porpoise was one of five builder's specials ordered from Thornycroft of Southampton. (Note: Three of these ships (Paragon, Unity and Victor) were to the same design as Porpoise, while Hardy, intended as a testbed for diesel propulsion, was to a further modified design.)

Porpoise was 265 feet 3 inches (80.8 m) long overall and 257 feet 0 inches (78.3 m) between perpendiculars, with a beam of 29 feet 6 inches (9.0 m) and a draught of 9 feet 3 inches (2.8 m). Displacement was 928 long tons (943 t). Four Yarrow boilers fed steam to Parsons steam turbines rated at 22,500 shaft horsepower (16,778 kW), giving a design speed of 31 knots (57 km/h; 36 mph). The ship had a crew of 73 officers and ratings.

The ship's main gun armament consisted of three 4-inch (102 mm) QF Mark IV guns, with 120 rounds of ammunition carried per gun. Two 21-inch (533 mm) torpedo tubes were fitted, while two reload torpedoes could be carried. The ship was fitted with a 2-pounder "pom-pom" anti-aircraft autocannon during the First World War, while in 1918 the torpedo tubes (and possibly one of the 4-inch guns) was removed to allow a heavy depth charge armament to be carried.

Porpoise was laid down at Thornycoft's Woolston shipyard on 14 March 1913 and launched on 21 July 1913. In 1912, as part of a general reorganisation of the Royal Navy's destroyers into alphabetical classes, the Acastas became the K class, and in 1913, it was decided to switch to names beginning with the class letter, with Porpoise being allocated the name Kennington, but this plan was abandoned for the class and Porpoise completed under her original name in January 1914.

== Service ==
=== Royal Navy ===
On commissioning, Porpoise joined her sister ships in the 4th Destroyer Flotilla, based at Portsmouth. On the outbreak of the First World War, the 4th Flotilla, including Porpoise, became part of the Grand Fleet. On 23 December 1915, Porpoise and the destroyer Morning Star were escorting a Russian icebreaker when forced to hove to near Fair Isle in a heavy gale. On 24 December, the 1st Cruiser Squadron, on patrol in the North Sea were ordered to search for the two destroyers, and the cruisers Hampshire and Donegal left Scapa Flow to join in the search. Porpoise reached the shelter of the Cromarty Firth on 25 December, with Morning Star following on 26 December, both destroyers having suffered extensive weather damage and flooding. She was under refit on 24 April 1916, and so did not take part in the Grand Fleet's sortie in response to the German Bombardment of Yarmouth and Lowestoft.

Porpoise, under the command of Commander Hugh D Colville, was one of 19 ships of the 4th Destroyer Flotilla that sailed in support of the Grand Fleet during the Battle of Jutland on 31 May/1 June 1916. During the night of 31 May/1 June, the 4th Flotilla had a number of engagements with the German battlefleet. At about 22:30 hr, the flotilla encountered German cruisers and battleships. The flotilla leader Tipperary was badly damaged by German shells (mainly from the battleship Westfalen) and later sank, while the leading ships in the British formation fired a total of nine torpedoes, none of which hit. (Note: Porpoise, eleventh in line, did not fire any torpedoes.) In manoeuvring to avoid the torpedoes, the German cruiser Elbing was rammed by the battleship Posen, with Elbing later being scuttled, while the British destroyer Spitfire collided with the German battleship Nassau. Shortly afterwards (about 23:50), the flotilla, now led by Broke, again encountered the same group of battleships and cruisers. Broke was badly damaged by fire from the cruiser Rostock and Westfalen, and collided with the destroyer Sparrowhawk, which was also rammed by Contest and was later scuttled. Rostock was hit by a single torpedo, fired by Ambuscade or Contest, and was also later scuttled. The remains of the flotilla, by now led by Fortune, with Porpoise second in line encountered the German line again at about 00:10 hr. Fortune was heavily hit and sunk by German shells, while Porpoise, partly shielded by Fortune was hit twice. One shell, striking near her bridge, damaged the ship's steering, while a second shell, striking at the base of the aft funnel, burst the air chamber of Porpoise's spare torpedo, which in turn severed her main steam main. Two men were killed and two wounded. After restoring steering, Porpoise limped away with two of her four boilers disabled by loss of feedwater, finally reaching the River Tyne in the company of Contest and Garland on 2 June. Porpoise was under repair until 17 June.

In order to counter German minelayers and to protect British minesweepers in the North Sea, the 4th Flotilla transferred to the Humber in July 1916. On 18 August 1916, the Grand Fleet sailed in response to a sortie by the German High Seas Fleet. The two fleets failed to meet each other before the Germans withdrew, but as the Grand Fleet was heading for home, the light cruiser Falmouth was torpedoed twice by the German submarine U-66 at 16:52hr. Porpoise, along with Victor, Unity and Ambuscade, that set out from the Humber to meet Falmouth. Despite the heavy destroyer escort, which grew to nine destroyers, Falmouth was struck by two more torpedoes from U-63 at noon on 20 August. Porpoise spotted U-63's periscope and attempted to ram the submarine, but only made a glancing impact which did not damage the submarine. Falmouth eventually sank at 08:10hr on 21 August near Flamborough Head. In September 1916, Porpoise was one of four destroyers of the 4th Flotilla that were ordered to the English Channel as a result of a spurt of U-boat activity. On 12 September, Porpoise, along with Spitfire and Unity, spotted a U-boat, and attacked with depth charges with no result. The four destroyers returned to the Humber on 27 September. Following the Battle of Dover Strait, where a raid by German torpedo boats on the Dover Strait resulted in the loss of the destroyer HMS Flirt and several drifters, it was decided to strengthen British naval forces in the English Channel. Porpoise was one of five destroyers of the 4th Flotilla transferred to the 6th Destroyer Flotilla, part of the Dover Patrol, joining on 21 November 1916, while the remainder of the 4th Flotilla moved to Portsmouth for anti-submarine operations. On the night of 25/26 February 1917, German torpedo boats attempted another raid against the Dover Barrage and Allied shipping in the Dover Straits, with one flotilla attacking the Barrage and a half flotilla of torpedo boats operating off the Kent coast. Porpoise was one of a group of destroyers and cruisers protecting shipping anchored in the Downs. The German force sent against the Downs was spotted near the North entrance to the Downs, prior to shelling Margate and Westgate-on-Sea. While the Porpoise's division sortied against this force, they did not manage to find the German force. The southern German force withdrew following an exchange of gunfire with the destroyer Laverock.

On 8 March 1917, Porpoise left the 6th Flotilla, rejoining the 4th Flotilla, now based at Devonport and employed on convoy escort duties. On 6 April 1917, the German submarine UB-39 stopped the French sailing vessel La Tour d'Auvergne, carrying a load of pit-props to Cardiff, 15 nautical miles (28 km) south-southeast of the Longships Lighthouse, and set the sailing vessel on fire. Porpoise then arrived on the scene and drove UB-39 away, but although La Tour d'Auvergne was towed to Mullion, Cornwall, she was declared a constructive total loss. In May 1917, Porpoise formed part of the escort for the first convoy from Gibraltar to Britain. Porpoise remained part of the 4th Flotilla at the end of the war on 11 November 1918.

=== Brazil ===
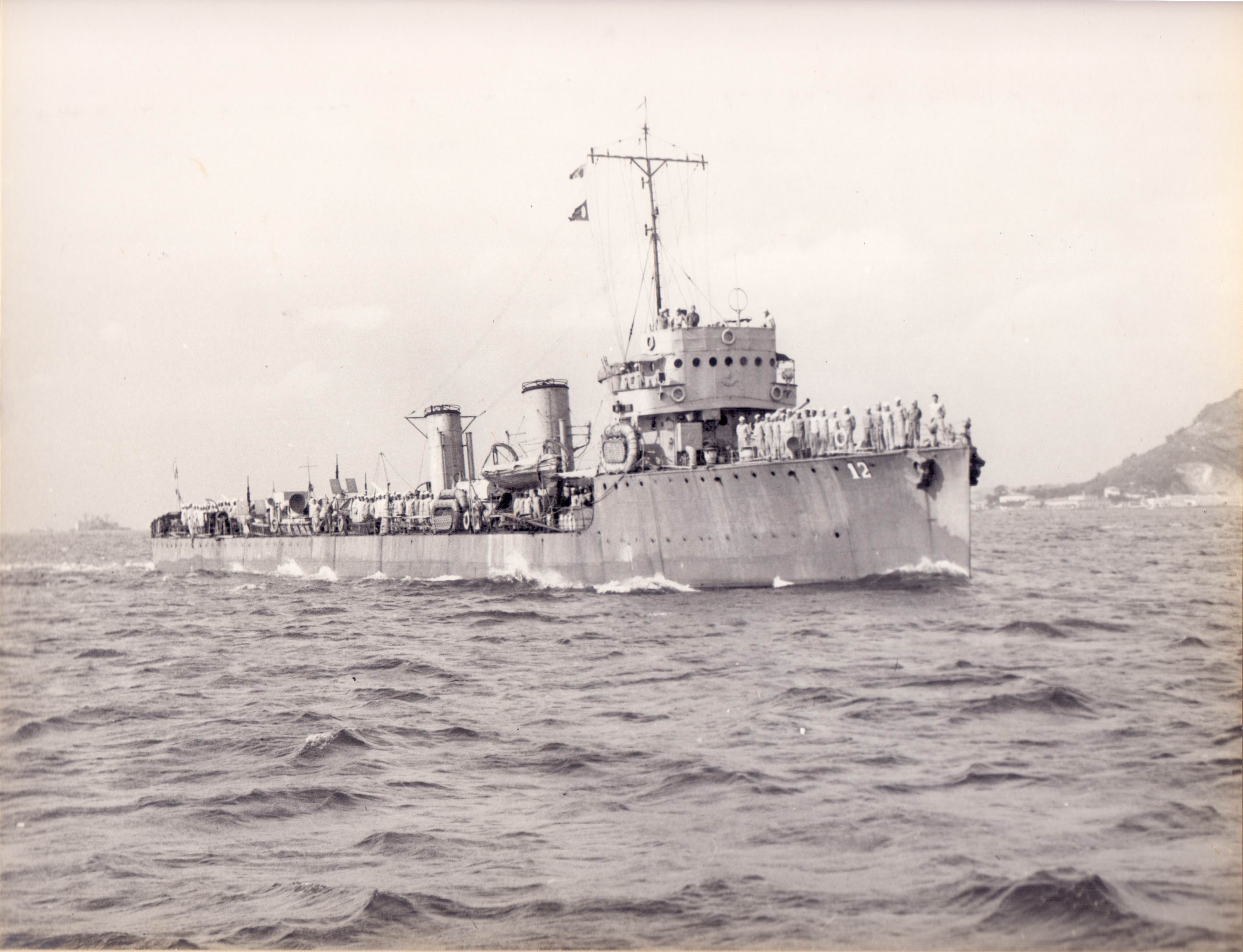
Maranhão

In March 1920, Porpoise was sold to Thornycroft for refurbishing and onwards sale to Brazil as Alexandrino de Alencar commissioning in the Brazilian Navy on 9 December 1922. The ship was fitted with modified armament for Brazilian service, with three 4-inch guns and two 47 mm (2 in) guns, and four 450 mm (18 in) torpedo tubes in two twin mounts, all supplied by the British company Armstrong Whitworth. (Note: The 1931 Jane's Fighting Ships claims that Maranhão was fitted with four 21-inch torpedo tubes, and that her secondary armament consisted of a single 2-pounder gun.) She was renamed Maranhão in 1927.

In 1930, Maranhão took part in attempts to stop the Revolution of 1930 that brought Getúlio Vargas to power. In 1931 she was used as a training ship for stokers. In 1935, the ship took part in the suppression of a communist uprising.

Brazil became involved in the Second World War in 1942, and while Maranhão was obsolete, she was used for convoy escort and patrol duties. During the war, she was fitted with sonar and depth charge rails, and her armament was supplemented by three Oerlikon 20 mm cannon. On 12 July 1943, the German submarine U-172 sunk the merchant ship African Star with torpedoes in the South Atlantic, killing one of African Star's crew. Maranhão rescued the 86 survivors the next day, returning them to Rio de Janeiro. Maranhão was decommissioned on 13 September 1946.

== See also ==
- List of historical ships of the Brazilian Navy
