= HMS Ambuscade (1913) =

Acasta-class destroyer

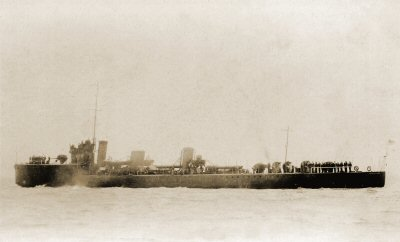
- HMS Ambuscade

History

United Kingdom
- Name: HMS Ambuscade
- Builder: John Brown & Company, Clydebank
- Yard number: 414
- Launched: 25 January 1913
- Fate: Sold for scrap on 6 September 1921

General characteristics
- Class & type: Acasta-class destroyer
- Displacement: 935 tons
- Length: 267 ft 6 in (81.5 m)
- Beam: 27 ft 0 in (8.2 m)
- Draught: 10 ft 6 in (3.2 m)
- Propulsion: Yarrow-type water-tube boilers; Parsons steam turbines
- Speed: 29 knots (54 km/h; 33 mph)
- Complement: 74
- Armament: 3 × QF 4 in (102 mm) Mk IV guns; 2 × torpedo tubes

HMS Ambuscade was an Acasta-class destroyer of the Royal Navy and was launched in 1913. She served throughout the First World War, forming part of the Grand Fleet and taking part at the Battle of Jutland, serving in the Dover Patrol and spending the latter part of the war as a convoy escort. She was sold for scrapping in 1921.

== Construction ==
Ambuscade was one of three Acasta-class destroyers ordered from John Brown & Company of Clydebank as part of the 1911–1912 shipbuilding programme for the Royal Navy. In all, 20 Acasta-class ships were ordered as part of this programme, of which 12, including Ambuscade, were to the standard Admiralty design with the other eight ships to their builder's own designs. She was laid down, as yard number 411, on 7 March 1912 and launched on 25 January 1913. In 1912, as part of a general reorganisation of the Royal Navy's destroyers into alphabetical classes, the Acastas became the K class, and in 1913, it was decided to switch to names beginning with the class letter, with Ambuscade being allocated the name Keith, but this plan was abandoned for the class and Ambuscade completed under her original name in June 1913.

Ambuscade was 260 feet 0 inches (79.2 m) long between perpendiculars and 267 feet 6 inches (81.5 m) overall, with a beam of 27 feet 0 inches (8.2 m) and a draught of 10 feet 5 inches (3.2 m). Displacement was 892 long tons (906 t) normal (Note: The Navy list for October 1913 notes Ambuscade's displacement as 935 tons.) and 1,072 long tons (1,089 t) deep load. Four Yarrow boilers fed steam to direct drive Brown-Curtis steam turbines rated at 24,500 shaft horsepower (18,300 kW) and driving two shafts. This gave a speed of 29 knots (54 km/h; 33 mph). The ships had a crew of 73 officers and ratings.

The ship's main gun armament consisted of three 4-inch (102 mm) BL Mk VIII guns, (Note: Later ships in the class were armed with faster firing QF (quick-firing) guns with cased ammunition instead of the BL guns which used bagged charges.) with 120 rounds of ammunition carried per gun. Two 21-inch (533 mm) torpedo tubes were fitted, while two reload torpedoes could be carried. (Note: Ambuscade appears to have carried a single spare torpedo at the Battle of Jutland. She is recorded as firing three torpedoes and having none left at the end of the battle.) The ship was fitted with a 2-pounder "pom-pom" anti-aircraft autocannon during the First World War, while in 1918 the torpedo tubes (and possibly one of the 4-inch guns) was removed to allow a heavy depth charge armament to be carried.

== Service ==
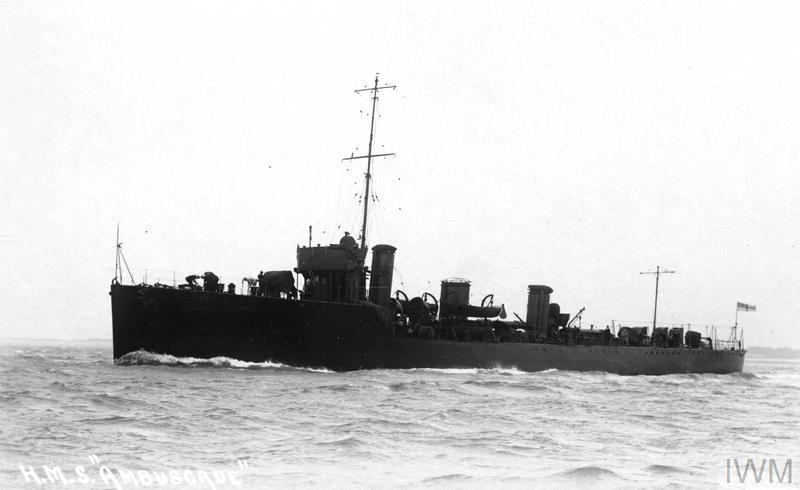
Ambuscade in WWI

On commissioning, Ambuscade, with her sister ships, joined the 4th Destroyer Flotilla of the Royal Navy Home Fleet, based at Portsmouth. On the outbreak of the First World War, the 4th Flotilla, including Ambuscade, became part of the Grand Fleet.

On 15 December 1914, German battlecruisers, supported by the battleships of the main German High Seas Fleet set out on a raid against the coastal towns of Scarborough, Whitby and Hartlepool, with the intent of drawing out units of the British Grand Fleet, where they could be engaged by the battleships of the High Seas Fleet. The British, aware from radio intercepts that the Germans were planning a raid with their battlecruisers (but not that they were supported by the whole of the High Seas Fleet), sent out the battlecruiser squadron under Vice Admiral David Beatty with four battlecruisers and the Second Battle Squadron, commanded by Vice Admiral Sir George Warrender, with six battleships, to oppose the raid. Ambuscade was one of seven destroyers that sailed in support of the British battlecruiser squadron. At 05:15 on 16 December, the lead ship of the British destroyers, Lynx, spotted a German destroyer, V155 (part of the screen of the High Seas Fleet) and set off with the other destroyers in pursuit of the German ship. In a brief exchange of fire, V155 hit Lynx twice, with Lynx turning away due to a jammed propeller, and then hit Ambuscade once below the waterline, forcing her to drop out of line with heavy flooding. Clashes between the British destroyers and the destroyers and cruisers of the High Seas Fleet's screen continued, causing further serious damage to Lynx and to Hardy, but the encounters caused Admiral Friedrich von Ingenohl, fearing that the whole Grand Fleet was at sea, to withdraw.

On 21 April 1916, the Grand Fleet sailed on a sortie where it would patrol off the Danish coast with the intention of distracting German attention from Russian minelaying operations in the Baltic Sea. Heavy fog was encountered, however, and Ambuscade was involved in a collision with the destroyers Ardent and Hardy, with Ardent being damaged severely enough that she had to be towed stern first back to port, while collisions also occurred between the battlecruisers Australia and New Zealand, and between the battleship Neptune and a neutral merchant ship.

Ambuscade took part in the Battle of Jutland on 31 May/1 June 1916, sailing under the command of Commander Gordon A. Coles as one of 19 ships of the 4th Destroyer Flotilla in support of the Grand Fleet. During the fleet action on the evening of 31 May, the 4th Flotilla was deployed on the port side of the battleships of the Grand Fleet, on the unengaged side. During the night, the 4th Flotilla, including Ambuscade, took part in a series of attacks against the escaping German fleet. In the first attack (at about 23:30 hr), the flotilla encountered German battleships and cruisers, with the flotilla leader Tipperary being badly damaged by German shells (mainly from the battleship Westfalen) and later sinking, while Spitfire collided with the German battleship Nassau and the German cruiser Elbing was rammed by the battleship Posen, with Elbing later being scuttled. None of the nine torpedoes fired by the 4th Flotilla in that attack hit. Shortly afterwards (about 23:50), the flotilla, now led by Broke again encountered the same group of battleships and cruisers. Broke was badly damaged by fire from the cruiser Rostock and Westfalen, and collided with the destroyer Sparrowhawk, which was also rammed by Contest and was later scuttled. Rostock was hit by a single torpedo, fired by Ambuscade or Contest, and was also later scuttled. At about 00:10 hr, a third attack was made, with Fortune being sunk and Porpoise being damaged, with none of the five torpedoes fired by the British destroyers, including Ambuscade's last, striking home. By now, the flotilla had completely split up, but was to lose a fourth ship when Ardent, mistaking the German ships for British ships, was sunk by fire from German battleships.

The 4th Flotilla, including Ambuscade, left the Grand Fleet and moved to the Humber in July 1916, with the role of protecting British minesweepers and deterring German minelayers off the East coast of England. Late in the year, in a response to the Battle of Dover Strait, where a raid by German torpedo boats on the Dover Strait resulted in the loss of the destroyer HMS Flirt, several drifters, it was decided to strengthen British naval forces in the English Channel. The 4th Flotilla was transferred to Portsmouth for anti-submarine operations while Ambuscade was one of five destroyers that were transferred from the 4th to the 6th Destroyer Flotilla, part of the Dover Patrol, to reinforce the defences of the Dover Strait. Ambuscade joined the 6th Flotilla on 21 November 1916. On the night of 25/26 February 1917, German torpedo boats attempted another raid against the Dover Barrage and Allied shipping in the Dover Straits, with one flotilla attacking the Barrage and a half flotilla of torpedo boats operating off the Kent coast. Ambuscade was one of a group of destroyers and cruisers protecting shipping anchored in the Downs. The German force sent against the Downs was spotted near the north entrance to the Downs, prior to shelling Margate and Westgate-on-Sea. While the division of ships including Ambuscade sortied against this force, they did not manage to find the German force. The southern German force withdrew following an exchange of gunfire with the destroyer Laverock. Ambuscade was again part of the force protecting the Downs when the Germans raided again on the night of 17/18 March 1917. Again, the German plan involved multiple attacks, against the Dover Barrage and off the Kent coast. The destroyer Paragon was sunk during the German attack against the Barrage, with Llewellyn being torpedoed but surviving when investigating the attack. The northern German force torpedoed and sunk a merchant ship (SS Greypoint) anchored outside the entrance to the Downs, and then shelled Ramsgate and Broadstairs before withdrawing. They were spotted by the British torpedo boat TB 4 which signaled for help, summoning the naval force protecting the Downs, including Ambuscade, but again the German force managed to escape without being engaged.

On 4 April 1917 Ambuscade left the 6th Flotilla, rejoining the 4th Flotilla, now based at Devonport and employed on convoy escort duties. On 14 May 1918, Ambuscade, on patrol with Christopher and Cockatrice, detected a possible submarine contact with her hydrophone. She and Cockatrice attacked with depth charges with no apparent result. Ambuscade was still part of the 4th Destroyer Flotilla in August 1918, but by the end of the war had joined the Northern Patrol Force based at Dundee. By June 1919, Ambuscade had been reduced to reserve at Devonport.

== Disposal ==
She was sold for scrap to Petersen & Albeck of Denmark on 6 September 1921.

== Pennant numbers ==
Pennant number	From	To
H62	6 December 1914	1 January 1918
H05	1 January 1918	Early 1919
H54	Early 1919	6 May 1921
