= HMS Victor (1913) =

Destroyer of the Royal Navy

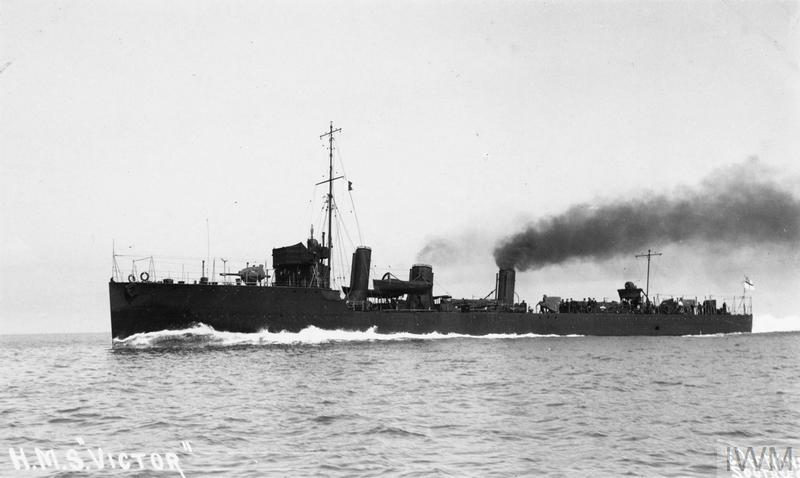

History

United Kingdom
- Name: HMS Victor
- Builder: John I. Thornycroft & Company, Woolston
- Laid down: 1 April 1912
- Launched: 28 November 1913
- Completed: June 1914
- Fate: Sold for scrap 20 January 1923

General characteristics
- Class & type: Acasta-class destroyer
- Displacement: 928 long tons (943 t)
- Length: 265 ft 3 in (80.8 m) oa
- Beam: 26 ft 6 in (8.1 m)
- Draught: 9 ft 3 in (2.8 m)
- Installed power: 22,500 shp (16,778 kW)
- Propulsion: Yarrow-type water-tube boilers; 2 shaft Parson steam turbines
- Speed: 31 knots (57 km/h; 36 mph)
- Complement: 73
- Armament: 3 × QF 4 in (102 mm) Mark IV guns; 1 × QF 2 pdr pom-pom Mk. II; 2 × single tubes for 21 in (533 mm) torpedoes

HMS Victor was an Acasta-class destroyer of the British Royal Navy, which was built by Thornycroft between 1912 and 1914, being launched on 28 November 1913 and completed in June 1914. The ship was a "builder's special", built to Thornycroft's detailed design rather than to the standard Admiralty design.

Victor served throughout the First World War, initially operating as part of the Grand Fleet, but later carrying out anti-submarine and convoy escort duties. Victor was sold for scrap in January 1923.

== Construction and design ==
For its 1911–1912 shipbuilding programme for the Royal Navy, the British Admiralty, developed the Acasta-class destroyer, an improved derivative of the previous programme's Acheron class, with higher speed and a uniform gun armament of three 4-inch (102 mm) guns. The Admiralty placed orders for 20 Acastas with 12 ships to the standard Admiralty design, and 8 more as builder's specials, built to the detailed designs of shipyards specialising in destroyer construction. Five specials were ordered from John I. Thornycroft & Company, with four (Paragon, Porpoise, Unity and Victor to a common design, and the fifth, Hardy, intended as a testbed for diesel propulsion, to a further modified design.

Victor was 265 feet 3 inches (80.8 m) long overall and 257 feet 0 inches (78.3 m) between perpendiculars, with a beam of 29 feet 6 inches (9.0 m) and a draught of 9 feet 3 inches (2.8 m). Displacement was 928 long tons (943 t). Four Yarrow boilers fed steam to Parsons steam turbines rated at 22,500 shaft horsepower (16,778 kW), giving a design speed of 31 knots (57 km/h; 36 mph). The ship had a crew of 73 officers and ratings.

The ship's main gun armament consisted of three 4-inch (102 mm) QF Mark IV guns, with 120 rounds of ammunition carried per gun. Two 21-inch (533 mm) torpedo tubes were fitted, while two reload torpedoes could be carried. The ship was fitted with a 2-pounder "pom-pom" anti-aircraft autocannon during the First World War.

Victor was laid down at Thornycoft's Woolston shipyard on 1 April 1913 and launched on 28 November 1913. In 1912, as part of a general reorganisation of the Royal Navy's destroyers into alphabetical classes, the Acastas became the K class, and in 1913, it was decided to switch to names beginning with the class letter, with Victor being allocated the name Kingston, but this plan was abandoned for the class, (Note: It was considered unlucky to rename ships after they had been launched, which would also create considerable administrative problems. In addition, Winston Churchill, First Lord of the Admiralty noted that the names allocated to the Ks "are not good names".) and Victor completed under her original name in June 1914, being delivered to Portsmouth naval base on 12 June 1914.

== Service ==
On commissioning, Victor joined her sister ships in the 4th Destroyer Flotilla, based at Portsmouth. On the outbreak of the First World War, the 4th Flotilla, including Victor, became part of the Grand Fleet.

Victor was still part of the 4th Flotilla on 24 April 1916 when the flotilla sortied with the Grand Fleet from Scapa Flow in response to movements of the German fleet, which resulted in the Bombardment of Yarmouth and Lowestoft. Heavy seas meant that the destroyers could not keep up with the battleships of the Grand Fleet, and were left behind. Even so, the Grand Fleet could not catch up with the German force. Unlike most of the 4th Flotilla, Victor did not take part in the Battle of Jutland, remaining in port.

On 5 July 1916, Victor and sister ship Unity were ordered to escort the armoured cruiser Hampshire that was carrying the secretary of state for war, Field Marshal Lord Kitchener, on a mission to Russia. Hampshire was ordered to take a route to the west of Orkney, which would give some protection from a gale from the north-east, making it easier for the destroyers to keep up with Hampshire in the heavy seas, but the wing changed, coming from north-north-west, so that the ships were steaming directly into the storm. The two destroyers could not cope with the heavy seas and were ordered to return to base, as the weather meant that submarine attack was unlikely, but at 7.40 pm, just over an hour after Victor was ordered back to base, Hampshire stuck a mine and quickly sank. Victor, together with Unity, Owl and Midge, was ordered out of Scapa Flow to search for survivors, reaching the scene of the sinking by 10.30 pm. They were later joined in the search by five more destroyers, (Note: Opal, Menace, Munster, Napier and Oak.) two yachts, two trawlers and a tug, but the searching ships found only wreckage and dead bodies, with only 13 survivors being washed ashore, one of whom later died. 650 men died, including Kitchener.

In July 1916, the 4th Flotilla, including Victor, left the Grand Fleet, moving to the Humber, to counter German minelayers and to protect British minesweepers in the North Sea. On 18 August 1916, the Grand Fleet sailed in response to a sortie by the German High Seas Fleet. The two fleets failed to meet each other before the Germans withdrew, but as the Grand Fleet was heading for home, the light cruiser Falmouth was torpedoed twice by the German submarine U-66. Victor, along with Ambuscade, Porpoise and Unity, set out from the Humber to meet Falmouth. Despite the heavy destroyer escort, which grew to nine destroyers, Falmouth was struck by two more torpedoes from U-63 on 20 August and eventually sank on 21 August near Flamborough Head.

Following the Battle of Dover Strait, where a raid by German torpedo boats on the Dover Strait resulted in the loss of the destroyer HMS Flirt and several drifters, it was decided to strengthen British naval forces in the English Channel. Victor was one of five destroyers of the Fourth Flotilla transferred to the 6th Destroyer Flotilla, part of the Dover Patrol, serving between 2 December 1916 and 8 March 1917. Victor then re-joined the 4th Flotilla, which was now based at Devonport, and largely employed on anti-submarine searches and patrols. In June 1917, the Admiralty decided to introduce a comprehensive system of convoys for ocean traffic, with destroyers or other suitable ships escorting the convoy through the areas where there was significant danger of submarine attack. The 4th Flotilla was used to provide convoy escort for convoys coming from the south. Victor remained part of the 4th Flotilla until the end of the war on 11 November 1918.

== Disposal ==
By January 1919, Victor was listed as temporarily based at The Nore, and by March was listed as in reserve at the same location. Victor was reduced to a Care and Maintenance status on the Nore on 4 February 1920. Victor was sold for scrap on 20 January 1923.

== Pennant numbers ==
Pennant number	Date
H36	6 December 1914
H6A	1 January 1918
H04	Early 1919
