= HMS Contest (1913) =

British naval ship

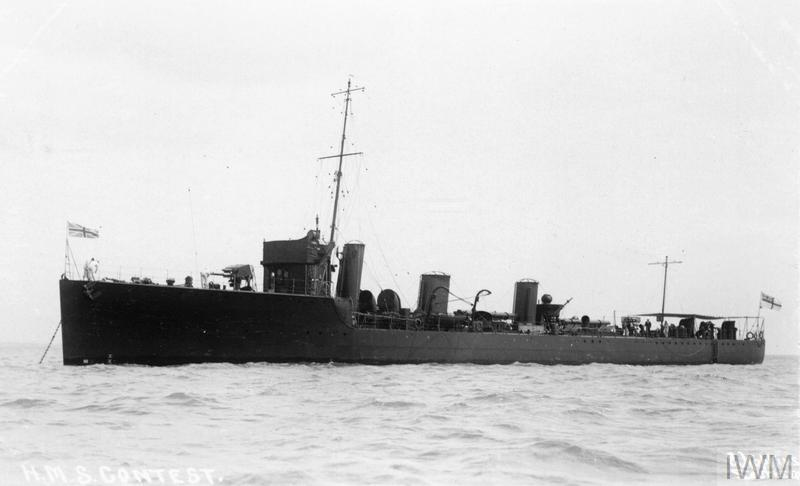
- HMS Contest

History

United Kingdom
- Name: HMS Contest
- Builder: Hawthorn Leslie and Company, Newcastle upon Tyne
- Laid down: 26 December 1911
- Launched: 7 January 1913
- Completed: June 1913
- Fate: Sank 18 September 1917

General characteristics
- Class & type: Acasta-class destroyer
- Displacement: 984 tons
- Length: 267 ft 6 in (81.5 m)
- Beam: 26 ft 9 in (8.2 m)
- Draught: 9 ft 6 in (2.9 m)
- Installed power: 24,500 hp (18,270 kW)
- Propulsion: Yarrow-type water-tube boilers; 2 shaft Brown-Curtis steam turbines
- Speed: 32 knots (59 km/h; 37 mph)
- Complement: 77
- Armament: 3 × QF 4 in (102 mm) L/40 Mark IV guns, mounting P Mk. IX; 2 × single tubes for 21 in (533 mm) torpedoes

HMS Contest was an Acasta-class destroyer of the British Royal Navy. She was built by Hawthorn Leslie and Company at their Newcastle upon Tyne shipyard, and was launched on 7 January 1913, being completed in June that year. Contest served in the First World War, and supported the Grand Fleet until 1916. The destroyer took part in the Battle of Jutland on 31 May/1 June 1916. Later that year, Contest moved to The Humber, and then to the English Channel for anti-submarine and escort duties. She was torpedoed and sunk by a German submarine on 18 September 1917.

== Construction and design ==
Contest was one of three Acasta-class destroyers ordered by the British Admiralty from the Hawthorn Leslie shipyard under the 1911–1912 shipbuilding programme, with a total of 20 Acastas (12, including Contest to the standard Admiralty design and eight more as builder's specials).

The Acastas were larger and more powerful than the Acorn-class destroyers ordered under the previous year's programme. Greater speed was wanted to match large fast destroyers building for foreign navies, while a larger radius of action was desired. The destroyers built to the Admiralty standard design were 267 feet 6 inches (81.5 m) long overall and 260 feet 0 inches (79.2 m) between perpendiculars, with a beam of 27 feet 0 inches (8.2 m) and a draught of 10 feet 5 inches (3.2 m). Displacement of the Admiralty design Acastas was 892 long tons (906 t) Normal and 1,072 long tons (1,089 t) Deep load. (Note: The April 1913 Navy List states Contest's displacement as 935 long tons (950 t))

Four Yarrow water-tube boilers fed steam to Parsons steam turbines which drove two propeller shafts. The machinery was rated to 24,500 shaft horsepower (18,300 kW) giving a design speed of 29 knots (54 km/h; 33 mph). (Note: While the nominal speed of the Acastas at 29 knots was the same as the Acorns, this speed was required at full load displacement rather than the lighter displacements previously used. A trial speed of 29.5 knots (54.6 km/h; 33.9 mph) at full load corresponded to a speed of 32 knots (59 km/h; 37 mph) at the lighter loads previously specified.) Three funnels were fitted. The ship had an endurance of 1,540 nautical miles (2,850 km; 1,770 mi) at 15 knots (28 km/h; 17 mph).

Armament consisted of three 4-inch (102 mm) guns mounted on the ship's centreline, with one forward and two aft, and two 21-inch (533 mm) torpedo tubes. Two reload torpedoes were carried. The ship had a crew of 73 officers and ratings.

Contest was laid down at Hawthorn Leslie's Hebburn shipyard on 26 December 1911, and was launched on 7 January 1913. In 1913 the Admiralty decided to reclassify the Royal Navy's destroyers into alphabetical classes, with the Acasta class becoming the K class. New names were allocated to the ships of the K class, with the name Kittiwake being reserved for Contest, but the ships were not renamed. (Note: It was considered unlucky to rename ships after they had been launched, which would also create considerable administrative problems. In addition, Winston Churchill, First Lord of the Admiralty noted that the names allocated to the Ks "are not good names".) Contest reached a speed of 29.7 kn (34.2 mph; 55.0 km/h) during sea trials. Contest was completed in June 1913.

== Service ==
Contest joined the 4th Destroyer Flotilla on commissioning. On 24 June 1913, Contest helped escort the French battleship Courbet, carrying the President of France, Raymond Poincaré to Portsmouth, meeting Courbet mid-Channel.

At the outbreak of the First World War, Contest, along with the rest of the 4th Flotilla, joined the newly established Grand Fleet, based at Scapa Flow. In February 1915, Contest was one of a number of Grand Fleet destroyers ordered to escort merchant ships carrying troops of the 1st Canadian Division from Avonmouth to St Nazaire. Although the destroyers failed to rendezvous with the convoy, it reached France without any losses. On 13 February, Contest, Christopher, Hardy and Owl were putting into Barrow harbour to refuel on the way back to Scotland, when they were suddenly signalled to turn away to avoid a ship leaving the harbour. Contest, Christopher and Owl ran aground while attempting to turn in the narrow approach channel, remaining aground until the next day. Contest was repaired on the Clyde. On 2 January 1916, the battleship St Vincent set out from Scapa Flow to Liverpool for refit, and was meant to be accompanied by Contest and Christopher to The Minch, and then meet the battleship Africa and escort her back to Scapa. The weather was too heavy to allow the destroyers to accompany St Vincent, however, and they did not leave Scapa until 3 January. The weather forced the two destroyers to seek shelter at Stornoway on 5 January, however, and Africa reached Scapa Flow on 6 January without escort.

Contest took part in the Battle of Jutland on 31 May/1 June 1916, sailing as one of 19 ships of the 4th Destroyer Flotilla in support of the Grand Fleet. During the daytime engagement between the fleets, the 4th Flotilla was deployed on the port side of the battleships of the Grand Fleet, on the unengaged side. Contest took part in several engagements with German forces during the night, with the 4th Flotilla and the German 7th Torpedo Boat Flotilla briefly clashing at about 22:00, with Contest, Fortune and Garland firing a few shots at the German ships and the Germans firing torpedoes, with no damage on either side before contact was lost. At about 23:30, the 4th Fotilla encountered German battleships and cruisers, with the flotilla leader Tipperary being badly damaged by German shells (mainly from the battleship Westfalen) and later sinking, while Spitfire collided with the German battleship Nassau and the German cruiser Elbing was rammed by the battleship Posen, with Elbing later being scuttled. Contest fired one torpedo before turning away, but none of the nine torpedoes launched in this clash hit their targets. Shortly afterwards (about 23:50), the flotilla, now led by Broke again encountered the same group of battleships and cruisers. Broke was badly damaged by fire from Westfalen and the cruiser Rostock and collided with the destroyer Sparrowhawk and then Contest also collided with Sparrowhawk, cutting off Sparrowhawk's stern. Contest suffered damage to her bow that limited her speed to 20 kn (23 mph; 37 km/h), while Sparrowhawk had to be scuttled. Rostock was hit by a single torpedo, fired by Ambuscade or Contest, and was also later scuttled.

In July 1916, the 4th Flotilla, which had suffered heavy losses at Jutland, was replaced in the Grand Fleet by the newly established 14th Destroyer Flotilla, and the 4th Flotilla, including Contest was transferred to the Humber. The flotilla's duties included countering German minelaying operations and protecting British minesweepers in the North Sea. In November 1916, the 4th Flotilla, including Contest, was sent to Portsmouth for anti-submarine operations in response to German submarine attacks in the Channel. On 28 November, Contest, together with Cockatrice and Spitfire, was sent from Portsmouth to hunt a submarine that had sunk three merchant ships off The Owers that morning, and had been spotted and fired at by the drifter Sailor King, but they did not find the submarine. On 16 December, the German submarine UB-38 attacked the British schooner Englishman off the coast of Cornwall, but was driven off by the armed yacht Venetia and a patrol vessel. Contest, Achates and Owl, on patrol off The Lizard, set out to hunt for the submarine, deploying explosive paravanes, but although one of Achates's paravanes detonated during the search, UB-38 escaped unharmed. On 20 December the same three destroyers were ordered to patrol off Ushant in response to U-boat sightings.

By March 1917, the 4th Flotilla had moved to Devonport. On 2 May 1917, the German submarine UC-48 sank the fishing smack United off Cornwall. Several hours later, Contest had just picked up the survivors of the snack when a submarine broke surface about 2,000 yd (1,800 m) away. Contest headed for the submarine and dropped four depth charges at a disturbance in the water. UC-48 escaped the attack, however.

On 18 September 1917, Contest was part of the escort of a America-bound convoy out of Plymouth, when the merchant ship City of Lincoln was hit by a torpedo at 17:45. City of Lincoln remained afloat, and Contest was ordered to stay with the damaged ship until tugs arrived. At 18:15, Contest was hit by a single torpedo which caused the destroyer's depth charges and then her aft magazine to explode, wrecking the stern of the ship. With no steering, Contest then collided with City of Lincoln sustaining further damage, and began to slowly sink. The crew abandoned ship, with 35 of the destroyer's crew killed or missing, plus three of City of Lincoln's crew who had been taken aboard the destroyer. (Note: Sources differ as to what submarine sank Contest. Hepper says that U-32 was almost certainly responsible, while U-boat.net credits U-106. Both submarines were sunk before they reached port.)

== Pennant numbers ==
Pennant number	Date
H63	1914
H26	1917
