= HMS Midge =

British Royal Navy destroyer

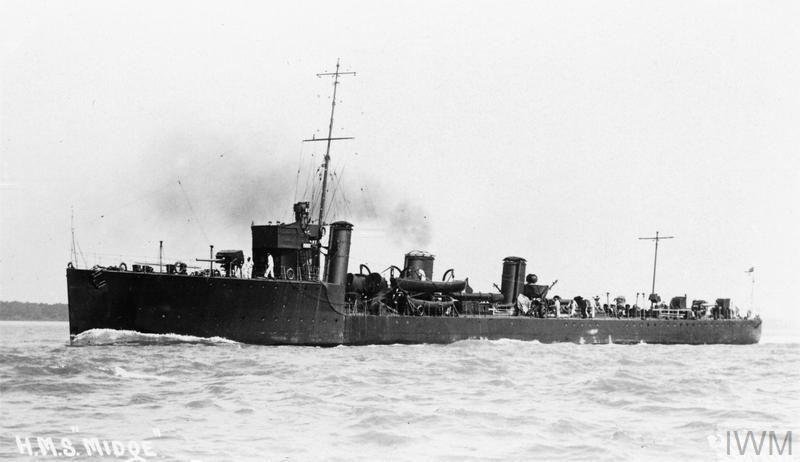
- HMS Midge

History

United Kingdom
- Name: HMS Midge
- Builder: London and Glasgow Shipbuilding Company, Govan
- Laid down: 1 April 1912
- Launched: 22 May 1913
- Completed: March 1914
- Fate: Sold to be to be broken up on 5 November 1922

General characteristics
- Class & type: Acasta-class destroyer
- Displacement: 892 long tons (906 t) (normal)
- Length: 267 ft 6 in (81.5 m)
- Beam: 27 ft 0 in (8.2 m)
- Draught: 10 ft 5 in (3.2 m)
- Installed power: 4 Yarrow boilers, 24,500 shp (18,300 kW)
- Propulsion: Parsons steam turbines, 2 shafts
- Speed: 29 knots (54 km/h)
- Complement: 73
- Armament: 3 × QF 4 in (102 mm) guns; 2 × 21 in (530 mm) torpedo tubes

HMS Midge was an Acasta class (later K-class) destroyer of the British Royal Navy. The Acasta class was larger and more powerful than the preceding Acorn class. They were the last Royal Navy destroyers named without a theme, although it was proposed to rename them all with names beginning with the letter K. Had this happened, Midge would have been renamed Keitloa. Launched in 1913, Midge joined the Fourth Destroyer Flotilla, which, at the beginning of the First World War, became part of the Grand Fleet. Midge subsequently participated in the Battle of Jutland in 1916, supporting the Second Cruiser Squadron. The destroyer spent the remainder of the war hunting for German submarines and protecting shipping from submarine attack, including, in 1917, escorting convoys of troopships carrying Portuguese troops in the Bay of Biscay. Following the 1918 Armistice that ended the war, Midge was transferred to reserve and was sold to be to be broken up in 1922.

== Design and development ==
Under the 1911–1912 shipbuilding programme for the Royal Navy, the British Admiralty ordered 20 Acasta-class destroyers, with 12 to the standard Admiralty design and 8 more builder's specials, with detailed design left to the builders. Midge was built to the standard Admiralty design. The Acasta class destroyers were larger and more powerful than the Acorn-class destroyers ordered under the previous year's programme. Greater speed was wanted to match large fast destroyers building for foreign navies, while a larger radius of action was desired.

The destroyers built to the Admiralty standard design were 267 feet 6 inches (81.5 m) long overall and 260 feet 0 inches (79.2 m) between perpendiculars, with a beam of 27 feet 0 inches (8.2 m) and a draught of 10 feet 5 inches (3.2 m). Displacement was 892 long tons (906 t) normal and 1,072 long tons (1,089 t) at deep load. Four Yarrow boilers fed steam to direct drive Parsons steam turbines rated at 24,500 shaft horsepower (18,300 kW) and driving two shafts. This gave a speed of 29 knots (54 km/h; 33 mph). (Note: While the nominal speed of the Acastas at 29 knots was the same as the Acorns, this speed was required at full load displacement rather than the lighter displacements previously used. A trial speed of 29.5 knots (54.6 km/h; 33.9 mph) at full load corresponded to a speed of 32 knots (59 km/h; 37 mph) at the lighter loads previously specified.) Three funnels were fitted. The destroyer had an endurance of 1,540 nautical miles (2,850 km; 1,770 mi) at 15 knots (28 km/h; 17 mph). The ship's complement was 73 officers and ratings.

Armament consisted of three QF 4-inch (102 mm) guns mounted on the ship's centreline, with one forward and two aft, with 120 rounds of ammunition carried per gun, together with two 21-inch (533 mm) torpedo tubes. Two reload torpedoes were carried. The ship was authorised to be fitted with a Maxim anti-aircraft gun, and this was complemented in the First World War by refitting the aft gun to be on a "trap door" high-angle mounting. In 1916, the facility to carry two Type D depth charges was added. In 1918 the torpedo tubes and one of the 4-inch guns were removed to allow a heavier depth charge armament to be carried. The vessel was soon carrying between 30 and 50 depth charges.

== Construction and career ==
Midge was laid down at London and Glasgow Shipbuilding Company's Govan shipyard on 1 April 1912 and was launched on 22 May 1913 with the yard number 365. The yard was owned by Harland & Wolff. The vessel was the fifth to be given the name, first used in 1856. In 1913 the Admiralty decided to reclassify the Royal Navy's destroyers into alphabetical classes, with the Acasta class becoming the K class. New names were allocated to the ships of the K class, with the name Keitloa being reserved for Midge, but the ships were not renamed. (Note: It was considered unlucky to rename ships after they had been launched, which would also create considerable administrative problems. In addition, Winston Churchill, First Lord of the Admiralty noted that the names allocated to the Ks "are not good names".) Midge was completed in March 1914. Following commissioning, Midge joined the Fourth Destroyer Flotilla based at Portsmouth.

On the outbreak of the First World War in August 1914, the Fourth Destroyer Flotilla, including Midge, became part of the Grand Fleet based at Scapa Flow. The destroyer was involved in searching for German submarines, including an unsuccessful search off Kinnaird Head on 8 August 1915. In this instance, the search ended with the discovery of a minefield, which sank the destroyer Lynx. On 24 April 1916, the destroyer was part of the Grand Fleet deployed to intercept German raiders undertaking the bombardment of Yarmouth and Lowestoft. The slow speed of the destroyers in the choppy seas meant that they were left behind and did not encounter the German fleet.

Midge was one of 19 ships of the flotilla that sailed in support of the Grand Fleet during the Battle of Jutland on 31 May and 1 June 1916. The destroyer was to screen the cruisers of the Second Cruiser Squadron. During the night of 31 May, the flotilla had a number of engagements with the German battle fleet. At about 22:30 hours, the destroyers encountered the German cruisers and battleships. The flotilla leader Tipperary was badly damaged by German shells, mainly from the battleship Westfalen, and later sank while the leading ships in the British formation fired a total of nine torpedoes, none of which hit. Subsequently, the flotilla damaged the cruiser Rostock, which was later scuttled, for the loss of the destroyer Sparrowhawk. Midge, along with Hardy, Mischief and Owl, remained with the cruisers during the action.

The flotilla returned to Scapa Flow on 2 June. A few days later, Midge joined the unsuccessful search for the armoured cruiser Hampshire, sunk by a German mine off the coast of Mainland, Orkney. Hampshire had been sailing to Russia without escort with the secretary of state for war, Field Marshal Lord Kitchener, but had sunk after hitting a mine and only 13 individuals, which did not include the secretary of state, survived. In order to counter German minelayers and to protect British minesweepers in the North Sea, the Fourth Destroyer Flotilla, including Midge, transferred to Immingham on the Humber estuary at the end of July 1916. The flotilla, including Midge, moved again to Portsmouth in November that year. On 28 November, the destroyer escorted £4,000,000 of gold from Cherbourg. Soon after, the destroyer resumed submarine hunting. The patrols proved successful and no ships were lost for the remainder of the year.

On 27 January 1917, Midge, along with sister ships Cockatrice, Garland and Owl, was sent to Lisbon as a result of the presence of German submarines in the Bay of Biscay. The submarines threatened troopships carrying Portuguese troops to France, but the additional escort meant that, on 30 January, a convoy of three ships sailed without attack. On 1 February, the destroyer was back in Plymouth hunting for submarines off the coast of Cornwall. On 26 May, the ship made an unsuccessful attack on the submarine UC-41. Midge remained part of the Fourth Destroyer Flotilla at the end of the war on 11 November 1918.

After the Armistice that ended the war, the Royal Navy returned to a peacetime level of strength and both the number of ships and personnel needed to be reduced to save money. All pre-war destroyers were quickly withdrawn from active service. Midge was transferred to reserve at The Nore. Reduced to Care and Maintenance status on 4 February 1920, the vessel was sold to Granton Shipbuilding on 5 November 1922 to be broken up.

== Pennant numbers ==
Penant numbers
Pennant number	Date
H13	December 1914
H40	September 1915
H79	January 1918
H03	January 1919
