= HMS Owl =

HMS Owl has been used by the British Royal Navy as the name of one ship and one shore establishment:

- HMS Owl (1913), an Acasta-class destroyer launched in 1913 and scrapped in 1921.
- HMS Owl (shore establishment) was the name assigned to RAF Fearn when it was taken over as a torpedo training school by the Royal Navy on 1 August 1942. The base closed in July 1946.
