= Brazilian destroyer Maranhão =

At least two ships of the Brazilian Navy have borne the name Maranhão

- Brazilian destroyer Maranhão (1927), an Acasta-class destroyer launched in 1913 as HMS Porpoise she was acquired by Brazil in 1920 as Alexandrino de Alencar. Renamed Maranhão in 1927 she was discarded in 1946
- Brazilian destroyer Maranhão (D33) a Fletcher-class destroyer launched in 1944 as USS Shields, acquired by Brazil in 1972 and scrapped in 1990
