= HMS Unity (1913) =

British Royal Navy destroyer

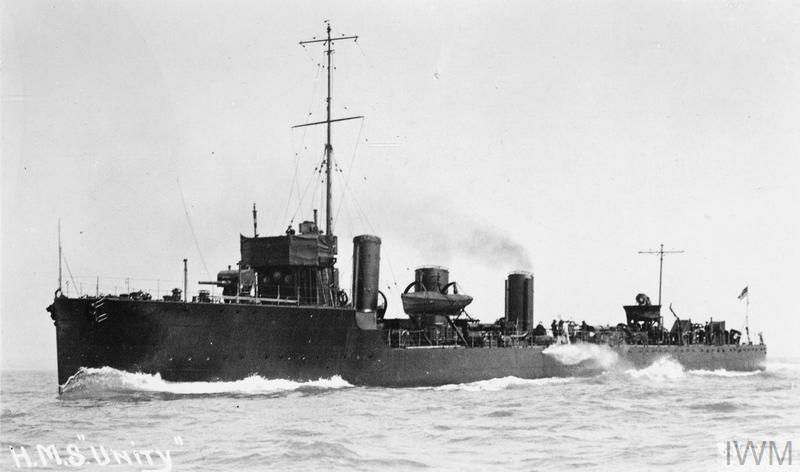
- HMS Unity

History

United Kingdom
- Name: HMS Unity
- Builder: Thornycroft, Woolston
- Laid down: 1 April 1912
- Launched: 18 September 1913
- Completed: June 1914
- Fate: Sold to be to be broken up on 25 October 1922

General characteristics
- Class & type: Acasta-class destroyer
- Displacement: 934 long tons (949 t)
- Length: 265 ft 3 in (80.8 m) oa
- Beam: 26 ft 6 in (8.1 m)
- Draught: 9 ft 3 in (2.8 m)
- Installed power: Yarrow water-tube boilers, 22,500 shp (16,778 kW)
- Propulsion: Parsons steam turbines, 2 shafts
- Speed: 31 knots (57 km/h; 36 mph)
- Complement: 73
- Armament: 3 × QF 4 in (102 mm) guns; 1 × 0.303-inch (7.7 mm) Maxim anti-aircraft gun; 2 × single tubes for 21 in (533 mm) torpedoes

HMS Unity was an Acasta class (later K-class) destroyer of the British Royal Navy. The Acasta class was larger and more powerful than the preceding Acorn class. The Acasta class was larger and more powerful than the preceding Acorn class. They were the last Royal Navy destroyers named without a theme, although it was proposed to rename them all with names beginning with the letter K. Had this happened, Unity would have been renamed Kinsale. Launched in 1913, Unity joined the Fourth Destroyer Flotilla, which, at the beginning of the First World War, became part of the Grand Fleet. Unity participated in the Battle of Jutland in 1916, supporting the Second Cruiser Squadron and, after briefly escorting the armoured cruiser Hampshire, carrying the secretary of state for war, Field Marshal Lord Kitchener, to Russia, in the search from survivors of when the ship was sunk by a mine. The destroyer subsequently undertook other escort duties, both for individual ships and convoys, After the 1918 Armistice that ended the war, Unity was transferred to reserve and was sold to be to be broken up in 1922.

== Design and development ==
Under the 1911–1912 shipbuilding programme for the Royal Navy, the British Admiralty ordered 20 Acasta-class destroyers, with 12 to the standard Admiralty design and 8 more builder's specials, with detailed design left to the builders. Unity was one of five builder's specials ordered from Thornycroft of Southampton. (Note: Three of these ships (Paragon, Porpoise and Victor) were to the same design as Unity, while Hardy, intended as a testbed for diesel propulsion, was to a further modified design.) The Acasta class destroyers were larger and more powerful than the Acorn-class destroyers ordered under the previous year's programme. Greater speed was wanted to match large fast destroyers building for foreign navies, while a larger radius of action was desired.

The destroyer was 265 feet 3 inches (80.8 m) long overall and 257 feet (78.3 m) between perpendiculars, with a beam of 29 feet 6 inches (9.0 m) and a draught of 9 feet 2.5 inches (2.8 m). Normal displacement was 928 long tons (943 t). Four Yarrow boilers fed steam to direct drive Parsons steam turbines rated at 24,500 shaft horsepower (18,300 kW) and driving two shafts. This gave a design speed of 31 knots (57 km/h; 36 mph). Three funnels were fitted. The destroyer carried 258 tonnes (254 long tons; 284 short tons) of fuel oil which provided an endurance of 2,750 nautical miles (5,090 km; 3,160 mi) at 15 knots (28 km/h; 17 mph) and 617 nautical miles (1,143 km; 710 mi) at 30.9 knots (57.2 km/h; 35.6 mph). The ship's complement was 73 officers and ratings.

Armament consisted of three QF 4-inch (102 mm) guns mounted on the ship's centreline, with one forward and two aft, with 120 rounds of ammunition carried per gun, together with two 21-inch (533 mm) torpedo tubes. Two reload torpedoes were carried. The ship was authorised to be fitted with a 0.303-inch (7.7 mm) Maxim anti-aircraft gun. For anti-submarine warfare, initially, the destroyer carried sweeps. In 1916, the facility to carry two Type D depth charges was added. In April 1918, the torpedo tubes and one of the 4-inch guns were removed to allow a heavier depth charge armament to be carried. The vessel was soon carrying between 30 and 50 depth charges. Following trials in 1916, a fire-control system was fitted based on a training-only director.

== Construction and career ==
Unity was laid down at Thornycroft's Woolston shipyard on 1 April 1912 and was launched on 18 September 1913. The vessel was the eighth to be given the name, although the first two were captured ships. In 1913 the Admiralty decided to reclassify the Royal Navy's destroyers into alphabetical classes, with the Acasta class becoming the K class. New names were allocated to the ships of the K class, with the name Kinsale being reserved for Unity, but the ships were not renamed. (Note: It was considered unlucky to rename ships after they had been launched, which would also create considerable administrative problems. In addition, Winston Churchill, First Lord of the Admiralty noted that the names allocated to the Ks "are not good names".) Unity was completed in June 1914. Following commissioning, Unity joined the Fourth Destroyer Flotilla based at Portsmouth.

On the outbreak of the First World War in August 1914, the Fourth Destroyer Flotilla, including Unity, became part of the Grand Fleet based at Scapa Flow. On 15 December the destroyer formed part of the screening force for the a force of six battleships, four battlecruisers, four armoured cruisers and six light cruisers deployed to Dogger Bank to intercept the German fleet returning from its raid on Scarborough, Hartlepool and Whitby. Early the following morning, the destroyers were sailing east and away from the battleships when they were attacked by German destroyers. Sister ships Ambuscade and Lynx were hit. Ordered to assist the stricken destroyers, Unity turned but was immediately blocked by the German armoured cruiser Roon. The cruiser turned away to avoid any possible torpedoes and was out of range before any shots were fired. Unity was able to assist the other destroyers but was unable to take further part in the action. Unity escorted Lynx back to Newcastle. The flotilla was subsequently involved in looking for German submarines, including an unsuccessful search off Kinnaird Head on 8 August 1915. In this instance, the search ended with the discovery of a minefield, which sank Lynx. On 24 April 1916, the destroyer was part of the Grand Fleet deployed to intercept German raiders undertaking the bombardment of Yarmouth and Lowestoft. The slow speed of the destroyers in the choppy seas meant that they were left behind and did not encounter the German fleet.

Unity was one of 19 ships of the flotilla that sailed in support of the Grand Fleet during the Battle of Jutland on 31 May and 1 June 1916. The destroyer was to screen the cruisers of the Second Cruiser Squadron. During the night of 31 May, the flotilla had a number of engagements with the German battle fleet. When the destroyers encountered the German cruisers and battleships, the flotilla leader Tipperary was badly damaged by German shells, mainly from the battleship Westfalen, and later sank while the leading ships in the British formation fired a total of nine torpedoes, none of which hit, and Unity lost touch with the remainder of the flotilla in the resulting confusion. The destroyer spotted the destroyer Lydiard and eleven of the Twelfth Destroyer Flotilla. Joining this group, Unity then steamed towards the German battle fleet, although they passed ahead of it, only the last two destroyers in the line, Petard and Turbulent, encountering enemy ships. After the battle, Unity returned to Aberdeen alongside Acasta and Nonsuch on 2 June. On 5 June, the destroyer escorted, alongside Victor, the armoured cruiser Hampshire, that was carrying the secretary of state for war, Field Marshal Lord Kitchener, to Russia. The destroyers were called back as the wind and waves meant that they were not able to keep up with the cruiser. About an hour after they had returned to harbour, they were called out to search for survivors. Hampshire had sunk the following day after hitting a mine. Only 13 individuals, which did not include the secretary of state, survived.

In order to counter German minelayers and to protect British minesweepers in the North Sea, the Fourth Destroyer Flotilla, including Unity, transferred to Immingham on the Humber estuary at the end of July 1916. On 18 August 1916, the Grand Fleet sailed in response to a sortie by the German High Seas Fleet. The two fleets failed to meet each other before the Germans withdrew, but as the Grand Fleet was heading for home, the light cruiser Falmouth was torpedoed twice by the German submarine U-66. Unity, along with Ambuscade, Porpoise and Victor, set out from the Humber to meet Falmouth. Despite the heavy destroyer escort, which grew to nine destroyers, Falmouth was struck by two more torpedoes from U-63 on 20 August and eventually sank on 21 August near Flamborough Head. In September 1916, Unity was one of four destroyers of the Fourth Flotilla that were ordered to the English Channel as a result of a spurt of U-boat activity. On 12 September, Unity, along with Porpoise and Spitfire, spotted a U-boat to the northwest of Ushant, and attacked with depth charges with no result. The four destroyers returned to the Humber on 27 September.

Following the Battle of Dover Strait, where a raid by German torpedo boats on the Dover Strait resulted in the loss of the destroyer HMS Flirt and several drifters, it was decided to strengthen British naval forces in the English Channel. Unity was one of five destroyers of the Fourth Flotilla transferred to the 6th Destroyer Flotilla, part of the Dover Patrol, serving between 2 December 1916 and 4 March 1917. The destroyer then rejoined the Fourth Flotilla based at Devonport and was employed on convoy escort duties. The vessel served with the flotilla until the end of the war.

After the Armistice that ended the war, the Royal Navy returned to a peacetime level of strength and both the number of ships and personnel needed to be reduced to save money. All pre-war destroyers were quickly withdrawn from active service. Unity was transferred to reserve and returned to Portsmouth. Reduced to Care and Maintenance status on 17 October 1919, the vessel was sold to Rees of Llanelly on 25 October 1922 to be broken up.

== Pennant numbers ==
Penant numbers
Pennant number	Date
H68	December 1914
H5A	January 1918
H87	January 1919
