= HMS Owl (1913) =

Acasta-class destroyer

History

United Kingdom
- Name: HMS Owl
- Builder: London and Glasgow Shipbuilding Company
- Launched: 7 July 1913
- Fate: Sold for scrap on 5 November 1921

General characteristics
- Class & type: Acasta-class destroyer
- Displacement: 936 tons
- Length: 267 ft 6 in (81.5 m)
- Beam: 27 ft 0 in (8.2 m)
- Draught: 10 ft 6 in (3.2 m)
- Propulsion: Yarrow-type water-tube boilers; Parsons steam turbines
- Speed: 32.7 knots (60.6 km/h) during trials

HMS Owl was an Acasta-class destroyer of the Royal Navy, launched in 1913. The destroyer was part of the Grand Fleet during the First World War and took part in the Battle of Jutland. Owl survived the war and was sold for scrap in 1921.

== Construction and design ==
Owl was one of three Acasta-class destroyers ordered by the British Admiralty from the London & Glasgow Shipbuilding Company under the 1911–1912 shipbuilding programme, with a total of 20 Acastas (12, including Owl, to the standard Admiralty design and eight more as builder's specials).

The Acastas were larger and more powerful than the Acorn-class destroyers ordered under the previous year's programme. Greater speed was wanted to match large fast destroyers building for foreign navies, while a larger radius of action was desired. The destroyers built to the Admiralty standard design were 267 feet 6 inches (81.5 m) long overall and 260 feet 0 inches (79.2 m) between perpendiculars, with a beam of 27 feet 0 inches (8.2 m) and a draught of 10 feet 5 inches (3.2 m). Displacement was 892 long tons (906 t) normal and 1,072 long tons (1,089 t) at deep load. (Note: Owl was listed as having a displacement of 936 tons in 1919.)

Four Yarrow water-tube boilers fed steam to Parsons steam turbines which drove two propeller shafts. The machinery was rated to 24,500 shaft horsepower (18,270 kW) giving a design speed of 29 knots (54 km/h; 33 mph). (Note: While the nominal speed of the Acastas at 29 knots was the same as the Acorns, this speed was required at full load displacement rather than the lighter displacements previously used. A trial speed of 29.5 knots (54.6 km/h; 33.9 mph) at full load corresponded to a speed of 32 knots (59 km/h; 37 mph) at the lighter loads previously specified.) Three funnels were fitted. The ship had an endurance of 1,540 nautical miles (2,850 km; 1,770 mi) at 15 knots (28 km/h; 17 mph).

Armament consisted of three 4-inch (102 mm) guns mounted on the ship's centreline, with one forward and two aft, and two 21-inch (533 mm) torpedo tubes. Two reload torpedoes were carried. The ship had a crew of 73 officers and ratings.

Owl was laid down at London & Glasgow's Glasgow shipyard on 1 April 1912, and was launched on 7 May 1913. In 1913 the Admiralty decided to reclassify the Royal Navy's destroyers into alphabetical classes, with the Acasta class becoming the K class. New names were allocated to the ships of the K class, with the name Killer being reserved for Oak, but the ships were not renamed. (Note: It was considered unlucky to rename ships after they had been launched, which would also create considerable administrative problems. In addition, Winston Churchill, First Lord of the Admiralty noted that the names allocated to the Ks "are not good names".) Oak reached a speed of 32.7 knots (60.6 km/h; 37.6 mph) during sea trials. She was completed in April 1914.

== Service ==
Owl joined the Fourth Destroyer Flotilla upon commissioning and remained part of that flotilla on the outbreak of the First World War as the flotilla joined the newly created Grand Fleet.

In February 1915,Owl was deployed from Scapa Flow to the Irish Sea as part of a force of two divisions of destroyers sent to hunt the German submarine U-21. By the time the destroyers reached the Irish Sea and began anti-submarine patrols, U-21 had already left the area. Owl's division was soon ordered to return to Scapa, and on 13 February Owl, Hardy, Contest and Christopher were putting into Barrow harbour to refuel, when they were suddenly signalled to turn away to avoid a ship leaving the harbour. Owl, Contest and Christopher ran aground while attempting to turn in the narrow approach channel, remaining aground until the next day. Owl remained at Barrow for repair until 16 February, then sailed to Aberdeen to have her propellers replaced, rejoining the Grand Fleet on 26 February.

Owl was present at the Battle of Jutland on 31 May/1 June 1916. She was detached from the 4th Flotilla to form part of the destroyer screen for the armoured cruisers of the 2nd Cruiser Squadron.

On 5 June 1916 the cruiser Hampshire left Scapa Flow carrying the Secretary of State for War, Lord Kitchener who was leading a military mission to Russia. Three hours after leaving Scapa, Hampshire struck a German mine and quickly sank. Owl was part of a large force of ships (consisting of nine destroyers, two yachts and a tug) that set out from Scapa to search for survivors, but only twelve survivors were washed ashore, with 650 men, including Lord Kitchener, killed.

In July 1916, the 4th Flotilla left the Grand Fleet, moving to the Humber, to counter German minelayers and to protect British minesweepers in the North Sea. The flotilla, including Owl, moved again to Portsmouth in November that year. On 16 December 1916 Owl was patrolling with Achates and Contest off the Lizard when they received a report of a German submarine (actually UB-38) attacking shipping off the Cornish coast. They searched for the submarine, deploying explosive paravanes, but although one of Achates's paravanes detonated during the search, UB-38 escaped unharmed. On 20 December the same three destroyers were ordered to patrol off Ushant in response to U-boat sightings. In January 1917 Owl, Cockatrice, Garland and Midge were sent to Lisbon as a result of the presence of German submarines in the Bay of Biscay, escorting Portuguese merchant ships, continuing these operations into March.

The 4th Flotilla was transferred to Devonport in spring 1917. Regular convoy operations on the North Atlantic route began in July 1917, with the destroyers of the 4th Flotilla being used as escorts to escort incoming convoys through the dangerous Western Approaches. As an example, on 9 August 1917, Owl and two more destroyers of the 4th Flotilla rendezvoused with Convoy HS3, inbound from Sydney, Nova Scotia, reinforcing the escort of the convoy to St Helens.

At the end of the war, all pre-war destroyers were quickly withdrawn from active service, and Owl was sold for scrap on 5 November 1921.

== Pennant numbers ==
Pennant number	From	To
H31	1914	January 1918
H93	January 1918	-
