= HMS Christopher =

Destroyer of the Royal Navy

History

United Kingdom
- Name: HMS Christopher
- Builder: Hawthorn Leslie
- Laid down: 16 October 1911
- Launched: 28 August 1912
- Completed: November 1912
- Fate: Sold for scrap on 9 May 1921

General characteristics
- Class & type: Acasta-class destroyer
- Displacement: 938 tons
- Length: 267 ft 6 in (81.5 m)
- Beam: 27 ft 0 in (8.2 m)
- Draught: 10 ft 5 in (3.2 m)
- Propulsion: Yarrow-type water-tube boilers; Parsons steam turbines
- Speed: 29 knots (54 km/h)
- Armament: 3 × 4-inch (102 mm) guns; 2 × single tubes for 21-inch (533 mm) torpedoes

HMS Christopher was an Acasta-class destroyer (also known as the K class) of the British Royal Navy. She was built by Hawthorn Leslie in 1911–1912. She served throughout the First World War, forming part of the Grand Fleet until 1916 and taking part in the Battle of Jutland. Later in the war she served in the English Channel to protect merchant shipping against attacks by German U-boats. Christopher was sold for scrap in May 1921.

== Construction and design ==
Christopher was one of three Acasta-class destroyers ordered by the British Admiralty from the Hawthorn Leslie shipyard under the 1911–1912 shipbuilding programme, with a total of 20 Acastas (12, including Christopher to the standard Admiralty design and eight more as builder's specials).

The Acastas were larger and more powerful than the Acorn-class destroyers ordered under the previous year's programme. Greater speed was wanted to match large fast destroyers building for foreign navies, while a larger radius of action was desired. The destroyers built to the Admiralty standard design were 267 feet 6 inches (81.5 m) long overall and 260 feet 0 inches (79.2 m) between perpendiculars, with a beam of 27 feet 0 inches (8.2 m) and a draught of 10 feet 5 inches (3.2 m). Displacement was 892 long tons (906 t) Normal and 1,072 long tons (1,089 t) Deep load. (Note: Christopher was listed as having a displacement of 938 tons in 1919.)

Four Yarrow water-tube boilers fed steam to Parsons steam turbines which drove two propeller shafts. The machinery was rated to 24,500 shaft horsepower (18,300 kW) giving a design speed of 29 knots (54 km/h; 33 mph). (Note: While the nominal speed of the Acastas at 29 knots was the same as the Acorns, this speed was required at full load displacement rather than the lighter displacements previously used. A trial speed of 29.5 knots (54.6 km/h; 33.9 mph) at full load corresponded to a speed of 32 knots (59 km/h; 37 mph) at the lighter loads previously specified.) Three funnels were fitted. The ship had an endurance of 1,540 nautical miles (2,850 km; 1,770 mi) at 15 knots (28 km/h; 17 mph).

Armament consisted of three 4-inch (102 mm) guns mounted on the ship's centreline, with one forward and two aft, and two 21-inch (533 mm) torpedo tubes. Two reload torpedoes were carried. The ship had a crew of 73 officers and ratings. One of Christopher's 4-inch guns was modified in 1916 to a high-angle mounting for anti-aircraft fire. This gun, together with both torpedo tubes, were removed in April 1918 to accommodate depth charges and paravanes.

Christopher was laid down at Hawthorn Leslie's Hebburn shipyard on 16 October 1911, and was launched on 28 August 1912. In 1913 the Admiralty decided to reclassify the Royal Navy's destroyers into alphabetical classes, with the Acasta class becoming the K class. New names were allocated to the ships of the K class, with the name Kite being reserved for Christopher, but the ships were not renamed. (Note: It was considered unlucky to rename ships after they had been launched, which would also create considerable administrative problems. In addition, Winston Churchill, First Lord of the Admiralty noted that the names allocated to the Ks "are not good names".) Christopher reached a speed of 30.9 knots (57.2 km/h; 35.6 mph) during sea trials. She was completed in November 1912.

== Service ==
On commissioning, Christopher joined the 4th Destroyer Flotilla.

At the outbreak of the First World War, Christopher, along with the rest of the 4th Flotilla, joined the newly established Grand Fleet, based at Scapa Flow. In February 1915, Christopher was one of a number of Grand Fleet destroyers ordered to escort merchant ships carrying troops of the 1st Canadian Division from Avonmouth to St Nazaire. Although the destroyers failed to rendezvous with the convoy, it reached France without any losses On 13 February Owl, Hardy, Contest and Christopher were putting into Barrow harbour to refuel on the way back to Scotland, when they were suddenly signalled to turn away to avoid a ship leaving the harbour. Owl, Contest and Christopher ran aground while attempting to turn in the narrow approach channel, remaining aground until the next day. Christopher was repaired on the Clyde.

On 8 August 1915 Christopher was on patrol on the Moray Forth when the steamer Glenravel was attacked by the German submarine U-17. Christopher, responding to reports of the attack, reached the incident as Glenravel was sinking, and then spotted a submarine in the vicinity of another merchant ship, the Swedish Malmland. Christopher opened fire on the submarine, which dived away, but the destroyer could not stop Malmland being sunk by U-17. On 23 September Christopher collided with the armed boarding steamer King Orry, damaging the destroyer. On 3 January 1916 Christopher and Contest set out from Scapa to meet up with battleship Africa, on passage from Belfast, and escort her into Scapa. Poor weather forced the two destroyers to seek shelter at Stornoway, however, and Africa reached Scapa without escort.

Christopher was present at the Battle of Jutland on 31 May/1 June 1916. She was one of four destroyers (together with Shark, Acasta and Ophelia) assigned to escort the 3rd Battlecruiser Squadron. Although Shark was sunk and Acasta badly damaged in a clash with German light cruisers and torpedo boats, Christopher, which fired 30 shells in the battle, was undamaged, with none of her crew injured.

In July 1916, the 4th Flotilla left the Grand Fleet, moving to the Humber to counter German minelayers and to protect British minesweepers in the North Sea. The flotilla, including Christopher, moved again to Portsmouth in November that year. The 4th Flotilla was transferred to Devonport in spring 1917. Regular convoy operations on the North Atlantic route began in July 1917, with the destroyers of the 4th Flotilla being used as escorts to escort incoming convoys through the dangerous Western Approaches.

At the end of the war, all pre-war destroyers were quickly withdrawn from active service, and Christopher was sold for scrap on 9 May 1921.
