= HMS Fortune (1913) =

Acasta-class destroyer

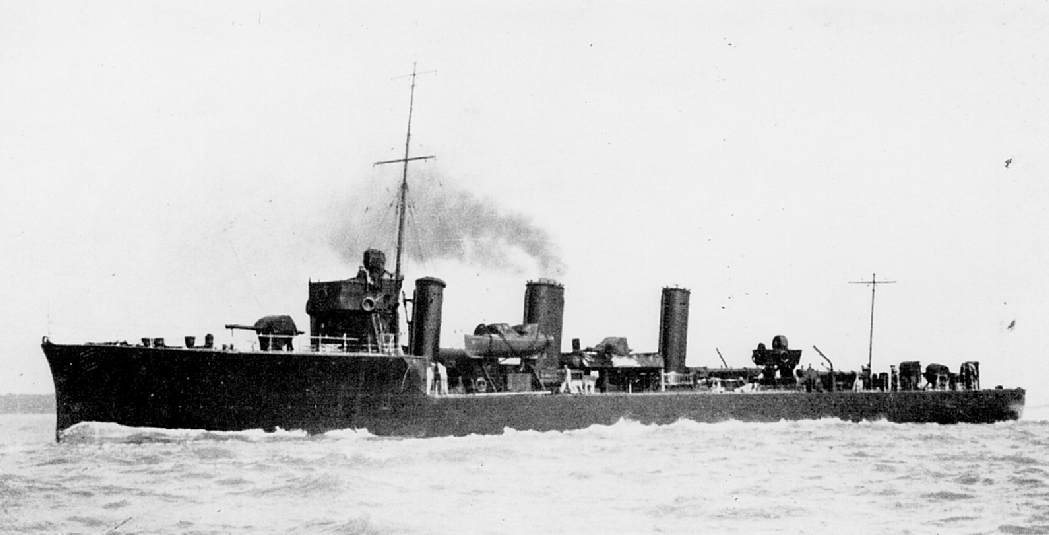
- HMS Fortune in pre-war black paint, and without pennant number

History

United Kingdom
- Name: HMS Fortune
- Builder: Fairfield Shipbuilding and Engineering Company, Govan
- Yard number: 488
- Launched: 17 March 1913
- Fate: Sunk by SMS Westfalen at Battle of Jutland on 1 June 1916

General characteristics
- Class & type: Acasta-class destroyer
- Displacement: 1,072 long tons (1,089 t)
- Length: 267 ft 6 in (81.53 m)
- Beam: 27 ft (8.2 m)
- Draught: 9 ft 6 in (2.90 m)
- Installed power: 4 × Yarrow-type water-tube boilers; 24,500 ihp (18,300 kW)
- Propulsion: Parsons steam turbines; 2 shafts
- Speed: 29 kn (54 km/h; 33 mph)
- Complement: 73
- Armament: 3 × QF 4-inch (101.6 mm) L/40 Mark IV guns, mounting P Mk. IX; 2 × single tubes for 21 inch (533 mm) torpedoes

HMS Fortune was an Acasta-class destroyer, and the twenty-first ship of the Royal Navy to bear the name. She was launched in 1913 and was sunk at the Battle of Jutland in 1916.

== Design and description ==
The Acastas were larger and heavier armed than the preceding H and I classes (Acorn and Acheron, respectively), displacing about 25% more and with the mixed calibre armament replaced with a uniform fit of QF 4-inch guns, which the Acastas introduced. Previous 4-inch (102 mm) weapons had been of the breech-loading (BL) type. The guns were shipped one each on the forecastle and either side abreast the after torpedo tube (or amidships before and after the tube in some ships.) All ships had three funnels, the foremost being tall and narrow, the second short and wide and the third level with the second but narrower. The foremost torpedo tube was sited between the second and third funnels, a distinctive feature of this class.

There were twelve 'standard' vessels built to a common Admiralty design, and eight builders' specials that (except for Garland) had a shorter, less beamy hull; five of the latter were from Thornycroft with 22,500 shp (16,800 kW) (one of Thornycroft's ships, Hardy, was planned to diesel cruising motors, but these were not ready in time and Hardy was completed with Thornycroft's standard machinery). One by Parsons (Garland) had semi-geared turbines giving a speed of 31 knots (57 km/h; 36 mph) on trials, with a seventh from Fairfields had a clipper bow. The eighth 'special' was Ardent by William Denny, Dumbarton, which was built using longitudinal framing rather than conventional transverse framing. While Ardent's novel construction seems to have been a success, no more destroyers were built for the Royal Navy using longitudinal framing until the J-class destroyers in the 1930s.

Fortune displaced 1,072 long tons (1,089 t) with a length of 267 feet 6 inches (81.53 m), a beam of 27 feet (8.2 m) and a draught of 9 feet 6 inches (2.90 m). The destroyer had a complement of 73.

The ship was powered by four Yarrow-type water-tube boilers which fed Parsons steam turbines rated at 24,500 shaft horsepower (18,300 kW), which drove two shafts, giving the destroyer a maximum speed of 29 knots (54 km/h; 33 mph). Fortune was given an experimental clipper bow

Fortune was armed with three QF 4-inch (101.6 mm) L/40 Mark IV guns on P Mk. IX mountings. However, Fortune was a "Builders' Special", and the second 4-inch gun was mounted on a platform between the no.2 and 3 funnels. The destroyer was also equipped with two single torpedo tubes for four 21 inch (533 mm) torpedoes.

== Construction and career ==
Fortune was laid down under the 1911–1912 construction programme by Fairfield Shipbuilding and Engineering Company and launched on 17 March 1913. She was temporarily renamed HMS Kismet in October 1913, but this was reverted shortly afterwards.

She joined the 4th Destroyer Flotilla on completion and served with the Grand Fleet on the outbreak of World War I.

=== Battle of Jutland and loss ===
During the evening of 31 May 1916, the 4th Flotilla was screening the rear of the Grand Fleet in the Battle of Jutland, against the Imperial German Navy's High Seas Fleet. At 11:20 pm, the 4th Flotilla encountered unknown ships off their starboard quarter. Believing them to be British, the flotilla leader Tipperary flashed a challenge. Six opposing ships, comprising the battleships Westfalen, Nassau and Rheinland and three cruisers, turned on their floodlights and opened up with their secondary armament. Most aimed for Tipperary which was soon ablaze. The destroyers began to return fire and launched a torpedo attack, which led to a collision among the Germans.

During this first attack, Fortune and Ardent were separated from the rest of the flotilla. They began to look for the German ships which had disengaged after battering their way through the 4th Flotilla. About 11:30 pm they eventually found four large ships and engaged them. Both Ardent and Fortune were sunk in the ensuing firefight. The last anyone saw of Fortune was the ship afire but still firing as the destroyer was sinking. Seven survivors became POWs while a further eleven (2 wounded) were picked up by British ships, and the other 67 crewmen were killed or missing.

The wrecksite is designated as a protected place, under the Protection of Military Remains Act 1986.

== Pennant numbers ==
Pennant Number	From	To
H30	6 December 1914	31 May 1916
