= Acasta-class destroyer =

Class of British destroyers

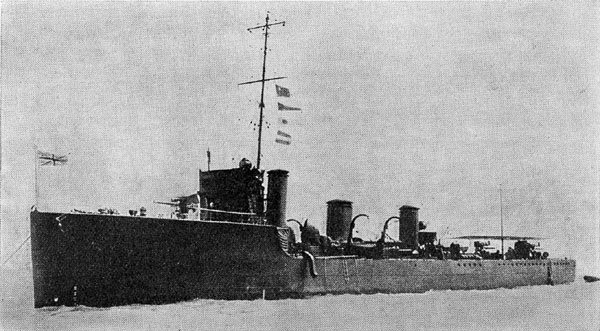
- HMS Shark, lost at the Battle of Jutland

Class overview
- Name: Acasta class
- Operators: Royal Navy; Brazilian Navy
- Preceded by: Acheron class
- Succeeded by: L class
- Built: 1912–1913
- In commission: 1912–1923
- Completed: 20
- Lost: 7

General characteristics
- Type: Torpedo boat destroyer
- Displacement: 934 to 984 tons
- Length: 267 ft 6 in (81.53 m) to 252 ft (76.8 m)
- Beam: 26 ft 6 in (8.08 m) to 26 ft 9 in (8.15 m)
- Draught: 9 ft 6 in (2.90 m) to 9 ft (2.7 m)
- Installed power: 24,500 hp (18,270 kW)
- Propulsion: Standard K class: 2-shaft Parsons steam turbines; Yarrow-type oil-fired boilers; Acasta, Achates, Ambuscade: 2 shaft Brown-Curtis steam turbines; Yarrow-type oil-fired boilers
- Speed: 29 kn (53.7 km/h) - 32 kn (59.3 km/h)
- Complement: 75 - 77
- Armament: Three QF 4-inch (101.6 mm) L/40 Mark IV guns, mounting P Mk. IX (last 7 ships) else P Mk VII; One QF 2-pounder pom-pom Mk. II; 2 × single tubes for 21 inch (533 mm) torpedoes

The Acasta class (in September 1913 re-designated the K class) was a class of twenty destroyers built for the Royal Navy under the Naval Programme of 1911 - 1912 that saw service during World War I. They were the last class of Royal Navy destroyers to have mixed names with no systematic theme (see naming conventions for destroyers of the Royal Navy for more information.) When the class was designated as "K", names beginning with that letter were allocated to the ships but never used. (Note: No class of ships were designated as J class.) The class saw extensive wartime service and seven were lost, including four at the Battle of Jutland.

== Design ==
The Acastas were larger and heavier armed than the preceding H and I classes (Acorn and Acheron, respectively), displacing about 25% more and with the mixed calibre armament replaced with a uniform fit of QF 4-inch guns, which the Acastas introduced. Previous 4-inch (102 mm) weapons had been of the breech-loading (BL) type. The 4-in guns were shipped one on the forecastle and one at the stern, as in the Acheron class, while the third was variously sited on the centreline between the two torpedo tubes or abaft both. All ships had three funnels, the foremost being tall and narrow, the second short and wide and the third level with the second but narrower. The foremost torpedo tube was sited between the second and third funnels, a distinctive feature of this class.

There were twelve 'standard' vessels built to a common Admiralty design, and eight builders' specials that (except for Garland) had a shorter, less beamy hull; five of the latter were from Thornycroft with 22,500 shp (16,800 kW) (one of Thornycroft's ships, Hardy, was planned to diesel cruising motors, but these were not ready in time and Hardy was completed with Thornycroft's standard machinery). One by Parsons (Garland) had semi-geared turbines giving a speed of 31 knots (57 km/h; 36 mph) on trials, with a seventh from Fairfields had a clipper bow. The eighth 'special' was Ardent by William Denny, Dumbarton, which was built using longitudinal framing rather than conventional transverse framing. While Ardent's novel construction seems to have been a success, no more destroyers were built for the Royal Navy using longitudinal framing until the J-class destroyers in the 1930s.

== Service ==
At the outbreak of World War I until mid-1916, the Acastas were serving in the Grand Fleet as the 4th Destroyer Flotilla, with Swift as leader. By the time of the Battle of Jutland the leader was the Faulknor-class flotilla leader Tipperary, with Ardent, Fortune, Shark and Sparrowhawk lost in the course of the battle and Acasta was so badly damaged that she had to be practically rebuilt. After Jutland the remainder of the flotilla moved to the Humber and then to Portsmouth by the end of 1916, before dispersing, some ships to the 6th Destroyer Flotilla and the Dover Patrol and the remainder to Devonport. All survivors of the war were sold out of service for scrapping by 1921.

== Ships ==
=== Admiralty K class ===
Name	Ship Builder	Laid down	Launched	Completed	Fate
Acasta	John Brown & Co., Clydebank	1 December 1911	10 September 1912	November 1912	Sold for breaking up 9 May 1921.
Achates	John Brown	15 January 1912	14 November 1912	March 1913	Sold for breaking up 9 May 1921.
Ambuscade	John Brown	7 March 1912	25 January 1913	June 1913	Sold for breaking up 6 September 1921.
Christopher	Hawthorn Leslie & Co., Newcastle	16 October 1911	29 August 1912	November 1912	Sold for breaking up 9 May 1921.
Cockatrice	Hawthorn Leslie	23 October 1911	8 November 1912	March 1913	Sold for breaking up 9 May 1921.
Contest	Hawthorn Leslie	26 December 1911	7 January 1913	June 1913	Torpedoed and sunk by German U-boat in the Western Approaches 18 September 1917.
Lynx	Harland & Wolff, Govan	18 January 1912	20 March 1913	January 1914	Mined and sunk in Moray Firth by mine laid from German raider Meteor 9 August 1915.
Midge	Harland & Wolff, Govan	1 April 1912	22 May 1913	March 1913	Sold for breaking up 5 November 1921.
Owl	Harland & Wolff, Govan	1 April 1913	7 May 1913	April 1914	Sold for breaking up 5 November 1921.
Shark	Swan, Hunter & Wigham Richardson, Wallsend	18 October 1911	30 July 1912	3 April 1913	Disabled by gunfire and torpedoed and sunk at Battle of Jutland 31 May 1916.
Sparrowhawk	Swan, Hunter	25 October 1911	12 October 1912	2 May 1913	Collided with HMS Broke at Battle of Jutland and torpedoed by HMS Marksman 1 June 1916.
Spitfire	Swan, Hunter	20 December 1911	23 December 1912	19 June 1913	Sold for breaking up 9 May 1921.

=== K-class Builders' specials ===
Name	Ship Builder	Laid down	Launched	Completed	Fate
Ardent	William Denny & Br., Dumbarton	9 October 1912	8 September 1913	February 1914	Sunk by secondary gunfire from German dreadnought SMS Westfalen at Battle of Jutland 1 June 1916.
Fortune	Fairfield, Govan	24 June 1912	17 May 1913	December 1913	Sunk by secondary gunfire from German dreadnought SMS Westfalen at Battle of Jutland on night of 31 May / 1 June 1916.
Garland	Parsons Turbine, Wallsend (hull sub-contracted to Cammell Laird, Birkenhead)	15 July 1912	23 April 1913	December 1913	Sold for breaking up 6 September 1921.
Hardy	Thornycroft, Woolston	13 November 1911	10 October 1913	September 1913	Sold for breaking up 9 May 1921.
Paragon	Thornycroft	14 March 1912	21 February 1913	December 1913	Torpedoed and sunk by German destroyer in action in the Straits of Dover 18 March 1917.
Porpoise	Thornycroft	14 March 1912	21 July 1913	January 1914	Sold 23 February 1920 back to Thornycroft for resale to Brazil; became Brazilian Alexandrino Deaenca, later Maranhao.
Unity	Thornycroft	1 April 1912	18 September 1913	March 1914	Sold for breaking up 25 October 1922.
Victor	Thornycroft	1 April 1912	28 November 1913	June 1914	Sold for breaking up 20 January 1923.

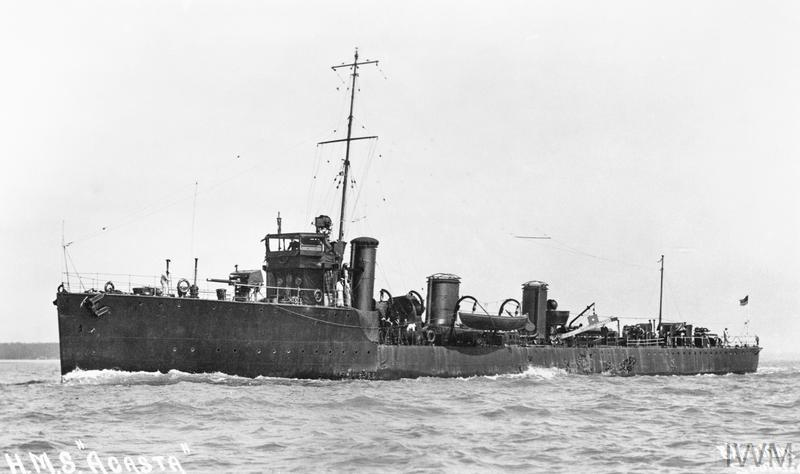
HMS Acasta

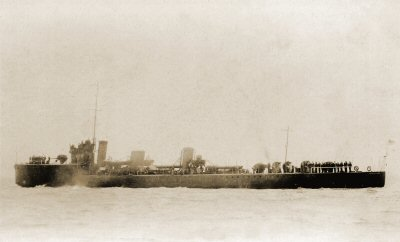
HMS Ambuscade

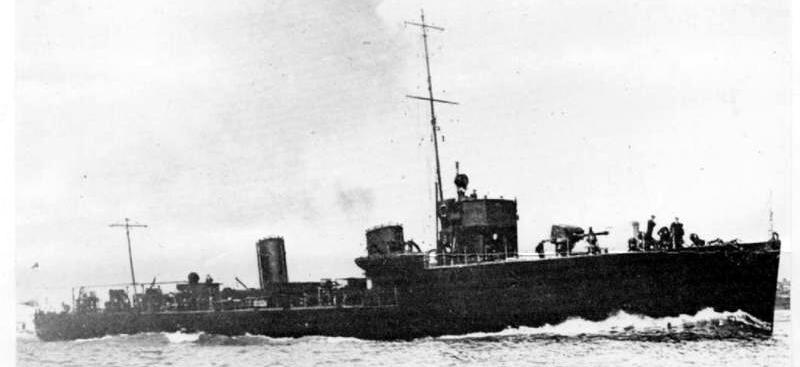
HMS Ardent

HMS Contest

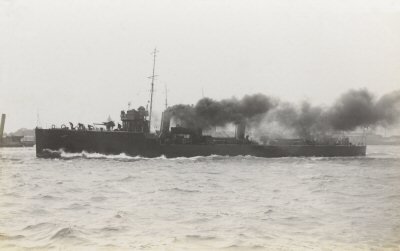
HMS Hardy at speed

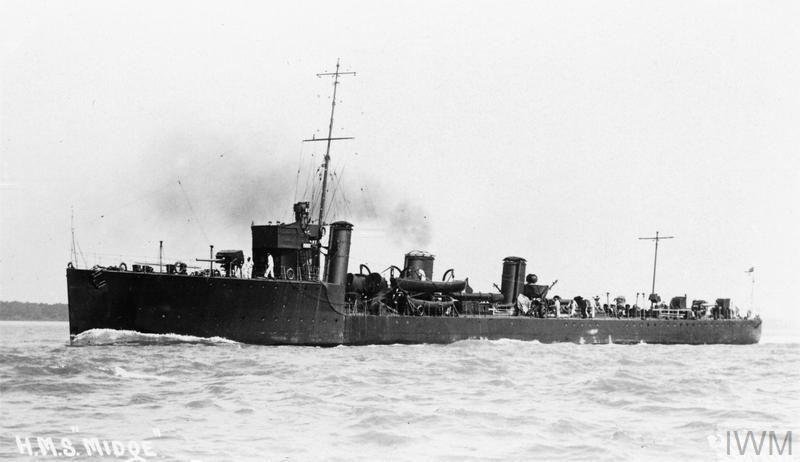
HMS Midge

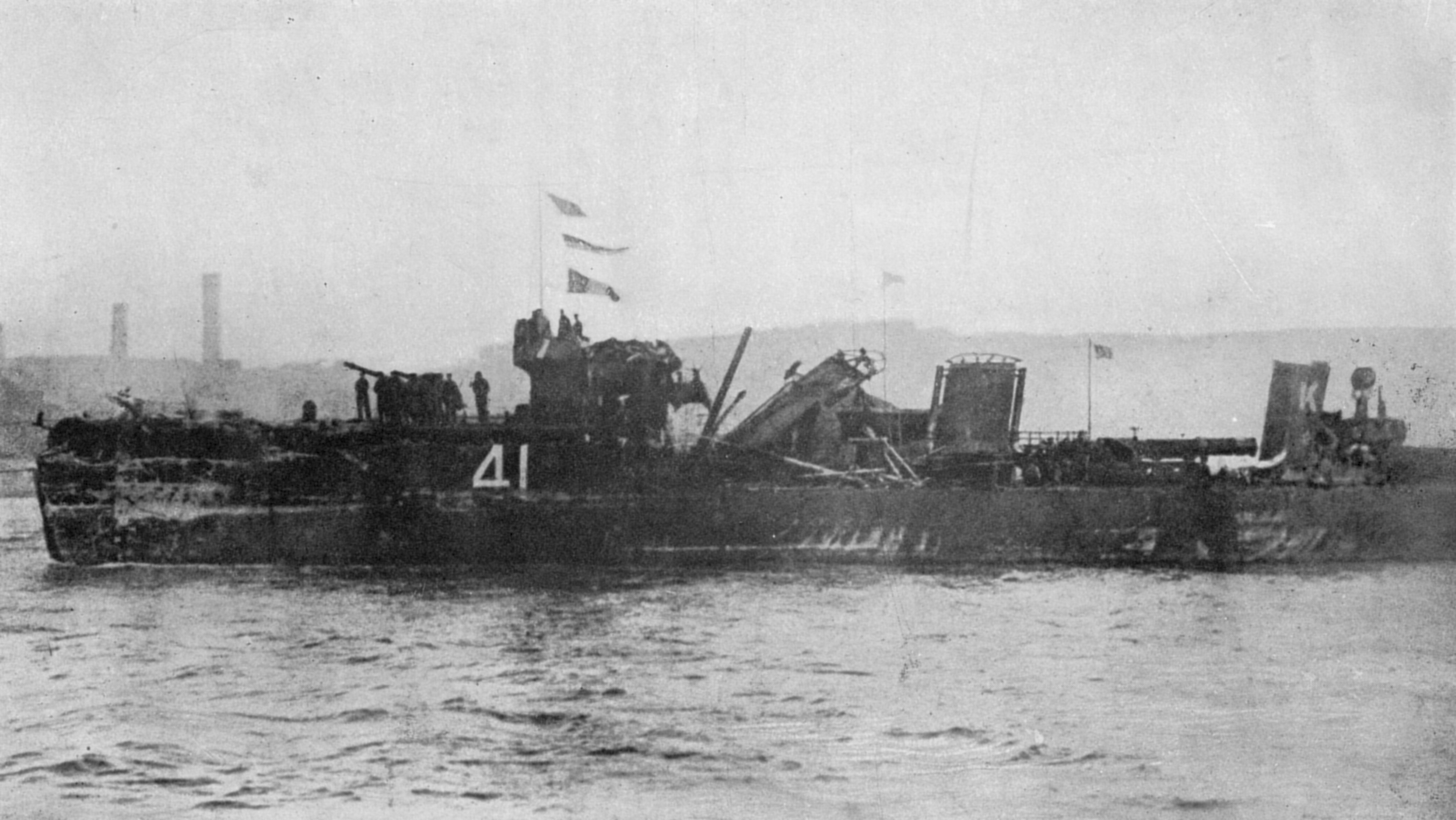
HMS Spitfire showing damage sustained at Jutland

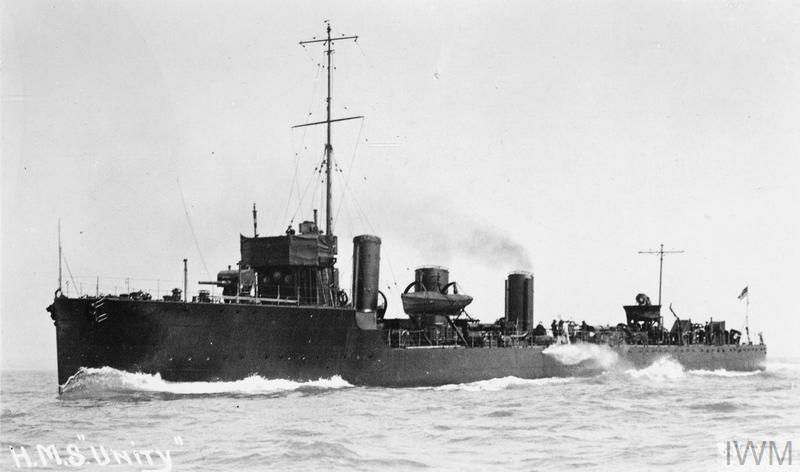
HMS Unity

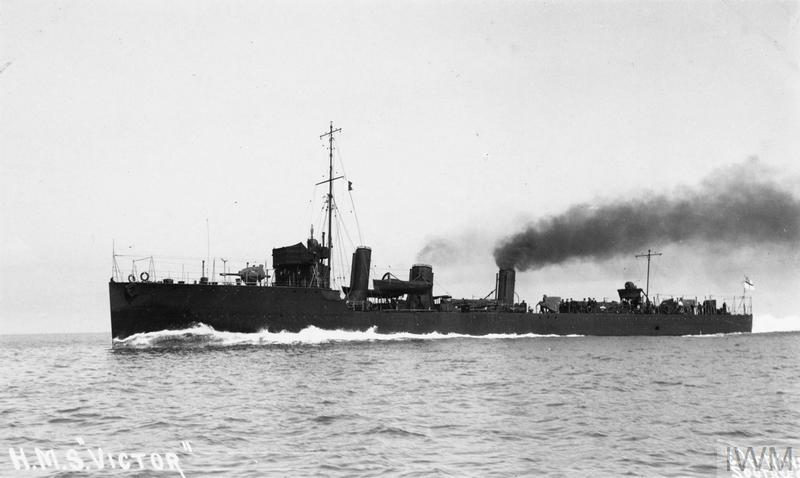
Victor

== Bibliography ==
- Brown, David K. (1999). The Grand Fleet: Warship Design and Development 1906–1922. Naval Institute Press. ISBN 1-55750-315-X.
- Maurice Cocker, Destroyers of the Royal Navy, 1893-1981, 1983, Ian Allan ISBN 0-7110-1075-7
- Friedman, Norman (2009). British Destroyers From Earliest Days to the Second World War. Naval Institute Press. ISBN 978-1-59114-081-8.
