= HMS Ardent (1913) =

Acasta-class destroyer

Coordinates: 56°42′N 5°52′E

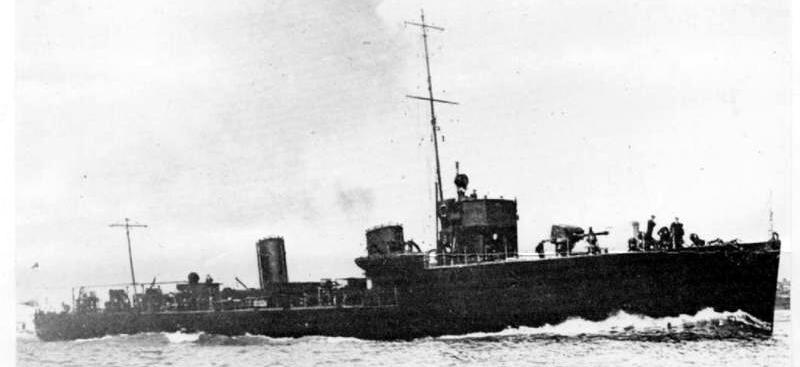
- Ardent

History

United Kingdom
- Name: Ardent
- Builder: William Denny & Brothers, Dumbarton
- Laid down: 9 October 1912
- Launched: 8 September 1913
- Commissioned: February 1914
- Fate: Sunk at Battle of Jutland, 1 June 1916

General characteristics (as built)
- Class & type: Acasta-class destroyer
- Displacement: 1,072 long tons (1,089 t) (deep load)
- Length: 267 ft 6 in (81.5 m)
- Beam: 27 ft (8.2 m)
- Draught: 9 ft 6 in (2.9 m)
- Installed power: 3 Yarrow boilers; 24,500 shp (18,300 kW)
- Propulsion: 2 shafts; 1 steam turbine
- Speed: 29 knots (54 km/h; 33 mph)
- Range: 1,540 nmi (2,850 km; 1,770 mi) at 15 knots (28 km/h; 17 mph)
- Complement: 73
- Armament: 3 × single 4 in (102 mm) guns; 2 × single 21 in (533 mm) torpedo tubes

HMS Ardent was one of 20 Acasta-class destroyers built for the Royal Navy in the 1910s. Completed in 1914 she saw active service in the First World War, and was sunk at the Battle of Jutland in 1916.

== Design and description ==
The Acasta class was based on an enlarged HMS Firedrake, a very fast Yarrow Special of the Acheron class. Ardent was ordered to evaluate William Denny & Brothers' recently developed longitudinal framing method of building which offered greater hull strength for a given weight than conventional transverse construction. The Acastas had an overall length of 267 feet 6 inches (82 m), a beam of 27 feet (8.2 m), and a normal draught of 9 feet 6 inches (2.9 m). The ships displaced 1,072 long tons (1,089 t) at deep load and their crew numbered 73 officers and ratings.

The destroyers were powered by a single Parsons steam turbine that drove two propeller shafts using steam provided by Yarrow boilers. Ardent differed from her sister ships in that she had only three rather than four boilers and only two funnels. The engines developed a total of 24,500 shaft horsepower (18,300 kW) and were designed for a speed of 29 knots (54 km/h; 33 mph). The ship reached a speed of 29.5 knots (54.6 km/h; 33.9 mph) during her sea trials. The Acastas had a range of 1,540 nautical miles (2,850 km; 1,770 mi) at a cruising speed of 15 knots (28 km/h; 17 mph).

The primary armament of the ships consisted of three BL 4-inch (102 mm) Mk VIII guns (Note: Ardent may have been equipped with QF 4-inch naval gun Mk IV, XII, XXII) in single, unprotected pivot mounts. Ardent had one gun on the forecastle, one on a platform between her funnels and the third aft of the superstructure. The destroyers were equipped with a pair of single rotating mounts for 21-inch (533 mm) torpedo tubes amidships and carried two reload torpedoes.

== Construction and career ==
HMS Ardent, the seventh Royal Navy ship to bear the name, was ordered under the 1911–1912 Naval Programme from William Denny & Brothers. The ship was laid down at the company's Dumbarton shipyard on 9 October 1911, launched on 8 September 1912 and commissioned in February 1914. She joined the 4th Destroyer Flotilla on completion, and served with the Grand Fleet on the outbreak of the First World War.

She was sunk on 1 June 1916 during the Battle of Jutland by secondary fire from the German dreadnought SMS Westfalen. Seventy-eight men went down with the ship; there were only two survivors–commanding officer Arthur Marsden and a rating.

The wrecksite is designated as a protected place under the Protection of Military Remains Act 1986.

== Pennant numbers ==
Pennant number	From	To
H78	6 December 1914	1 June 1916

== Bibliography ==
- Colledge, J. J.; Warlow, Ben (2006) [1969]. Ships of the Royal Navy: The Complete Record of All Fighting Ships of the Royal Navy from the 15th Century to the Present (3rd Rev ed.). London: Chatham Publishing. ISBN 978-1-86176-281-8. OCLC 67375475.
- Friedman, Norman (2009). British Destroyers: From Earliest Days to the Second World War. Barnsley, UK: Seaforth Publishing. ISBN 978-1-84832-049-9.
- Gardiner, Robert & Gray, Randal, eds. (1985). Conway's All The World's Fighting Ships 1906–1921. London: Conway Maritime Press. ISBN 0-85177-245-5.
- March, Edgar J. (1966). British Destroyers: A History of Development, 1892–1953; Drawn by Admiralty Permission From Official Records & Returns, Ships' Covers & Building Plans. London: Seeley Service. OCLC 164893555.
