= HMS Sparrowhawk (1912) =

Acasta-class destroyer

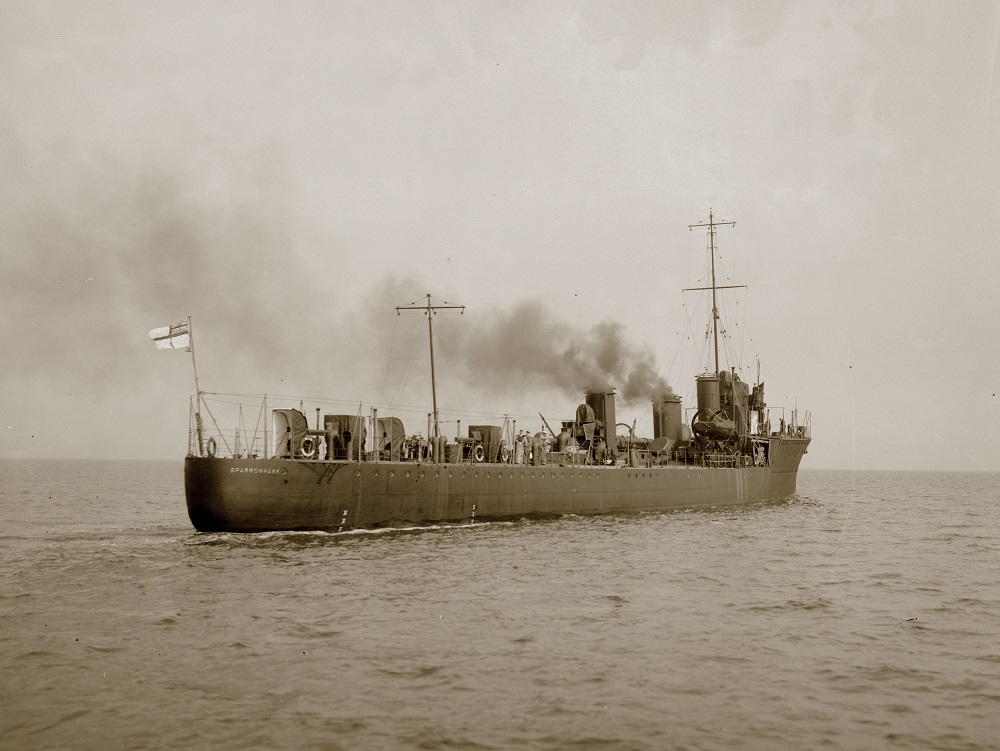
- HMS Sparrowhawk

History

United Kingdom
- Name: HMS Sparrowhawk
- Builder: Swan, Hunter & Wigham Richardson, Wallsend
- Laid down: 25 October 1911
- Launched: 12 October 1912
- Commissioned: 2 May 1913
- Fate: After collision on 30 May and attempted tow failed, 1 June 1916 abandoned and scuttled

General characteristics
- Class & type: Acasta-class destroyer
- Displacement: 937
- Length: 267 ft 6 in (81.5 m)
- Beam: 27 ft 0 in (8.2 m)
- Draught: 10 ft 6 in (3.2 m)
- Propulsion: Yarrow-type water-tube boilers; Parsons steam turbines
- Speed: 29 knots (54 km/h; 33 mph)
- Armament: 3 × QF 4 in (102 mm) L/40 Mark IV guns, mounting P Mk. IX; 2 × single tubes for 21 in (533 mm) torpedoes

HMS Sparrowhawk was an Acasta-class destroyer built in 1912 and sunk in 1916 at the Battle of Jutland after a collision with the destroyer leader HMS Broke.

== Construction and career ==
Sparrowhawk was one of three Acasta-class destroyers built at the Wallsend yard of Swan, Hunter & Wigham Richardson and launched on 12 October 1912. She joined the Royal Navy as part of the 4th Destroyer Flotilla upon completion in mid-1913.

=== Service in World War I ===
From the outbreak of World War I Sparrowhawk served with the 4th Destroyer Flotilla as part of the Grand Fleet.

=== Loss at the Battle of Jutland ===
She was sunk on 1 June 1916 after a collision with HMS Broke at the Battle of Jutland. Six of her crew were killed.

At around 23.40 some of the ships of the 4th Destroyer Flotilla formed up under Commander Walter Allen of Broke, who was the half-flotilla leader, with the aim of continuing the attack against German ships nearby. Broke was caught in searchlights coming from the German battleship SMS Westfalen. She attempted to fire torpedoes, but the range was very short, in the region of 150 yards (140 m), and the German ship opened fire first. The effect was devastating so that within a couple of minutes 50 crew were killed and another 30 injured, disabling the guns and preventing any effective activity on deck. The helmsman was killed at the wheel, and as he died his body turned the wheel causing the ship to turn to port and ram Sparrowhawk.

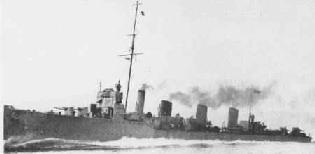
HMS Broke, the destroyer leader that collided with Sparrowhawk at Jutland

Sub-Lieutenant Percy Wood saw Broke coming towards them at 28 knots (52 km/h; 32 mph), heading directly for Sparrowhawk's bridge. He shouted warnings to crew on the fo'c'sle to get clear, and then was knocked over by the impact. He awoke to find himself lying on the deck of Broke. Wood reported to Commander Allen, who told him to return to his own ship and make preparations there to take on board the crew of Broke. Two other men from Sparrowhawk were also thrown onto Broke by the collision. Returning to Sparrowhawk, Wood was told by his own captain, Lieutenant-Commander Sydney Hopkins, that he had just sent exactly the same message across to Broke. Approximately 20 men from Sparrowhawk evacuated to Broke, while fifteen of Broke's crew crossed to Sparrowhawk.

At this point a third destroyer, HMS Contest steamed into Sparrowhawk, striking 6 feet (1.8 m) from her stern. Contest was relatively unharmed and able to continue after the collision. Broke and Sparrowhawk remained wedged together for about half an hour before they could be separated and Broke got underway, taking 30 of Sparrowhawk's crew with her.

Sparrowhawk still had engine power but the rudder was jammed to one side so she could do nothing except steam in circles, near the burning destroyer Tipperary. At around 0200 a German torpedo boat approached, coming within 100 yards (91 m), but then turned away. Only one gun was still functional, which the captain and his officers manned personally as the gun crews had been killed or injured, but they held fire in the hope the German would not initiate an attack Sparrowhawk could not hope to survive. Shortly after, Tipperary sank, putting out the fire which was attracting attention to the area. At around 0330 Sparrowhawk sighted a German cruiser, again causing considerable alarm, but shortly afterwards the ship was seen to list and then sink bow first. This was SMS Elbing, which had been torpedoed and then abandoned. At 0610 a raft approached, carrying 23 men from Tipperary: three were found to be already dead, while five more died after being taken on board.

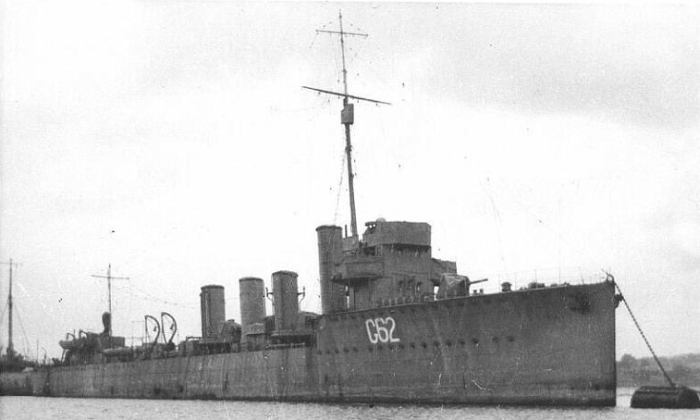
HMS Marksman, the destroyer leader that finally had to sink Sparrowhawk

An hour later three British destroyers arrived and HMS Marksman attempted to get two hawsers attached to Sparrowhawk to tow her to safety. The high seas meant the ropes parted and there were reports of German submarines nearby. It was decided that Sparrowhawk must be abandoned, and Marksman fired 18 shells into her to ensure that she sank.

The wreck of HMS Sparrowhawk was located in August 2016 by Dr Innes McCartney of Bournemouth University and a team from the Sea War Museum Jutland. The wreck has been commercially salvaged at some time in the past. The wrecksite is designated as a protected place under the Protection of Military Remains Act 1986.

== Pennant numbers ==
Pennant Number	From	To
H61	6 December 1914	1 June 1916
