= SMS Elbing =

Light cruiser of the German Imperial Navy

- Elbing's sister ship Pillau, c. 1914–16

History

German Empire
- Name: Elbing
- Namesake: City of Elbing
- Builder: Schichau-Werke, Danzig
- Laid down: 21 May 1913
- Launched: 21 November 1914
- Commissioned: 4 September 1915
- Fate: Scuttled at the Battle of Jutland on 1 June 1916

General characteristics
- Class & type: Pillau-class cruiser
- Displacement: Normal: 4,390 t (4,320 long tons; 4,840 short tons); Full load: 5,252 t (5,169 long tons; 5,789 short tons)
- Length: 135.3 m (444 ft)
- Beam: 13.6 m (45 ft)
- Draft: 5.98 m (19.6 ft)
- Installed power: 10 × water-tube boilers; 30,000 shp (22,400 kW)
- Propulsion: 2 × steam turbines; 2 × screw propellers
- Speed: 27.5 knots (50.9 km/h)
- Range: 4,300 nmi (8,000 km; 4,900 mi) at 12 kn (22 km/h; 14 mph)
- Complement: 21 officers; 421 enlisted men
- Armament: 8 × 15 cm (5.9 in) SK L/45 guns; 2 × 8.8 cm (3.5 in) SK L/45 guns; 2 × 50 cm (19.7 in) torpedo tubes; 120 mines
- Armor: Deck 80 mm (3.1 in); Conning tower: 75 mm (3 in)

SMS Elbing was a light cruiser ordered by the Imperial Russian navy under the name Admiral Nevelskoy from the Schichau-Werke shipyard in Danzig in 1913. Following the outbreak of World War I, the ship was confiscated in August 1914 and launched on 21 November 1914 as SMS Elbing. She had one sister ship, Pillau, the lead ship of their class. The ship was commissioned into the High Seas Fleet in September 1915. She was armed with a main battery of eight 15 cm SK L/45 guns and had a top speed of 27.5 kn (50.9 km/h; 31.6 mph).

Elbing participated in only two major operations during her career. The first, the bombardment of Yarmouth and Lowestoft, occurred in April 1916; there, she briefly engaged the British Harwich Force. A month later, she took part in the Battle of Jutland, where she scored the first hit of the engagement. She was heavily engaged in the confused fighting on the night of 31 May – 1 June, and shortly after midnight she was accidentally rammed by the battleship Posen, which tore a hole in the ship's hull. Flooding disabled the ship's engines and electrical generators, rendering her immobilized and without power. At around 02:00, a German torpedo boat took off most of her crew, and an hour later the remaining men scuttled the ship; they escaped in the ship's cutter and were later picked up by a Dutch steamer.

== Design ==
In 1912, the Imperial Russian Navy held a design competition for a new class of cruisers intended for service in their colonial empire, which were to replace the ageing Askold and Zhemchug in East Asian waters. Several foreign firms, including the German company Schichau-Werke, submitted proposals for the vessels. The Russian fleet was in dire need of new cruisers, and only Schichau promised to meet an early delivery deadline, so they received the contracts for two ships in December 1912. These were to have been named Maraviev Amurskyy and Admiral Nevelskoy; the outbreak of World War I in July 1914 led to their seizure by the German government, and they became Pillau and Elbing, respectively.

Elbing was 135.3 meters (444 ft) long overall and had a beam of 13.6 m (45 ft) and a draft of 5.98 m (19.6 ft) forward. She displaced 4,390 t (4,320 long tons) normally and up to 5,252 t (5,169 long tons) at full load. The ship had a straight stem and a raised forecastle deck. Her superstructure included a conning tower just aft of the forecastle and a second deck house further aft. She was fitted with two pole masts equipped with spotting platforms. Elbing had a standard crew of twenty-one officers and 421 enlisted men, though this was expanded in wartime.

Her propulsion system consisted of two sets of Marine steam turbines driving two 3.5-meter (11 ft) propellers. Steam was provided by six coal-fired Yarrow water-tube boilers and four oil-fired Yarrow boilers, which were vented through three funnels located amidships. The propulsion system was rated to produce 30,000 shaft horsepower (22,000 kW) for a top speed of 27.5 knots (50.9 km/h; 31.6 mph) Elbing carried 620 t (610 long tons) of coal, and an additional 580 t (570 long tons) of oil that gave her a range of approximately 4,300 nautical miles (8,000 km; 4,900 mi) at 12 knots (22 km/h; 14 mph).

The ship was armed with eight 15 cm (5.9 in) SK L/45 guns in single pedestal mounts. Two were placed side by side forward on the forecastle, four were located amidships, two on either side, and two were side by side aft. She also carried four 5.2 cm (2 in) SK L/55 anti-aircraft guns, though these were replaced with a pair of two 8.8 cm (3.5 in) SK L/45 anti-aircraft guns. She was also equipped with a pair of 50 cm (19.7 in) torpedo tubes mounted on the deck. She could also carry 120 mines. The conning tower had 75 mm (3 in) thick sides, and the deck was covered with up to 80 mm (3.1 in) thick armor plate.

== Service history ==
Elbing was ordered by the Imperial Russian Navy as Admiral Nevelskoy from the Schichau-Werke shipyard in Danzig. She was laid down on 21 May 1913, requisitioned by the German Navy on 5 August 1914, and was renamed Elbing. She was launched on 21 November 1914, after which fitting-out work commenced. She was commissioned to begin sea trials on 4 September 1915, initially under the command of Kapitän zur See (Captain at Sea) Friedrich Richter, though in February he was replaced by Fregattenkapitän (Frigate Captain) Madlung. Elbing was accidentally rammed by a torpedo boat on 4 November, while still completing her initial training, and her stern was damaged in the incident. She was pronounced ready for active service on 16 November.

The ship was initially assigned to the Baltic Sea at the urging of Prince Heinrich, the commander of naval forces in the Baltic. New Russian warships expected to enter service in the near future required a modern, powerful light cruiser to combat them. Elbing was assigned to Konteradmiral (KAdm—Rear Admiral) Albert Hopman, the Führer der Aufklärungschiffe der Ostsee (Leader of Scouting Ships in the Baltic Sea), and she joined the unit he commanded in Libau on 18 November. On 5 December, she went to sea in company with the cruiser Augsburg, several torpedo boats, and the minelayer Rügen to lay a minefield off Lyserort to block the Irbe Strait, the eastern exit from the Gulf of Riga.

In early 1916, Vizeadmiral (Vice Admiral) Reinhard Scheer (the commander of the High Seas Fleet) requested that Elbing be transferred to his command in the North Sea to strengthen his scouting forces. The Admiralstab (Admiralty Staff) initially rejected his request, citing the recent sinkings of the cruisers Lübeck and München on 13 January and 1 February, respectively, which had reduced the strength of the scouting forces in the Baltic. While the issue was still being debated, Elbing temporarily served as the flagship of VI Scouting Group under Kommodore (Commodore) Hugo Langemak from 2 to 29 February. In that time, it was agreed that Elbing would be sent to the North Sea in exchange for the cruiser Strassburg. Elbing was sent to Danzig for an overhaul that lasted from 3 to 26 March.

On 28 March, Elbing was assigned to II Scouting Group, which typically conducted local, defensive patrols in the German Bight. On 2 April, Elbing and the rest of II Scouting Group sortied along with the battlecruisers Von der Tann and Lützow of I Scouting Group and the dreadnought battleships of III Battle Squadron. The ships sailed out to the Amrun Bank to provide distant cover to several flotillas of torpedo boats that were sent to raid British coastal waters. From 5 to 13 April, Madlung was temporarily given the position as Commander of Torpedo Boats. Elbing next went to sea on 21 April for a sweep in company with I and II Scouting Groups and their escorting torpedo boats to the west of Amrun Bank. The operation failed to locate any British warships, and the Germans returned to port the following day.

Her next major operation was the bombardment of Yarmouth and Lowestoft on 24–25 April. On the approach to Lowestoft, Elbing and Rostock spotted the Harwich Force, a squadron of three light cruisers and eighteen destroyers, approaching the German formation from the south at 04:50. KAdm Friedrich Boedicker, the German commander, initially ordered his battlecruisers to continue with the bombardment, while Elbing and the other five light cruisers concentrated to engage the Harwich Force. At around 05:30, the British and German light forces clashed, firing mostly at long range. The battlecruisers arrived on the scene at 05:47, prompting the British squadron to retreat at high speed. A light cruiser and destroyer were damaged before Boedicker broke off the engagement after receiving reports of submarines in the area. Elbing arrived undamaged in Wilhelmshaven on 25 April.

=== Battle of Jutland ===
Maps showing the maneuvers of the British (blue) and German (red) fleets on 30–31 May 1916

In May 1916, Scheer planned to lure a portion of the British fleet away from its bases and destroy it with the entire High Seas Fleet. Elbing remained in II Scouting Group, attached to I Scouting Group, for the operation. The squadron left the Jade roadstead at 02:00 on 31 May, bound for the waters of the Skagerrak. The main body of the fleet followed an hour and a half later. At 15:00, lookouts on Elbing spotted the Danish steamer N. J. Fjord; Elbing detached the torpedo boats B109 and B110 to investigate the steamer. Two British cruisers, HMS Galatea and Phaeton, were simultaneously steaming to inspect the steamer, and upon spotting the German torpedo boats, opened fire shortly before 15:30. Elbing turned to support the destroyers, opening fire at 15:32. She quickly scored the first hit of the battle, on Galatea, though the shell failed to explode. The British turned to the north back toward the 1st Battlecruiser Squadron, with Elbing still firing at long range. She was joined by Frankfurt and Pillau, but the three cruisers had to cease fire by 16:17, as the British had drawn out of range. About fifteen minutes later, the three cruisers engaged a seaplane launched by the seaplane tender HMS Engadine. They failed to score any hits, but the aircraft was forced off after which its engine broke down and it was forced to land. The three cruisers then returned to their stations ahead of the German battlecruisers.

At around 18:30, Elbing and the rest of II Scouting Group encountered the cruiser HMS Chester; they opened fire and scored several hits on the ship. As both sides' cruisers disengaged, Rear Admiral Horace Hood's three battlecruisers intervened. His flagship HMS Invincible scored a hit on Wiesbaden that exploded in her engine room and disabled the ship. Elbing and Frankfurt each fired a torpedo at the British battlecruisers, though both missed. Elbing was briefly engaged by the battlecruisers at very long range, though she was not hit. At around 20:15, Elbing lost her port engine due to leaks in her boiler condensers. This limited her speed to 20 kn (37 km/h; 23 mph) for the next four hours.

II Scouting Group, along with the battlecruisers Seydlitz and Moltke had been ordered to take station ahead of the German line for its night cruising formation. Elbing was still having problems with her boiler condensers, and was unable to keep up the speed necessary to reach the front of the line, and so she fell in with IV Scouting Group. At 23:15, Elbing and Hamburg spotted the British cruiser Castor and several destroyers. They used the British recognition signal and closed to 1,100 yards (1,000 m) before turning on their searchlights and opening fire. Castor was hit seven times and set on fire, forcing the British to turn away. As they did, they fired several torpedoes at Elbing and Hamburg. One passed underneath Elbing but failed to explode. While this engagement was still on-going, the 2nd Light Cruiser Squadron arrived and engaged IV Scouting Group. Elbing was hit once, which destroyed her wireless transmitting station and killed four men and wounded twelve.

Shortly after midnight, the German fleet ran into the British rear destroyer screen. Elbing was by this time steaming on the port side of the German line along with Hamburg and Rostock. The dreadnought Westfalen—the first ship in the German line—opened fire first, followed quickly by Elbing, the other two cruisers, and the battleships Nassau and Rheinland. The British destroyers launched a torpedo attack, which forced the three cruisers to turn to starboard to avoid them. This pointed the cruisers directly at the German line. Elbing attempted to steam between Nassau and Posen, but Posen's captain wasn't aware of the movement until it was too late to avoid a collision. Posen turned hard to starboard, but still collided with Elbing's starboard quarter. The cruiser was holed below the waterline, which flooded the starboard engine room first. She initially took on a list of eighteen degrees, which allowed water to spread to the port engine room. With the engines shut down, steam began to condense in the pipes, which disabled the electric generators and caused the ship to lose electrical power. As water spread throughout the ship's engine compartments, the list was reduced. The ship was completely immobilized, though she was not in danger of sinking.

At 02:00, the torpedo boat S53 came alongside and took off 477 officers and men of Elbing's crew. Her commander and a small group of officers and men remained on board. They rigged an improvised sail in an attempt to bring the ship closer to shore, but at around 03:00, British destroyers were spotted to the south and the order to scuttle the ship was given. They then lowered the ship's cutter into the water and set off; while steaming back to port, they rescued the surgeon from the destroyer HMS Tipperary. At around 07:00, a Dutch trawler met the cutter and took the men to Holland. In the course of the Battle of Jutland, Elbing had fired 230 rounds of 15 cm ammunition and a single torpedo. Four of her crew were killed and twelve more were wounded.
