= HMS Garland (1913) =

Destroyer of the Royal Navy

HMS Garland was an Acasta class (later K-class) destroyer of the British Royal Navy. The Acasta class was larger and more powerful than the preceding Acorn class. Launched in 1913, the vessel served as part of the Grand Fleet during the First World War and was sold to be broken up in 1921.
