= HMS Hardy (1912) =

Destroyer of the Royal Navy

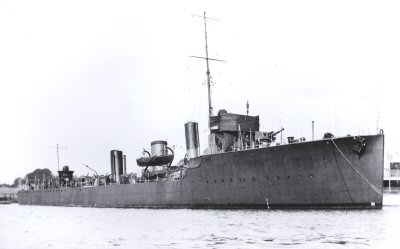
- HMS Hardy in 1912

History

United Kingdom
- Name: HMS Hardy
- Builder: John I. Thornycroft & Company
- Laid down: 13 November 1911
- Launched: 10 October 1912
- Fate: Sold for breaking to Thos. W. Ward of Briton Ferry 9 May 1921

General characteristics
- Class & type: Acasta-class destroyer
- Displacement: 892–1072 tons
- Length: 267 ft 6 in (81.5 m)
- Beam: 27 ft 0 in (8.2 m)
- Draught: 10 ft 6 in (3.2 m)
- Installed power: 24,500 ihp (18,300 kW)
- Propulsion: Yarrow-type water-tube boilers; Parsons steam turbines
- Speed: 29 knots (54 km/h; 33 mph)
- Complement: 72
- Armament: 3 × QF 4 in (102 mm) L/40 Mark IV guns, mounting P Mk. IX; 1 × QF 2 pdr pom-pom Mk. II; 2 × single tubes for 21 in (533 mm) torpedoes

HMS Hardy was a Royal Navy ship that was one of 20 Acasta-class destroyers. Serving during the First World War, she was part of the Grand Fleet at the Battle of Jutland. Hardy was built by John I. Thornycroft & Company and laid down on 13 November 1911. The ship was launched on 10 October 1912 and completed on 1 September 1913. She was the 6th vessel of the Royal Navy to bear the name Hardy and the third to receive battle honours.

== Specifications ==
The standard build of Acasta-class destroyers' had a displacement of 892 tons at standard load and 1,072 tons at deep load. The ships' dimensions were 267 ft 6in × 27 ft × 10 ft 5in. At a speed of 15 knots (28 km/h; 17 mph) the class' stated range was 1,540 nautical miles (2,850 km; 1,770 mi), while the top speed was 29 knots (54 km/h; 33 mph). Acasta-class destroyers were armed with three 4-inch (102 mm) guns and two torpedo tubes. Vessels were powered by 2-shaft, oil-fired turbines and had a fuel capacity of 199 tons of oil.

Hardy's pennant numbers were H67, H39, and H88.

== World War I ==
During the war Hardy was part of the 4th Destroyer Flotilla, a component of the British Grand Fleet.

On 16 December 1914, HMS Hardy saw action in the Dogger Bank area in the early stages of the German raid on Scarborough, Hartlepool and Whitby. It incurred significant damage and had to limp back to port under escort from HMS Spitfire. Three crew were killed and ten wounded.

On 31 May – 1 June 1916, Hardy saw action in the Battle of Jutland.

In August 1916 the 4th Destroyer Flotilla, to which Hardy belonged, was removed from fleet work and spent most of the rest of the war in Devonport, where its rosters of destroyer grew in numbers until it reached 50 ships in July, 1918.

== Fate ==
HMS Hardy was sold for breaking on 9 May 1921 to Thos. W. Ward's at Briton Ferry.
