= HMS Argyll (1904) =

Cruiser of the Royal Navy

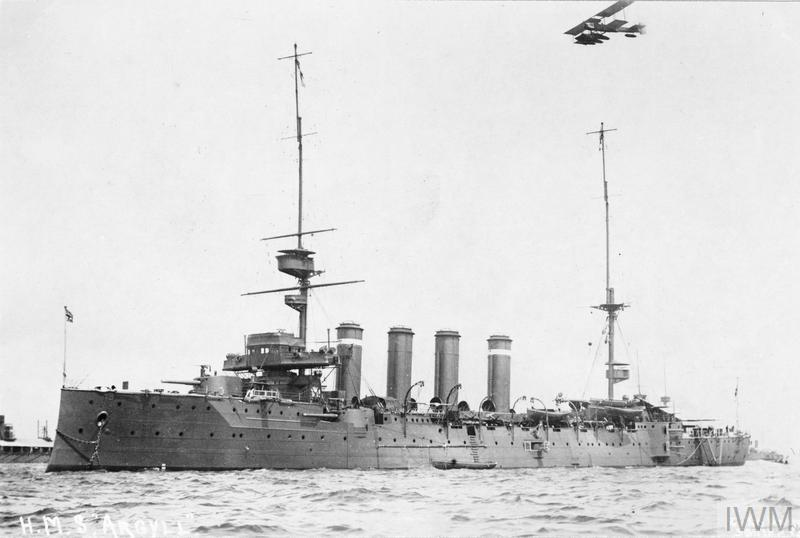
- HMS Argyll at anchor, 1909

History

United Kingdom
- Name: Argyll
- Namesake: Argyll
- Builder: Scotts Shipbuilding & Engineering, Greenock
- Laid down: 1 September 1902
- Launched: 3 March 1904
- Completed: December 1905
- Fate: Wrecked on the Bell Rock, 28 October 1915

General characteristics
- Class & type: Devonshire-class armoured cruiser
- Displacement: 10,850 long tons (11,020 t) (normal)
- Length: 473 ft 6 in (144.3 m) (o/a)
- Beam: 68 ft 6 in (20.9 m)
- Draught: 24 ft (7.3 m)
- Installed power: 21,000 ihp (16,000 kW); 16 Babcock & Wilcox boilers; 6 cylindrical boilers
- Propulsion: 2 × Shafts; 2 × 4-cylinder triple-expansion steam engines
- Speed: 22 knots (41 km/h; 25 mph)
- Complement: 610
- Armament: 4 × single BL 7.5-inch Mk I guns; 6 × single BL 6-inch Mk VII guns; 2 × single 12-pounder 8 cwt guns (Note: "Cwt" is the abbreviation for hundredweight, 12 cwt referring to the weight of the gun.); 18 × single QF 3-pounder Hotchkiss guns; 2 × single 18-inch torpedo tubes
- Armour: Belt: 2–6 in (51–152 mm); Decks: .75–2 in (19–51 mm); Barbettes: 6 in (152 mm); Turrets: 5 in (130 mm); Conning tower: 12 in (305 mm); Bulkheads: 5 in (127 mm)

HMS Argyll was one of six Devonshire-class armoured cruisers built for the Royal Navy in the first decade of the 20th century. She was assigned to the 1st Cruiser Squadron of the Channel Fleet upon completion and was transferred to the 5th Cruiser Squadron of the Atlantic Fleet in 1909. Two years later, she was detached to escort the royal yacht during King George V's trip to British India. Argyll was assigned to the 3rd Cruiser Squadron of the reserve Second Fleet in 1913.

Upon mobilisation in mid-1914, her squadron was assigned to the Grand Fleet; Argyll did not see combat before she ran aground and was wrecked in October 1915. Her crew were rescued without loss and the wreck was later salvaged before it was demolished. Nonetheless, she remains diveable.

== Design and description ==
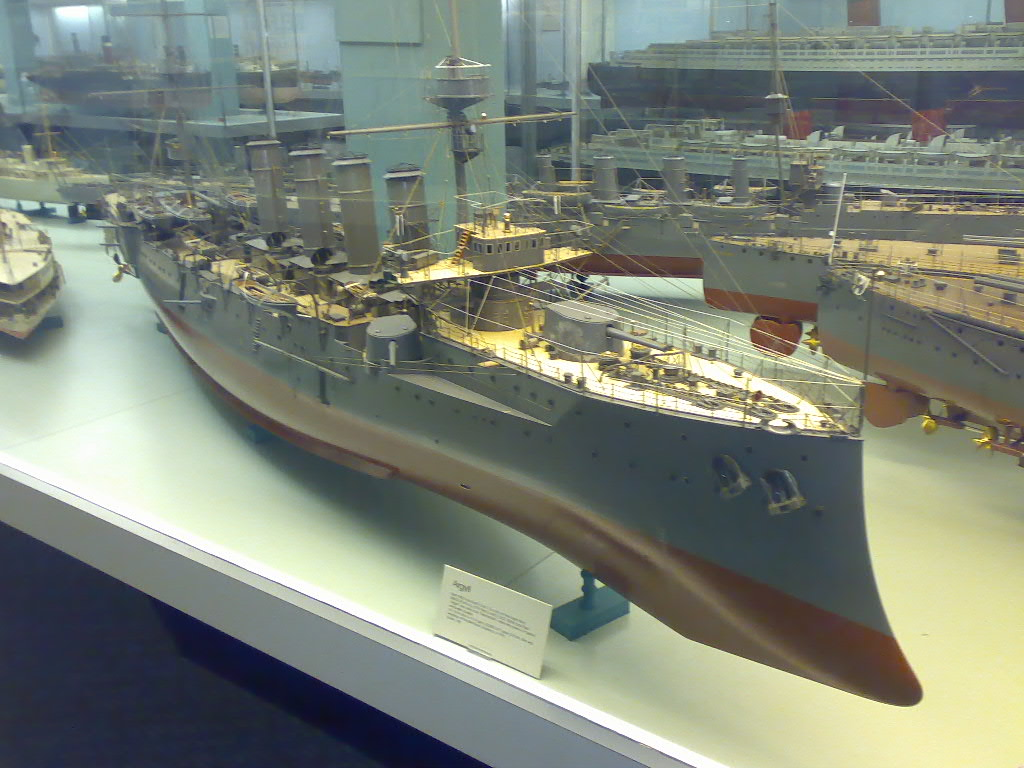
Model of Argyll at the Glasgow Museum of Transport

Argyll was designed to displace 10,850 long tons (11,020 t). The ship had an overall length of 473 feet 6 inches (144.3 m), a beam of 68 feet 6 inches (20.9 m) and a deep draught of 24 feet (7.3 m). She was powered by two 4-cylinder triple-expansion steam engines, each driving one shaft, which produced a total of 21,000 indicated horsepower (16,000 kW) and gave a maximum speed of 22 knots (41 km/h; 25 mph). The engines were powered by sixteen Babcock & Wilcox and six cylindrical boilers. Argyll was the only ship of the class not to exceed 23 knots (43 km/h; 26 mph) during her sea trials. She carried a maximum of 1,033 long tons (1,050 t) of coal and her complement consisted of 610 officers and ratings.

Her main armament consisted of four breech-loading (BL) 7.5-inch Mk I guns mounted in four single-gun turrets, one each fore and aft of the superstructure and one on each side. The guns fired their 200-pound (91 kg) shells to a range of about 13,800 yards (12,600 m). Her secondary armament of six BL 6-inch Mk VII guns was arranged in casemates amidships. Four of these were mounted on the main deck and were only usable in calm weather. They had a maximum range of approximately 12,200 yards (11,200 m) with their 100-pound (45 kg) shells. Argyll also carried 18 quick-firing (QF) 3-pounder Hotchkiss guns and two submerged 18-inch torpedo tubes. Her two 12-pounder 8 cwt guns could be dismounted for service ashore.

At some point in the war, the main deck six-inch guns of the Devonshire-class ships were moved to the upper deck and given gun shields. Their casemates were plated over to improve seakeeping and the four 3-pounder guns displaced by the transfer were landed.

The ship's waterline armour belt had a maximum thickness of six inches (152 mm) and was closed off by five-inch (127 mm) transverse bulkheads. The armour of the gun turrets was also five inches thick whilst that of their barbettes was six inches thick. The protective deck armour ranged in thickness from .75–2 inches (19–51 mm) and the conning tower was protected by twelve inches (305 mm) of armour.

== Construction and service ==
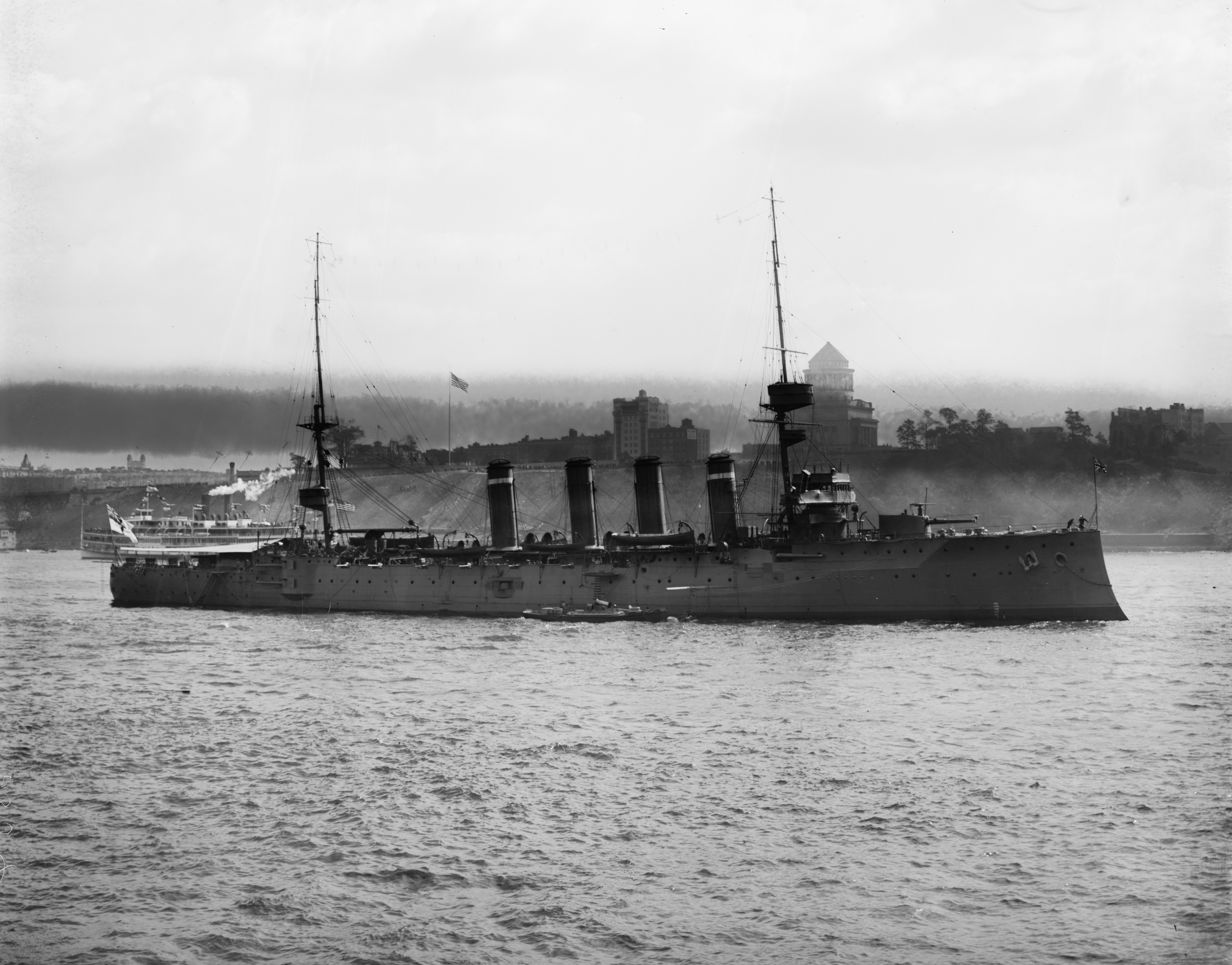
Argyll in New York, 1909. Grant's Tomb can be seen behind the ship's mast.

Argyll, named to commemorate the Scottish county, was laid down at Scotts Shipbuilding & Engineering at their Greenock shipyard on 25 March 1902 and was launched on 3 March 1904. She was completed in December 1905 and was assigned to the 1st Cruiser Squadron of the Channel Fleet in January 1906. On 25 April 1907, Argyll, along with the cruisers Hampshire, Roxburgh and Good Hope, arrived at Hampton Roads from Bermuda for the opening of the Jamestown Tercentennial Exposition. She was transferred to the 5th Cruiser Squadron of the Atlantic Fleet in 1909. Two years later, she was detached from the squadron to escort the Royal Yacht Medina during the King's trip to the Delhi Durbar in India in 1911–12. She ran aground in Plymouth Sound on 28 December 1912. The following year, she was assigned to the 3rd Cruiser Squadron of the Second Fleet.

The squadron was assigned to the Grand Fleet in mid-1914 as the Navy mobilised for war. It spent much of its time with the Grand Fleet reinforcing the patrols near the Shetland and Faeroe Islands and the Norwegian coast where Argyll captured a German merchantman on 6 August. She ran aground on the Bell Rock near Dundee on 28 October 1915 at coordinates 56°26′N 2°23.5′W at night during a storm. During the war, lighthouses were ordered to switch their lights off for fear of assisting German U-boats in their operations, and the light was only turned on by special permission. En route Argyll sent a signal requesting the light to be turned on, but the lighthouse did not have a radio and could only be contacted by boat or visual signals. Attempts to notify the lighthouse failed, but the ship was not notified of the failure and proceeded in the expectation of using the light. Soon afterwards, she ran aground at 04:30, suffering extensive damage to much of the hull and starting a fire. Two destroyers, Hornet and Jackal, were sent and rescued her entire crew without serious injury.

The Navy salvaged all of the valuable items on board, including her guns, and she was demolished by the salvage team. In 1970, her two propellers were recovered by divers and sold for scrap. She remains a diveable wreck.

== Bibliography ==
- Chesneau, Roger & Kolesnik, Eugene M., eds. (1979). Conway's All the World's Fighting Ships 1860–1905. Greenwich: Conway Maritime Press. ISBN 0-8317-0302-4.
- Corbett, Julian. Naval Operations to the Battle of the Falklands. History of the Great War: Based on Official Documents. Vol. I (2nd, reprint of the 1938 ed.). London and Nashville, Tennessee: Imperial War Museum and Battery Press. ISBN 0-89839-256-X.
- Corbett, Julian (1997). Naval Operations. History of the Great War: Based on Official Documents. Vol. III (reprint of the 1940 second ed.). London and Nashville, Tennessee: Imperial War Museum in association with the Battery Press. ISBN 1-870423-50-X.
- Daysh, William. "The Death of HMS Argyll". www.bellrock.org.uk.
- Eger, Christopher L. (2012). "Hudson-Fulton Naval Celebration, Part I". Warship International. XLIX (2): 123–151. ISSN 0043-0374.
- Friedman, Norman (2012). British Cruisers of the Victorian Era. Barnsley, South Yorkshire, UK: Seaforth. ISBN 978-1-59114-068-9.
- Friedman, Norman (2011). Naval Weapons of World War One. Barnsley, South Yorkshire, UK: Seaforth. ISBN 978-1-84832-100-7.
- Gardiner, Robert & Gray, Randal, eds. (1985). Conway's All the World's Fighting Ships 1906–1921. Annapolis, Maryland: Naval Institute Press. ISBN 0-85177-245-5.
- Massie, Robert K. (2004). Castles of Steel: Britain, Germany, and the Winning of the Great War at Sea. London: Jonathan Cape. ISBN 0-224-04092-8.
- Sieche, Erwin F. (1990). "Austria-Hungary's Last Visit to the USA". Warship International. XXVII (2): 142–164. ISSN 0043-0374.
- Silverstone, Paul H. (1984). Directory of the World's Capital Ships. New York: Hippocrene Books. ISBN 0-88254-979-0.
