= HMS Devonshire =

Eight ships of the Royal Navy have been named HMS Devonshire, originally in honour of William Cavendish, 1st Duke of Devonshire, and later after the county of Devonshire (now called Devon).

- HMS Devonshire (1692) was an 80-gun third rate launched in 1692 and blown up in action with the French in 1707 at the Battle at the Lizard.
- HMS Devonshire (1710) was an 80-gun third rate, launched in 1710, hulked in 1740, and sold in 1760.
- HMS Devonshire (1745) was a 74-gun third rate launched in 1745 and broken up in 1772.
- HMS Devonshire (1804) was a fire ship purchased in 1804 and expended on 3 October of that year at Boulogne-sur-Mer.
- HMS Devonshire (1812) was a 74-gun third rate launched in 1812, on harbour service from 1849, and broken up in 1869.
- HMS Devonshire (1904) was a Devonshire-class armoured cruiser launched in 1904 and sold in 1921.
- HMS Devonshire (39) was a County-class heavy cruiser launched in 1927, converted to a training ship in 1947, and sold in 1954.
- HMS Devonshire (D02) was a County-class guided missile destroyer launched in 1960 and sunk as a target in 1984.

== Battle honours ==
Ships named Devonshire have earned the following battle honours:

- Barfleur, 1692
- Finisterre, 1747
- Ushant, 1747
- Louisburg, 1758
- Martinique, 1762
- Havana, 1762
- Norway, 1940
- Arctic, 1941
- Diego Suarez, 1942
