= John de Mestre Hutchison =

Royal Navy Admiral (1862-1932)

Admiral John de Mestre Hutchison CMG CVO
- Born: 4 September 1862
- Died: 9 October 1932 (aged 70)
- Military career
- Allegiance: United Kingdom
- Branch: Royal Navy (1876–1916); Royal Air Force (1918)
- Service years: 1876–1916; 1918
- Rank: Admiral
- Commands: RAF Tregantle and Withnoe Depot (1918); Royal Naval Barracks, Devonport (1911–13, 1914–16); HMS Exmouth (1909–10); HMS Devonshire (1907–09); HMS Juno (1905–07)
- Conflicts: First World War
- Awards: Companion of the Order of St Michael and St George; Commander of the Royal Victorian Order; Order of the Sacred Treasure, 2nd Class (Japan)

Admiral John de Mestre Hutchison, CMG, CVO (4 September 1862 – 9 October 1932) was a Royal Navy officer who held senior posts during the early part of the 20th century.

== Biography ==
John de Mestre Hutchison was born on was 4 September 1862, the son of Captain John Hutchison. The young Hutchison attended Eastman's Naval Academy in Southsea, Portsmouth before he joined the Royal Navy as a cadet in 1876. Hutchison was promoted to sub-lieutenant in 1882 and was promoted from lieutenant to commander on 22 June 1897. At the start of January 1903, Hutchison was promoted to captain, and by 1904 he was serving as the Extra Naval Attache to the Japanese during the Russo-Japanese War. In October 1905, Hutchison was appointed Captain of HMS Juno, serving in that appointment until May 1907. From May 1907 to March 1909 Hutchison commanded HMS Devonshire, which was part of the Atlantic Fleet.

Hutchison was appointed naval aide-de-camp to King George V on 19 September 1911. Also in 1911 Hutchison was appointed as Commodore of the RN Barracks Devonport, a post he held until 1913 when he was promoted to rear admiral (in May) and relinquished his aide de camp appointment. He retired from the Navy on 9 May 1916 but in early 1918 he was Flag Officer of the Royal Naval Air Service depot at Tregantle and Withnoe in Cornwall. On 1 April 1918 when the Royal Naval Air Service merged with the Royal Flying Corps to become the Royal Air Force, Hutchison was made a temporary colonel and granted the honorary rank of lieutenant general (both these ranks existed in the RAF during its first year). His command was probably retitled General Officer Commanding, RAF Tregantle and Withnoe Depot.

After the war in 1921, Hutchison was granted the rank of admiral as a retired officer on the Navy list. He died on 9 October 1932.

Military offices
Unknown	Captain HMS Juno; 1905–1907	Succeeded by Richard Phillimore
Preceded by Arthur Stuart	Captain HMS Devonshire; 1907–1909	Succeeded by Cuthbert Chapman
Preceded by Rosslyn Wemyss	Commodore Commanding Royal Naval Barracks, Devonport; 1911–1913	Succeeded by Arthur Ricardo
Honorary titles
Preceded by Herbert Heath	Naval Aide-de-Camp to the King; 1911–1913	Succeeded by George Ballard
