= HMS Roxburgh =

Cruiser of the Royal Navy

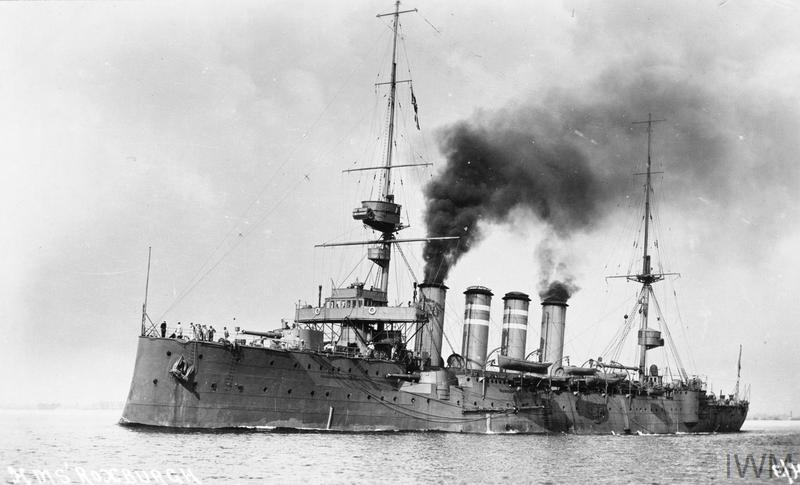
- Roxburgh

History

United Kingdom
- Name: Roxburgh
- Namesake: Roxburghshire
- Builder: London & Glasgow Shipbuilding, Govan
- Laid down: 13 June 1902
- Launched: 19 January 1904
- Completed: 5 September 1905
- Fate: Sold for scrap, 8 November 1921

General characteristics
- Class & type: Devonshire-class armoured cruiser
- Displacement: 10,850 long tons (11,020 t) (normal)
- Length: 473 ft 6 in (144.3 m) (o/a)
- Beam: 68 ft 6 in (20.9 m)
- Draught: 24 ft (7.3 m)
- Installed power: 17 Dürr boilers; 6 cylindrical boilers; 21,000 ihp (16,000 kW)
- Propulsion: 2 × shafts; 2 × triple-expansion steam engines
- Speed: 22 knots (41 km/h; 25 mph)
- Complement: 610
- Armament: 4 × single 7.5 in (190 mm) guns; 6 × single 6 in (150 mm) guns; 2 × single 12-pdr 3 in (76 mm) (Note: "Cwt" is the abbreviation for hundredweight, 12 cwt referring to the weight of the gun.); 18 × single 3-pdr (37 mm (1.5 in)) Hotchkiss guns; 2 × single 18 in (460 mm) torpedo tubes
- Armour: Belt: 2–6 in (51–152 mm); Decks: .75–2 in (19–51 mm); Barbettes: 6 in (152 mm); Turrets: 5 in (130 mm); Conning tower: 12 in (305 mm); Bulkheads: 5 in (127 mm)

HMS Roxburgh was one of six Devonshire-class armoured cruisers built for the Royal Navy in the first decade of the 20th century. She was assigned to the 1st Cruiser Squadron of the Channel Fleet upon completion and was transferred to the reserve Third Fleet in 1909. She was then assigned to the 5th Cruiser Squadron of the reserve Second Fleet in 1912 and the 3rd Cruiser Squadron the following year.

Upon mobilisation in mid-1914 her squadron was assigned to the Grand Fleet and spent much of its time patrolling the northern exits from the North Sea and the Norwegian coast. She was torpedoed in mid-1915 by a German submarine and repairs took almost a year. Roxburgh was transferred to the North America and West Indies Station in mid-1916 and spent the rest of the war escorting convoys. She rammed a German submarine while escorting a convoy in early 1918. The ship was reduced to reserve in 1919, but recommissioned later that year for use as a radio training ship. Roxburgh was paid off in 1920 and sold for scrap the following year.

== Design and description ==
Roxburgh was designed to displace 10,850 long tons (11,020 t). The ship had an overall length of 473 feet 6 inches (144.3 m), a beam of 68 feet 6 inches (20.9 m) and a deep draught of 24 feet (7.3 m). She was powered by two 4-cylinder triple-expansion steam engines, each driving one shaft, which produced a total of 21,000 indicated horsepower (16,000 kW) and gave a maximum speed of 22 knots (41 km/h; 25 mph). The engines were powered by seventeen Dürr and six cylindrical boilers. She carried a maximum of 1,033 long tons (1,050 t) of coal and her complement consisted of 610 officers and ratings.

Her main armament consisted of four breech-loading (BL) 7.5-inch Mk I guns mounted in four single-gun turrets, one each fore and aft of the superstructure and one on each side. The guns fired their 200-pound (91 kg) shells to a range of about 13,800 yards (12,600 m). Her secondary armament of six BL 6-inch Mk VII guns was arranged in casemates amidships. Four of these were mounted on the main deck and were only usable in calm weather. They had a maximum range of approximately 12,200 yards (11,200 m) with their 100-pound (45 kg) shells. Roxburgh also carried 18 quick-firing (QF) 3-pounder Hotchkiss guns and two submerged 18-inch torpedo tubes. Her two 12-pounder 8 cwt guns could be dismounted for service ashore.

At some point in the war, the main deck six-inch guns of the Devonshire-class ships were moved to the upper deck and given gun shields. Their casemates were plated over to improve seakeeping and the four 3-pounder guns displaced by the transfer were landed.

The ship's waterline armour belt had a maximum thickness of six inches (152 mm) and was closed off by five-inch (127 mm) transverse bulkheads. The armour of the gun turrets was also five inches thick whilst that of their barbettes was six inches thick. The protective deck armour ranged in thickness from .75–2 inches (19–51 mm) and the conning tower was protected by twelve inches (305 mm) of armour.

== Construction and service ==
Roxburgh, named to commemorate the Scottish county, was laid down at the Govan shipyard of the London and Glasgow Shipbuilding Company on 13 June 1902. Construction was slowed owing to problems with delivery of her boilers, with the ship being launched on 19 January 1904 and completed on 5 September 1905. She was initially assigned to the 1st Cruiser Squadron of the Channel Fleet together with most of her sister ships and remained with the squadron until beginning a refit at Devonport Royal Dockyard in December 1908. Upon its completion in August 1909, she was assigned to the reserve Third Fleet. In June 1912 the ship was transferred to the 3rd Cruiser Squadron of the Second Fleet. Six months later, she stood by the stranded merchantman SS Ludgate off the coast of Morocco.

The squadron was assigned to the Grand Fleet in mid-1914 as the Navy mobilised for war. It spent much of its time with the Grand Fleet reinforcing the patrols near the Shetland and Faeroe Islands and the Norwegian coast where she captured a German merchantman on 6 August. On 18 June 1915, Roxburgh was part of a force of cruisers from the 3rd Cruiser Squadron and the 2nd Light Cruiser Squadron, accompanied by destroyers, that set out from Rosyth on a patrol across the North Sea. The force was attacked several times by German submarines, and Roxburgh was hit in the bow by a single torpedo from SM U-38 on 20 June, but managed to return to Rosyth under her own power. The ship was under repair until April 1916. She patrolled the Norwegian coast in April 1916 and was then transferred to the North America and West Indies Station in September for convoy escort duties. On 13 February 1918 Roxburgh rammed and sank the German submarine SM U-89 north of Malin Head, Ireland, with no survivors. The ship was reduced to reserve at Plymouth Royal Dockyard in June 1919, but was recommissioned later that year for use as a radio training ship. Roxburgh was paid off in February 1920 and sold for scrap on 8 November 1921.

== Bibliography ==
- Chesneau, Roger & Kolesnik, Eugene M., eds. (1979). Conway's All the World's Fighting Ships 1860–1905. Greenwich: Conway Maritime Press. ISBN 0-8317-0302-4.
- Corbett, Julian (1997). Naval Operations. History of the Great War: Based on Official Documents. Vol. II (reprint of the 1929 second ed.). London and Nashville, Tennessee: Imperial War Museum in association with the Battery Press. ISBN 1-870423-74-7.
- Friedman, Norman (2012). British Cruisers of the Victorian Era. Barnsley, South Yorkshire, UK: Seaforth. ISBN 978-1-59114-068-9.
- Friedman, Norman (2011). Naval Weapons of World War One. Barnsley, South Yorkshire, UK: Seaforth. ISBN 978-1-84832-100-7.
- Gardiner, Robert & Gray, Randal, eds. (1985). Conway's All the World's Fighting Ships 1906–1921. Annapolis, Maryland: Naval Institute Press. ISBN 0-85177-245-5.
- Goldrick, James (1984). The King's Ships Were at Sea: The War in the North Sea August 1914–February 1915. Annapolis, Maryland: Naval Institute Press. ISBN 0-87021-334-2.
- Jellicoe, John (1919). The Grand Fleet 1914–1916: Its Creation, Development and Work. London: Cassell and Company.
- "Launch of H.M.S. Roxburgh" (PDF). The Engineer. Vol. 97. 22 January 1904. pp. 94–95.
- Massie, Robert K. (2004). Castles of Steel: Britain, Germany, and the Winning of the Great War at Sea. London: Jonathan Cape. ISBN 0-224-04092-8.
- Newbolt, Henry (1996). Naval Operations. History of the Great War Based on Official Documents. Vol. IV (reprint of the 1928 ed.). Nashville, Tennessee: Battery Press. ISBN 0-89839-253-5.
- Sieche, Erwin F. (1990). "Austria-Hungary's Last Visit to the USA". Warship International. XXVII (2): 142–164. ISSN 0043-0374.
- Silverstone, Paul H. (1984). Directory of the World's Capital Ships. New York: Hippocrene Books. ISBN 0-88254-979-0.
- "Transcript: HMS ROXBURGH - June 1916 to November 1918, British Waters, North Atlantic, Caribbean, North Atlantic Convoys". Royal Navy Log Books of the World War 1 Era. Naval-History.net.
