= Devonshire-class cruiser (1903) =

British armored cruisers

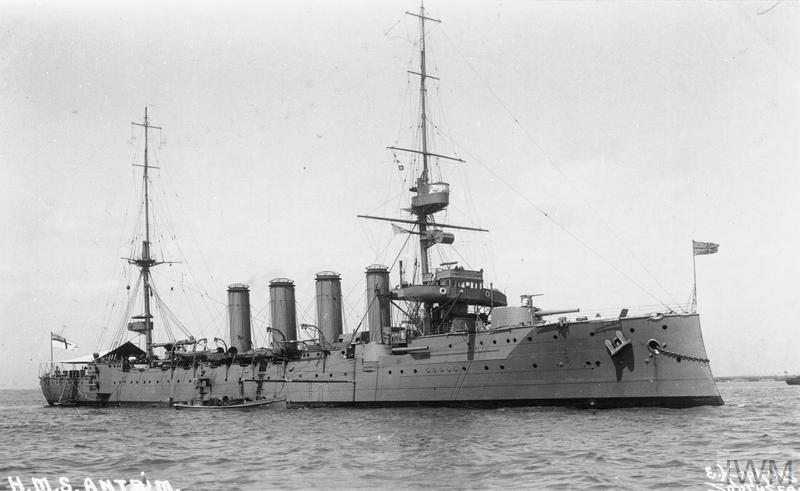
- HMS Antrim at anchor

Class overview
- Name: Devonshire class
- Builders: Armstrong Whitworth; Chatham Dockyard; John Brown; London & Glasgow; Scotts Shipbuilding; William Beardmore
- Operators: Royal Navy
- Preceded by: Monmouth class
- Succeeded by: Duke of Edinburgh class
- Built: 1902–1905
- In commission: 1905–1922
- Completed: 6
- Lost: 2
- Scrapped: 4

General characteristics
- Type: Armoured cruiser
- Displacement: 10,850 long tons (11,020 t) (normal)
- Length: 473 ft 6 in (144.3 m) (o/a)
- Beam: 68 ft 6 in (20.9 m)
- Draught: 24 ft (7.3 m)
- Installed power: 21,000 ihp (16,000 kW); 17 Yarrow boilers; 6 cylindrical boilers
- Propulsion: 2 × Shafts; 2 × 4-cylinder triple-expansion steam engines
- Speed: 22 knots (41 km/h; 25 mph)
- Complement: 610
- Armament: 4 × single BL 7.5-inch (191 mm) Mk I guns; 6 × single BL 6-inch (152 mm) Mk VII guns; 2 × single 12-pounder (3-inch, 76 mm) 8 cwt guns (Note: "Cwt" is the abbreviation for hundredweight, 12 cwt referring to the weight of the gun.); 18 × single QF 3-pounder (47 mm) Hotchkiss guns; 2 × single 18-inch (45 cm) torpedo tubes
- Armour: Belt: 2–6 in (51–152 mm); Decks: .75–2 in (19–51 mm); Barbettes: 6 in (152 mm); Turrets: 5 in (130 mm); Conning tower: 12 in (305 mm); Bulkheads: 5 in (127 mm)

The Devonshire-class cruiser was a group of six armoured cruisers built for the Royal Navy in the first decade of the 20th century. All ships of the class served in World War I. Argyll was wrecked, and Hampshire was sunk by a naval mine. The four survivors were disposed of soon after the war.

== Design and description ==
The Devonshire class was designed as improved versions of the preceding Monmouth class and were also intended for commerce protection. The armament of the new design was made more powerful by the replacement of the twin six-inch (152 mm) turrets and the forward double six-inch casemates by four 7.5-inch (190 mm) single turrets in a diamond arrangement. The ships were designed to displace 10,850 long tons (11,020 t). They had an overall length of 473 feet 6 inches (144.3 m), a beam of 68 feet 6 inches (20.9 m) and a deep draught of 24 feet (7.3 m). The Devonshire-class ships were powered by two 4-cylinder triple-expansion steam engines, each driving one shaft, which produced a total of 21,000 indicated horsepower (16,000 kW) and gave a maximum speed of 22 knots (41 km/h; 25 mph). The engines were powered by seventeen Yarrow and six cylindrical boilers. They carried a maximum of 1,033 long tons (1,050 t) of coal and their complement consisted of 610 officers and other ranks.

The main armament of the Devonshire class consisted of four breech-loading (BL) 7.5-inch Mk I guns mounted in four single-gun turrets, one each fore and aft of the superstructure and one on each side. The guns fired their 200-pound (91 kg) shells to a range of about 13,800 yards (12,600 m). Their secondary armament of six BL 6-inch Mk VII guns was arranged in casemates amidships. Four of these were mounted on the main deck and were only usable in calm weather. They had a maximum range of approximately 12,200 yards (11,200 m) with their 100-pound (45 kg) shells. The ships also carried 18 quick-firing (QF) 3-pounder Hotchkiss guns and two submerged 18-inch (450 mm) torpedo tubes. Her two 12-pounder 8-cwt guns could be dismounted for service ashore.

At some point in the war, the main deck six-inch guns of the Devonshire-class ships were moved to the upper deck and given gun shields. Their casemates were plated over to improve seakeeping and the four 3-pounder guns displaced by the transfer were landed.

The ships' waterline armour belt had a maximum thickness of six inches (152 mm) and was closed off by five-inch (127 mm) transverse bulkheads. The armour of the gun turrets was also five inches thick whilst that of their barbettes was six inches thick. The protective deck armour ranged in thickness from .75–2 inches (19–51 mm) and the conning tower was protected by twelve inches (305 mm) of armour.

== Ships ==
- Antrim, launched on 8 October 1903, sold for breaking up on 19 December 1922.
- Argyll, launched on 3 March 1904, wrecked on 28 October 1915.
- Carnarvon, launched on 7 October 1903, sold for breaking up on 8 November 1921.
- Devonshire, launched on 30 April 1904, sold for breaking up on 9 May 1921.
- Hampshire, launched on 4 September 1903, sunk by a naval mine on 5 June 1916.
- Roxburgh, launched on 19 January 1904, sold on 8 November 1921.

== Building Programme ==
The following table gives the build details and purchase cost of the members of the Devonshire class. Standard British practice at that time was for these costs to exclude armament and stores. The 1905 edition costs were compiled before the ships were complete.

Construction data
Ship	Builder	Date of			Cost according to	
Ship	Builder	Laid down	Launch	Completion	(BNA 1905)	(BNA 1906)
Devonshire	HM Dockyard, Chatham	25 Mar 1902	30 Apr 1904	24 Aug 1905	£900,792 ***	£818,167
Antrim	John Brown, Clydebank	27 Aug 1902	8 Oct 1903	23 Jun 1905	£899,050 ***	£873,625
Argyll	Scotts Shipbuilding & Engineering, Greenock	1 Sep 1902	3 Mar 1904	December 1905	£912,588 ***	£873,598
Carnarvon	William Beardmore & Company, Dalmuir	1 Oct 1902	17 Oct 1903	29 May 1905	£899,465 ***	£858,130
Hampshire	Armstrong Whitworth, Elswick	1 Sep 1902	24 Sep 1903	15 Jul 1905	£872,327 ***	£833,817
Roxburgh	London & Glasgow Shipbuilding, Govan	13 Jun 1902	9 Jan 1904	5 Sep 1905	£866,199 ***	£829,327

*** = cost published by Brassey before the ship was complete, i.e. the total cost may have been more than this.

== Bibliography ==
- Brassey, T.A. (ed)The Naval Annual 1905
- Chesneau, Roger & Kolesnik, Eugene M., eds. (1979). Conway's All the World's Fighting Ships 1860–1905. Greenwich: Conway Maritime Press. ISBN 0-8317-0302-4.
- Corbett, Julian. Naval Operations to the Battle of the Falklands. History of the Great War: Based on Official Documents. Vol. I (2nd, reprint of the 1938 ed.). London and Nashville, Tennessee: Imperial War Museum and Battery Press. ISBN 0-89839-256-X.
- Friedman, Norman (2012). British Cruisers of the Victorian Era. Barnsley, South Yorkshire, UK: Seaforth. ISBN 978-1-59114-068-9.
- Friedman, Norman (2011). Naval Weapons of World War One. Barnsley, South Yorkshire, UK: Seaforth. ISBN 978-1-84832-100-7.
- Leyland, J. and Brassey, T.A. (ed) Brassey's Naval Annual|The Naval Annual 1906
- Massie, Robert K. (2004). Castles of Steel: Britain, Germany, and the Winning of the Great War at Sea. London: Jonathan Cape. ISBN 0-224-04092-8.
- Silverstone, Paul H. (1984). Directory of the World's Capital Ships. New York: Hippocrene Books. ISBN 0-88254-979-0.
