= Saikyō Maru =

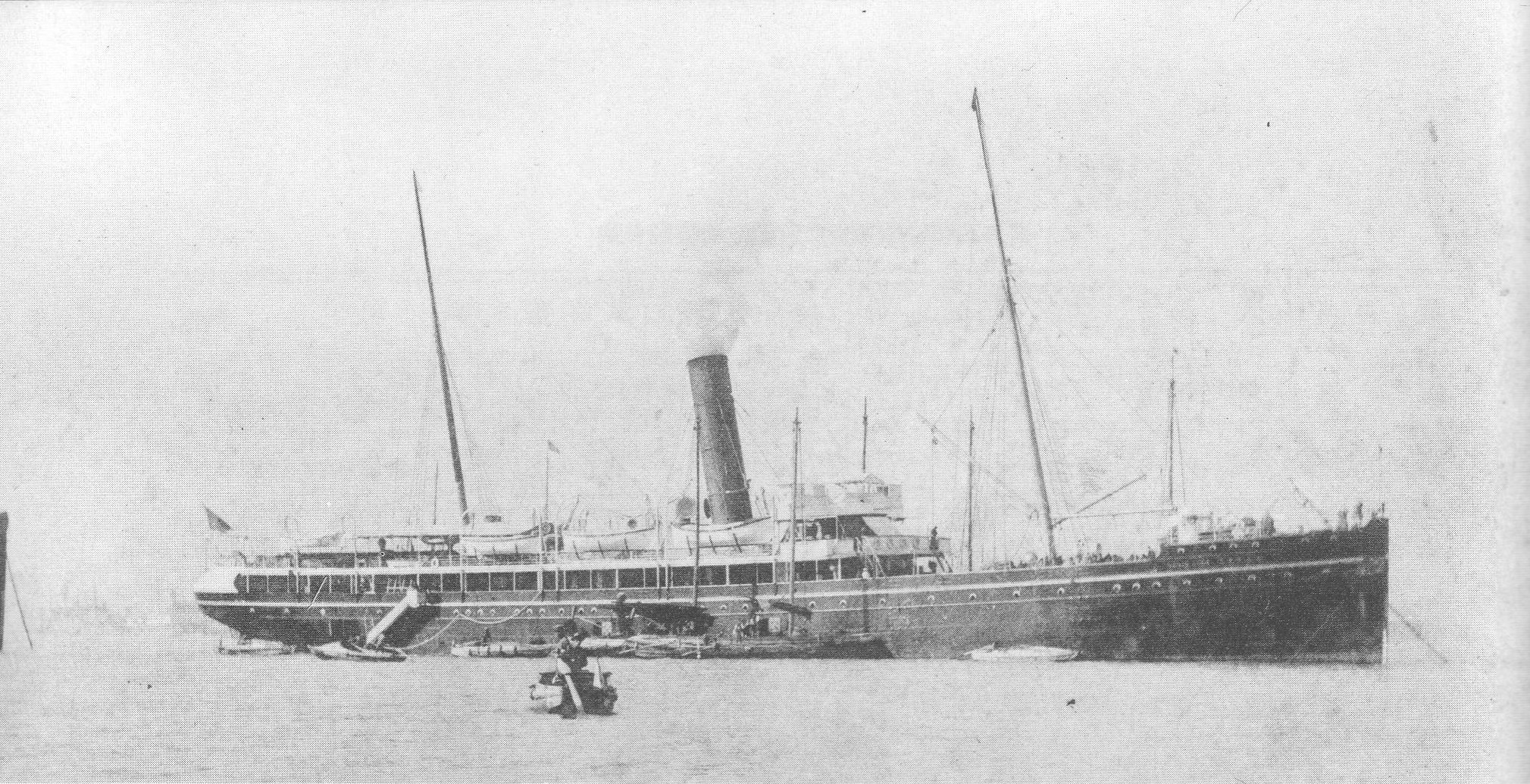

History

Japan
- Name: Saikyō Maru
- Owner: 1888: Nippon Yusen KK; 1923: Kuribayashi Shosen KK
- Port of registry: Tokyo
- Builder: London & Glasgow Engineering & Iron Shibuilding Co, Govan
- Yard number: 255
- Launched: 14 March 1888
- Identification: code letters HGQF
- Fate: Scrapped 1927

General characteristics
- Tonnage: 2,904 GRT, 1,645 NRT
- Length: 325.0 ft (99.1 m)
- Beam: 41.2 ft (12.6 m)
- Draught: 18.9 ft (5.8 m)
- Depth: 26.5 ft (8.1 m)
- Decks: 2
- Installed power: 563 NHP
- Propulsion: triple expansion engine
- Armament: As armed merchant cruiser: 1 × 120mm gun; 1 × 57mm gun; 2 × 47mm guns

Saikyō Maru (西京丸) was a steamship that was built in 1888 in Scotland for Japanese merchant service. She was requisitioned for service in the First Sino-Japanese War of 1894–95 and the Russo-Japanese War of 1904–05. She was scrapped in 1927.

== Building ==
The London and Glasgow Engineering and Iron Shibuilding Company built Saikyō Maru in its shipyard in Govan, Glasgow. She was launched on 14 March 1888. Her registered length was 325.0 ft (99.1 m), her beam was 41.2 ft (12.6 m), her depth was 26.5 ft (8.1 m), and her tonnages were 2,904 GRT and 1,645 NRT. She had a three-cylinder triple expansion steam engine that was rated at 563 NHP.

Saikyō Maru's first owner was Nippon Yusen KK, who registered her in Tokyo. Her code letters were HGQF.

== Career ==
In 1894 the Japanese government requisitioned Saikyō Maru and had her armed with one 120mm, one 57 mm and two 47mm guns to serve as an armed merchant cruiser and transport ship. She carried Admiral Viscount Kabayama Sukenori in the 1894 Battle of the Yalu River, and was commanded by John Wilson. She towed the captured ironclad battleship Zhenyuan from Weihaiwei to Port Arthur. In 1895 she was returned to her owners and resumed civilian service.

In 1904 she was requisitioned for the Russo-Japanese War as a transport. In February 1905 she was converted into a hospital ship. She was later returned to her owners.

In 1923 Kuribayashi Shosen KK bought Saikyō Maru. She was scrapped in the third quarter of 1927.
