= Lieutenant-general (United Kingdom) =

Senior rank in the British Army and the Royal Marines

Lieutenant general
- Army No. 2 and Royal Marines No. 1B service uniform insignia

- Motor car star plate
- Country: United Kingdom
- Service branch: British Army; Royal Marines
- Abbreviation: Lt Gen
- Rank group: General officers
- Rank: Three-star rank
- NATO rank code: OF-8
- Next higher rank: General
- Next lower rank: Major general
- Equivalent ranks: Vice admiral (RN); Air marshal (RAF)

Lieutenant general (Lt Gen), formerly more commonly lieutenant-general, is a senior rank in the British Army and the Royal Marines. It is the equivalent of a multinational three-star rank; some British lieutenant generals sometimes wear three-star insignia, in addition to their standard insignia, when on multinational operations.

Lieutenant general is a superior rank to major general, but subordinate to a (full) general. The rank has a NATO rank code of OF-8, equivalent to a vice-admiral in the Royal Navy and an air marshal in the Royal Air Force (RAF) and the air forces of many Commonwealth countries.

The rank insignia for both the Army and the Royal Marines is a crown over a crossed sabre and baton. During the reign of Elizabeth II, the St Edward's Crown, commonly known as the Queen's Crown, was depicted. Before 1953, and again since the accession of Charles III in 2022, the Tudor Crown has been used.

== British Army usage ==
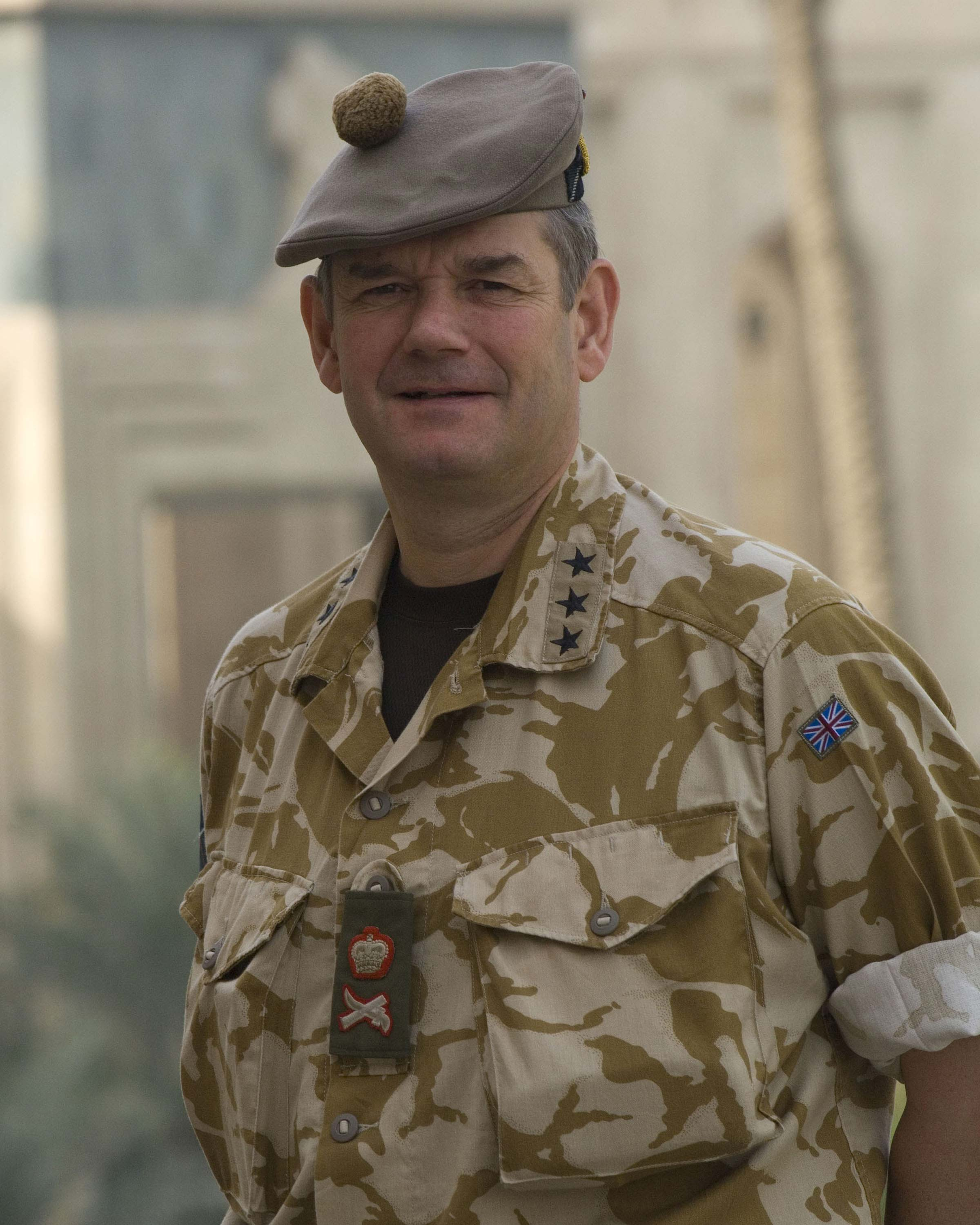
Lieutenant General John Cooper wearing both American three-star insignia and British lieutenant general insignia

Ordinarily, lieutenant general is the rank held by the officer in command of an entire battlefield corps. The General Officer Commanding NATO's Allied Rapid Reaction Corps is a British lieutenant general. Historically, I Corps and II Corps were commanded by British lieutenant generals. Additionally, three lieutenant general appointments also exist within the extant British Army's Headquarters. They are the Commander Land Forces, the Commander Standing Joint Command and the Deputy Chief of the General Staff.

== Royal Marines usage ==
Although the senior appointment in the Royal Marines, the Commandant General, has since 1996 held the lower rank of major general, prior to this date the Commandant General was a lieutenant general or full general. However, given that a few more senior positions in the British Armed Forces are open to officers from different services, Royal Marines officers can and do reach the rank of lieutenant general, being posted to Joint Forces or Ministry of Defence postings. Examples include Lieutenant-General Sir Robert Fry, Lieutenant-General Sir James Dutton and Lieutenant-General Sir David Capewell.

== Royal Air Force usage ==
From 1 April 1918 to 31 July 1919, the Royal Air Force maintained the rank of lieutenant general. It was superseded by the rank of air marshal on the following day. Although Sir David Henderson was an RAF lieutenant general, the then RAF Chief-of-Staff Sir Hugh Trenchard never held this rank. Additionally, the retired Royal Navy admiral John de Mestre Hutchison held an honorary RAF commission in the rank of lieutenant general.

The RAF lieutenant general rank insignia was similar to the naval rank insignia for a vice-admiral, with a broad band of gold being worn on the cuff with two narrower bands above it. Unlike the naval insignia, the RAF lieutenant general insignia did not have an executive curl.

== See also ==
- British and U.S. military ranks compared
- British Army Other Ranks rank insignia
- British Army officer rank insignia
