= HMS Hampshire (1903) =

20th-century Royal Navy ship

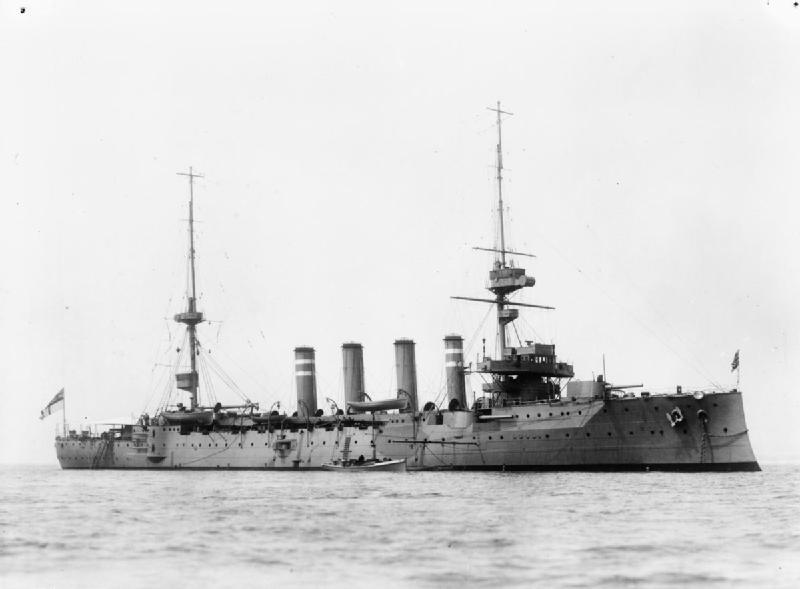
- Hampshire at anchor

History

United Kingdom
- Name: Hampshire
- Namesake: Hampshire
- Builder: Armstrong Whitworth, Elswick
- Laid down: 1 September 1902
- Launched: 24 September 1903
- Completed: 15 July 1905
- Fate: Sunk by mine, 5 June 1916

General characteristics
- Class & type: Devonshire-class armoured cruiser
- Displacement: 10,850 long tons (11,020 t) (normal)
- Length: 473 ft 6 in (144.3 m) (o/a)
- Beam: 68 ft 6 in (20.9 m)
- Draught: 24 ft (7.3 m)
- Installed power: 17 × Yarrow boilers; 6 × cylindrical boilers; 21,000 ihp (16,000 kW)
- Propulsion: 2 × shafts; 2 × quadruple-expansion steam engines
- Speed: 22 knots (41 km/h; 25 mph)
- Capacity: 1,033 long tons (1,050 t) coal
- Complement: 610
- Armament: 4 × single 7.5 in (191 mm) guns; 6 × single 6 in (152 mm) guns; 2 × single 12 pdr 8 cwt guns (Note: "Cwt" is the abbreviation for hundredweight, 12 cwt referring to the weight of the gun.); 18 × single 3 pdr Hotchkiss guns; 2 × single 18 in (457 mm) torpedo tubes
- Armour: Belt: 2–6 in (51–152 mm); Decks: .75–2 in (19–51 mm); Barbettes: 6 in (152 mm); Turrets: 5 in (130 mm); Conning tower: 12 in (305 mm); Bulkheads: 5 in (127 mm)

HMS Hampshire was one of six Devonshire-class armoured cruisers built for the Royal Navy in the first decade of the 20th century. She was assigned to the 1st Cruiser Squadron of the Channel Fleet upon completion. After a refit, she was assigned to the reserve Third Fleet in 1909 before going to the Mediterranean Fleet in 1911. She was transferred to the China Station in 1912 and remained there until the start of the First World War in August 1914.

The ship hunted for German commerce raiders until she was transferred to the Grand Fleet at the end of 1914. She was assigned to the 7th Cruiser Squadron upon her return home. She was transferred to the 2nd Cruiser Squadron in 1916 and was present at the Battle of Jutland. Several days later, on 5 June, she was sailing to Arkhangelsk, Russia, carrying the Secretary of State for War, Field Marshal Lord Kitchener, when she is believed to have struck a mine laid by a German submarine. She sank with 737 of 749 people aboard killed, including Kitchener and his staff. Rumours later circulated of German spies and sabotage being involved in the sinking. Her wreck is listed under the Protection of Military Remains Act 1986, though parts were later salvaged. Several films have been made exploring the circumstances of her loss.

== Design and description ==
Hampshire was designed to displace 10,850 long tons (11,020 t). The ship had an overall length of 473 feet 6 inches (144.3 m), a beam of 68 feet 6 inches (20.9 m) and a deep draught of 24 feet (7.3 m). She was powered by two 4-cylinder triple-expansion steam engines, each driving one shaft, which produced a total of 21,000 indicated horsepower (16,000 kW) and gave a maximum speed of 22 knots (41 km/h; 25 mph). The engines were powered by seventeen Yarrow and six cylindrical boilers. She carried a maximum of 1,033 long tons (1,050 t) of coal and her complement consisted of 610 officers and ratings.

Her main armament consisted of four breech-loading (BL) 7.5-inch (191 mm) Mk I guns mounted in four single-gun turrets, one each fore and aft of the superstructure and one on each side. The guns fired their 200-pound (91 kg) shells to a range of about 13,800 yards (12,600 m). Her secondary armament of six BL 6-inch (152 mm) Mk VII guns was arranged in casemates amidships. Four of these were mounted on the main deck and were only usable in calm weather. They had a maximum range of approximately 12,200 yards (11,200 m) with their 100-pound (45 kg) shells. Hampshire also carried 18 quick-firing (QF) 3-pounder Hotchkiss guns and two submerged 18-inch (457 mm) torpedo tubes. Her two 12-pounder 8 cwt guns could be dismounted for service ashore.

At some point in the First World War, the main deck six-inch guns of the Devonshire-class ships were moved to the upper deck and given gun shields. Their casemates were plated over to improve seakeeping and the four 3-pounder guns displaced by the transfer were landed.

The ship's waterline armour belt had a maximum thickness of 6 inches (152 mm) and was closed off by 5-inch (127 mm) transverse bulkheads. The armour of the gun turrets was also five inches thick, whilst that of their barbettes was six inches thick. The protective deck armour ranged in thickness from 0.75–2 inches (19–51 mm) and the conning tower was protected by 12 inches (305 mm) of armour.

== Construction and service ==
Hampshire, named to commemorate the English county, was laid down by Armstrong Whitworth at their Elswick shipyard on 1 September 1902 and launched on 24 September 1903. She was completed on 15 July 1905 and was initially assigned to the 1st Cruiser Squadron of the Channel Fleet together with most of her sister ships. She began a refit at Portsmouth Royal Dockyard in December 1908 and was then assigned to the reserve Third Fleet in August 1909. She recommissioned in December 1911 for her assignment with the 6th Cruiser Squadron of the Mediterranean Fleet and was transferred to the China Station in 1912.

=== First World War ===
When the war began, she was in Wei Hai Wei, and was assigned to the small squadron led by Vice Admiral Martyn Jerram, commander-in-chief of the China Station. She was ordered to destroy the German radio station at Yap together with the armoured cruiser Minotaur and the light cruiser Newcastle. En route, the ships captured the collier SS Elspeth on 11 August and sank her; Hampshire was too short on coal by then to make the island so Jerram ordered her back to Hong Kong with the crew of the Elspeth. At the end of the month, she was ordered down to the Dutch East Indies to search for any German ships at sea, narrowly missing the German light cruiser Emden. The German ship had not been reported since the war began and she sailed into the Bay of Bengal and began preying upon unsuspecting British shipping beginning on 14 September. Hampshire was ordered there to search for Emden and remained there through October and November, together with the armed merchant cruiser Empress of Asia, looking for the raider until she was destroyed on 9 November by HMAS Sydney. Hampshire then escorted an ANZAC troop convoy through the Indian Ocean and Red Sea to Egypt. Hampshire was refitted in Gibraltar in December before returning home to serve with the Grand Fleet. She was assigned the 7th Cruiser Squadron in January 1915 and was detached in November to escort shipping in the White Sea. She returned home in time to participate in the Battle of Jutland on 31 May 1916 with the 2nd Cruiser Squadron. During the battle, she was never actually engaged and only fired four salvos at the German II Scouting Group that fell well short of their targets, in addition to shooting at illusory submarine periscopes throughout the day.

=== Last voyage and sinking ===
Immediately after the battle, she was ordered to carry Lord Kitchener from Scapa Flow on a diplomatic mission to Russia via the port of Arkhangelsk. Due to the gale-force conditions, it was decided that Hampshire would sail through the Pentland Firth, then turn north along the western coast of the Orkney Islands. This course would provide a lee from the strong winds, allowing escorting destroyers to keep pace with her. She departed Scapa Flow at 16:45 and about an hour later rendezvoused with her two escorts, the Acasta-class destroyers Unity and Victor. As the ships turned to the northwest, the gale increased and shifted direction so that the ships were facing it head on. This caused the destroyers to fall behind Hampshire. As it was considered unlikely that enemy submarines would be active in such conditions, Hampshire's Captain Savill ordered Unity and Victor to return to Scapa Flow.

Sailing alone in heavy seas, Hampshire was approximately 1.5 nautical miles (2.8 km; 1.7 mi) off Mainland in the Orkney Islands between Brough of Birsay and Marwick Head at 19:40 on 5 June when an explosion occurred and she heeled to starboard. She had struck one of several mines laid by the German minelaying submarine U-75 on 28–29 May, just before the Battle of Jutland. The detonation had holed the cruiser between bows and bridge, and the lifeboats were smashed against the side of the ship by the heavy seas when they were lowered. About 15 minutes after the explosion, Hampshire sank by the bow. Of the 735 crewmembers and 14 passengers aboard, only 12 crew survived after coming ashore on three Carley floats. A total of 737 were lost, including Kitchener and all the members of the mission to Russia. The sinking happened 12 miles north of the nearest lifeboat station at Stromness. There is speculation whether lifeboat intervention would have made any difference given the conditions, but the lifeboat was never called out.

Fritz Joubert Duquesne – a Boer and German spy – claimed to have assumed the identity of Russian Count Boris Zakrevsky and joined Kitchener in Scotland. Duquesne supposedly signalled a German U-boat shortly after departing Scapa Flow to alert them that Kitchener's ship was approaching. He was then rescued by the submarine as Hampshire sank. In the 1930s and 1940s, he ran the Duquesne Spy Ring and was captured by the FBI along with 32 other Nazi agents in the largest espionage conviction in U.S. history. However, Duquesne's story contains "numerous improbabilities", and there are "no records" to corroborate any part of it.

==== Wreck ====
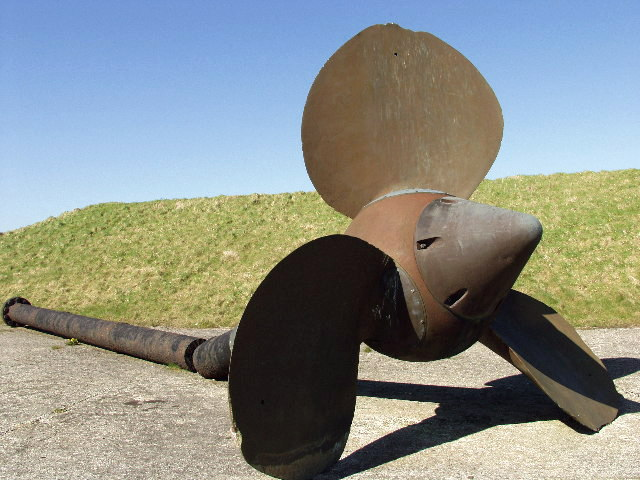
Salvaged propeller and shaft from Hampshire

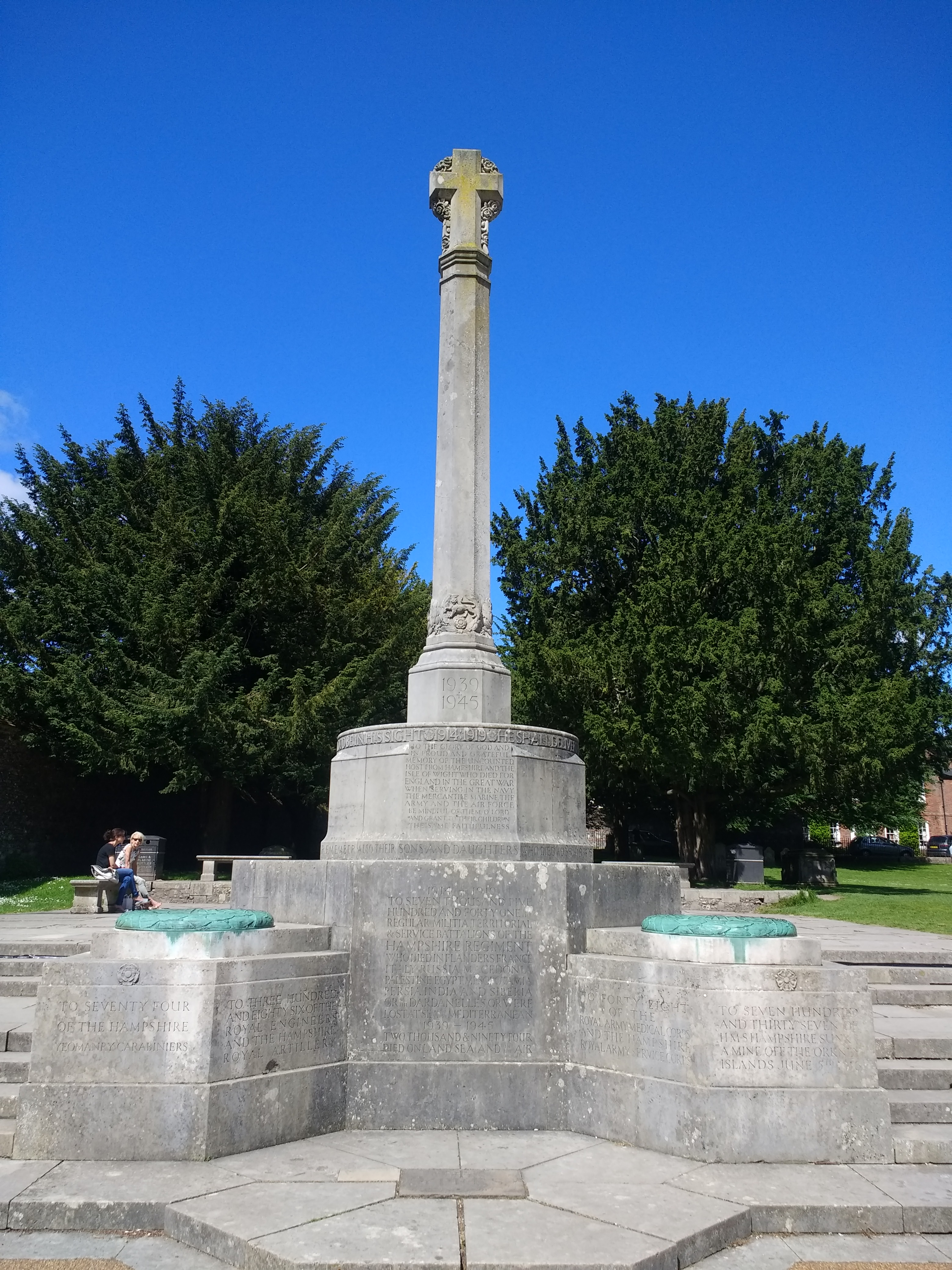
Hampshire, Isle of Wight and Winchester War Memorial outside Winchester Cathedral

The wreck is designated as a controlled site under the Protection of Military Remains Act 1986 at coordinates 59°7.065′N 3°23.843′W and diving is forbidden without a licence. The ship is upside down at a depth of 180–230 feet (30–38 fathoms; 55–70 m) of water.

== Memorials ==
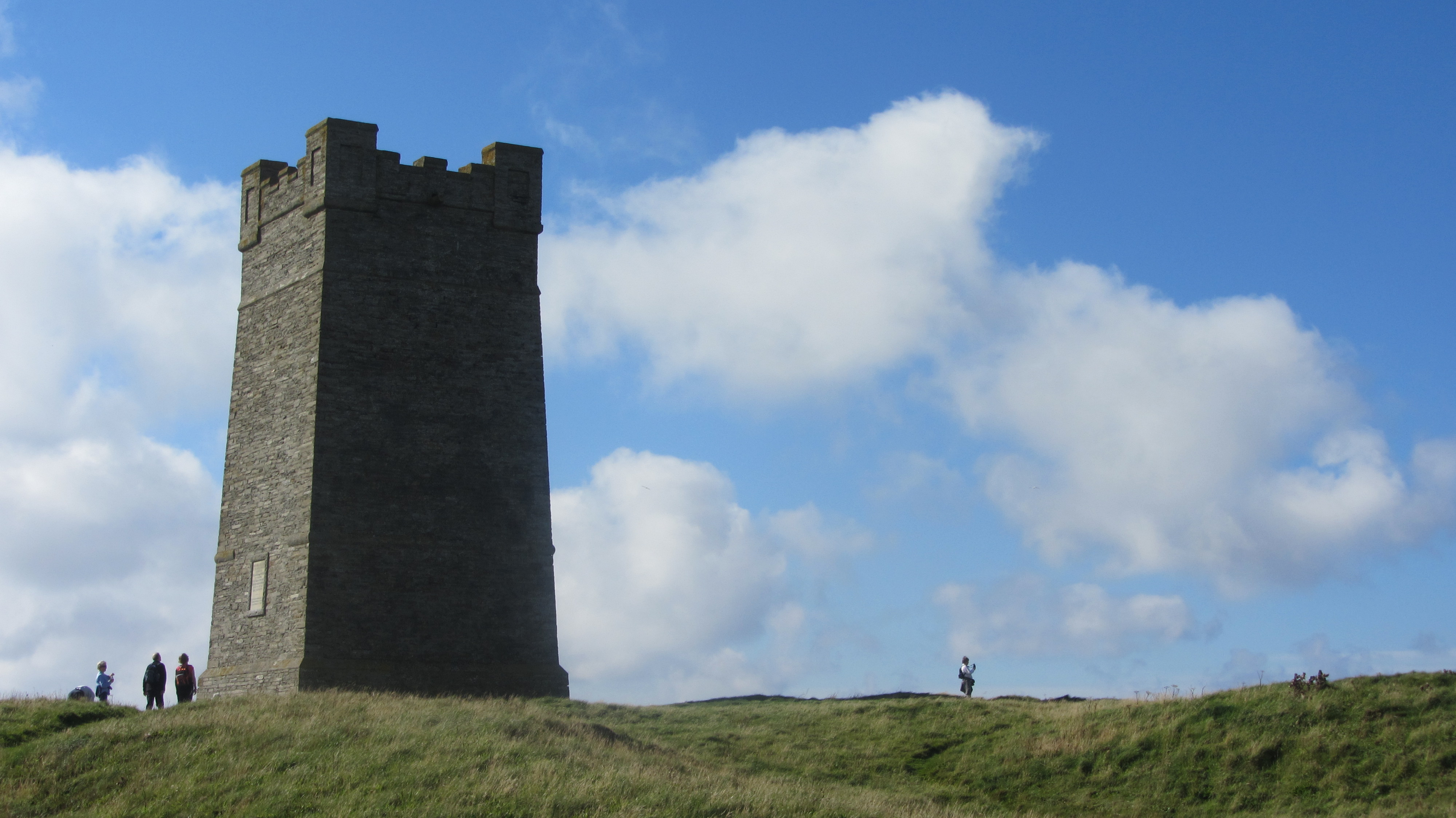
Kitchener Memorial at Marwick Head, Orkney

In 1983, one propeller and part of Hampshire's drive shaft were salvaged from the wreck. They are now on view at the Scapa Flow Visitor Centre and Museum, Lyness, Hoy, Orkney. Three Vickers 3 Pounder Mk II Quick-Firing deck guns were also salvaged from the wreck. In 2021, one of these was restored to its original condition by specialist conservators in Alloa, and is now on display in the foyer of the Scapa Flow museum.

The 737 Hampshire dead are commemorated on the right-hand side of the base at the Hampshire, Isle of Wight and Winchester War Memorial outside Winchester Cathedral.

A tower was erected on Marwick Head on Mainland, Orkney, in 1926 by the people of Orkney to the memory of Kitchener and the officers and men of Hampshire. The Kitchener Memorial is a square, crenellated stone tower with the following inscription:

This tower was raised by the people of Orkney in memory of Field Marshal Earl Kitchener of Khartoum on that corner of his country which he had served so faithfully nearest to the place where he died on duty. He and his staff perished along with the officers and nearly all the men of HMS Hampshire on 5 June 1916.

== Media ==
The sinking of the ship and the events surrounding Kitchener's death are portrayed in the 1921 film How Kitchener Was Betrayed, the 1969 film Fraulein Doktor about a female spy, and the 2021 film The King's Man, a prequel to 2015's Kingsman: The Secret Service.

== Bibliography ==
- Campbell, John (1998). Jutland: An Analysis of the Fighting. New York: Lyons Press. ISBN 1-55821-759-2.
- Cassar, George H. (2004). Kitchener's War: British Strategy from 1914 to 1916. Brassey's. ISBN 978-1-57488-708-2.
- Chesneau, Roger & Kolesnik, Eugene M., eds. (1979). Conway's All the World's Fighting Ships 1860–1905. Greenwich: Conway Maritime Press. ISBN 0-8317-0302-4.
- Corbett, Julian (March 1997). Naval Operations to the Battle of the Falklands. History of the Great War: Based on Official Documents. Vol. I (2nd, reprint of the 1938 ed.). London and Nashville, Tennessee: Imperial War Museum and Battery Press. ISBN 0-89839-256-X.
- Friedman, Norman (2012). British Cruisers of the Victorian Era. Barnsley, South Yorkshire, UK: Seaforth. ISBN 978-1-59114-068-9.
- Friedman, Norman (2011). Naval Weapons of World War One. Barnsley, South Yorkshire, UK: Seaforth. ISBN 978-1-84832-100-7.
- Gardiner, Robert & Gray, Randal, eds. (1985). Conway's All the World's Fighting Ships 1906–1921. Annapolis, Maryland: Naval Institute Press. ISBN 0-85177-245-5.
- Budge, Brian; Callister, Jude; Grieve, Issy; Heath, Kevin; Hollinrake, Andrew; Irvine, James; Johnson, Keith; Kermode, Neil; Lowrey, Michael; Muir, Tom; Turton, Emily & Wade, Ben (2016) HMS Hampshire: A Century of Myths and Mysteries Unravelled. Kirkwall, Orkney, UK: Orkney Heritage Society. ISBN 0-9535945-7-2
- Massie, Robert K. (2004). Castles of Steel: Britain, Germany, and the Winning of the Great War at Sea. London: Jonathan Cape. ISBN 0-224-04092-8.
- Robertson, James C. (1993). The Hidden Cinema: British Film Censorship in Action, 1913–1975. London: Routledge. ISBN 0-203-99007-2.
- Silverstone, Paul H. (1984). Directory of the World's Capital Ships. New York: Hippocrene Books. ISBN 0-88254-979-0.
- "Transcript: HMS HAMPSHIRE – October 1914 to February 1915, Indian Ocean to UK, British Home Waters". Royal Navy Log Books of the World War 1 Era. Naval-History.net.
- Sieche, Erwin F. (1990). "Austria-Hungary's Last Visit to the USA". Warship International. XXVII (2): 142–164. ISSN 0043-0374.
- Wood, Clement (1932). The Man Who Killed Kitchener: The Life of Fritz Joubert Duquesne 1879–. New York: William Faro. OCLC 1071583.
