= HMS Lynx (1913) =

Acasta-class destroyer

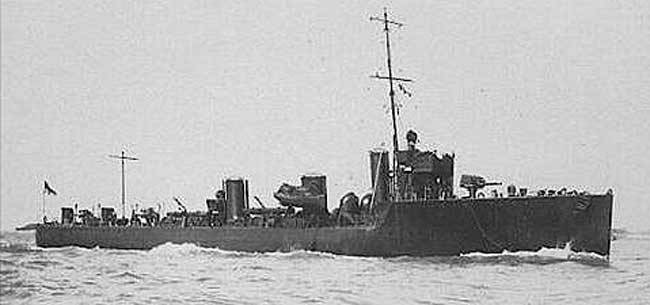
- Lynx

History

United Kingdom
- Name: Lynx
- Builder: London and Glasgow Shipbuilding Company, Govan
- Yard number: 364
- Laid down: 18 January 1912
- Launched: 20 March 1913
- Commissioned: January 1914
- Fate: Sunk by a naval mine, 9 August 1915

General characteristics (as built)
- Class & type: Acasta-class destroyer
- Displacement: 1,072 long tons (1,089 t) (deep load)
- Length: 267 ft 6 in (81.5 m)
- Beam: 27 ft (8.2 m)
- Draught: 9 ft 6 in (2.9 m)
- Installed power: 4 Yarrow boilers; 24,500 shp (18,300 kW)
- Propulsion: 2 shafts; 1 steam turbine
- Speed: 29 knots (54 km/h; 33 mph)
- Range: 1,540 nmi (2,850 km; 1,770 mi) at 15 knots (28 km/h; 17 mph)
- Complement: 73
- Armament: 3 × single 4 in (102 mm) guns; 2 × single 21 in (533 mm) torpedo tubes

HMS Lynx was one of 20 Acasta-class destroyers built for the Royal Navy in the 1910s. Completed in 1914 she saw active service in the First World War.

== Design and description ==
The Acasta class was based on an enlarged HMS Firedrake, a very fast Yarrow Special of the Acheron class. The Acastas had an overall length of 267 feet 6 inches (82 m), a beam of 27 feet (8.2 m), and a normal draught of 9 feet 6 inches (2.9 m). The ships displaced 1,072 long tons (1,089 t) at deep load and their crew numbered 73 officers and ratings.

The destroyers were powered by a single Parsons steam turbine that drove two propeller shafts using steam provided by four Yarrow boilers. The engines developed a total of 24,500 shaft horsepower (18,300 kW) and were designed for a speed of 29 knots (54 km/h; 33 mph). Lynx reached a speed of 31.9 knots (59.1 km/h; 36.7 mph) from 26,041 shp (19,419 kW) during her sea trials. The Acastas had a range of 1,540 nautical miles (2,850 km; 1,770 mi) at a cruising speed of 15 knots (28 km/h; 17 mph).

The primary armament of the ships consisted of three BL 4-inch (102 mm) Mk VIII guns in single, unprotected pivot mounts. One gun was on the forecastle and two were aft of the superstructure. The destroyers were equipped with a pair of single rotating mounts for 21-inch (533 mm) torpedo tubes amidships and carried two reload torpedoes.

== Construction and career ==
Lynx was ordered under the 1911–1912 Naval Programme from the London and Glasgow Shipbuilding Company. The ship was laid down at the company's Govan shipyard on 18 January 1912, launched on 20 March 1913 and commissioned in January 1914.

Lynx left Cromarty with two half-divisions of the Fourth Destroyer Flotilla on 15 December 1914 as part of the response to the German bombardment of Scarborough. At 05:15 on 16 December 1914 she sighted the German destroyer SMS V155, and summoned her destroyer squadron to investigate. In a brief skirmish which took place with a force of German destroyers and cruisers, Lynx was hit several times by German shells. She sustained minor damage to a propeller and her forward magazine was flooded but only had one man wounded. Her steering gear jammed and the rest of the force made the error of following her, thus ending the pursuit.

On 9 August 1915 Lynx struck a mine off the Moray Firth by the German raider Meteor and sank. Sixty-three men were lost, including her captain. Four officers and twenty-two ratings survived.

== Bibliography ==
- Colledge, J. J.; Warlow, Ben (2006) [1969]. Ships of the Royal Navy: The Complete Record of All Fighting Ships of the Royal Navy from the 15th Century to the Present (3rd Rev ed.). London: Chatham Publishing. ISBN 978-1-86176-281-8. OCLC 67375475.
- Friedman, Norman (2009). British Destroyers: From Earliest Days to the Second World War. Barnsley, UK: Seaforth Publishing. ISBN 978-1-84832-049-9.
- Gardiner, Robert & Gray, Randal, eds. (1985). Conway's All The World's Fighting Ships 1906–1921. London: Conway Maritime Press. ISBN 0-85177-245-5.
- March, Edgar J. (1966). British Destroyers: A History of Development, 1892–1953; Drawn by Admiralty Permission From Official Records & Returns, Ships' Covers & Building Plans. London: Seeley Service. OCLC 164893555.
