= HMS Antrim (1903) =

Cruiser of the Royal Navy

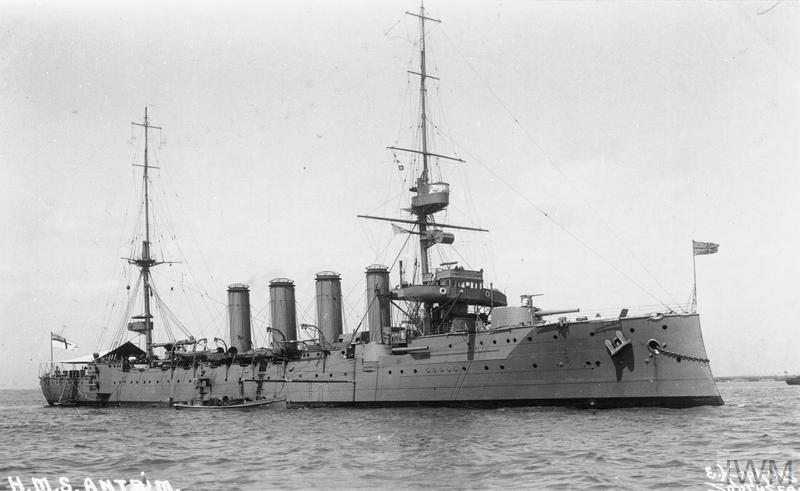
- Antrim at anchor

History

United Kingdom
- Name: HMS Antrim
- Namesake: County Antrim
- Builder: John Brown & Co., Clydeside
- Laid down: 27 August 1902
- Launched: 8 October 1903
- Completed: 23 June 1905
- Fate: Sold for scrap, 19 December 1922

General characteristics
- Class & type: Devonshire-class armoured cruiser
- Displacement: 10,850 long tons (11,020 t) (normal)
- Length: 473 ft 6 in (144.3 m) (o/a)
- Beam: 68 ft 6 in (20.9 m)
- Draught: 24 ft (7.3 m)
- Installed power: 21,000 ihp (16,000 kW); 17 Yarrow boilers; 6 cylindrical boilers
- Propulsion: 2 × Shafts; 2 × 4-cylinder triple-expansion steam engines
- Speed: 22 knots (41 km/h; 25 mph)
- Complement: 610
- Armament: 4 × single BL 7.5-inch Mk I guns; 6 × single BL 6-inch Mk VII guns; 2 × single 12-pounder 8 cwt guns (Note: "Cwt" is the abbreviation for hundredweight, 12 cwt referring to the weight of the gun.); 18 × single QF 3-pounder Hotchkiss guns; 2 × single 18-inch torpedo tubes
- Armour: Belt: 2–6 in (51–152 mm); Decks: .75–2 in (19–51 mm); Barbettes: 6 in (152 mm); Turrets: 5 in (130 mm); Conning tower: 12 in (305 mm); Bulkheads: 5 in (127 mm)

HMS Antrim was a Devonshire-class armoured cruiser built for the Royal Navy in the first decade of the 20th century. She was assigned to the 1st Cruiser Squadron of the Channel Fleet upon completion in 1905 and was transferred to the 2nd Cruiser Squadron of the Atlantic Fleet in 1907. She was assigned to the reserve Third Fleet in 1909 and then became flagship of the 3rd Cruiser Squadron of the reserve Second Fleet in 1913.

Upon mobilisation in mid-1914 her squadron was assigned to the Grand Fleet and spent much of its time patrolling the northern exits from the North Sea. Antrim was sent to Arkhangelsk in mid-1916 and then to the North America and West Indies Station for convoy escort duties. She was paid off at the end of 1917, but was recommissioned in mid-1918 as a convoy escort. The ship was in reserve by 1919, but conducted radio and Asdic trials in 1920 before becoming a training ship in 1922. Antrim was sold for scrap at the end of the year.

== Design and description ==
Antrim was designed to displace 10,850 long tons (11,020 t). The ship had an overall length of 473 feet 6 inches (144.3 m), a beam of 68 feet 6 inches (20.9 m) and a deep draught of 24 feet (7.3 m). She was powered by two 4-cylinder triple-expansion steam engines, each driving one shaft, which produced a total of 21,000 indicated horsepower (16,000 kW) and gave a maximum speed of 22 knots (41 km/h; 25 mph). The engines were powered by seventeen Yarrow and six cylindrical boilers. She carried a maximum of 1,033 long tons (1,050 t) of coal and her complement consisted of 610 officers and ratings.

Her main armament consisted of four breech-loading (BL) BL 7.5-inch Mk I guns mounted in four single-gun turrets, one each fore and aft of the superstructure and one on each side. The guns fired their 200-pound (91 kg) shells to a range of about 13,800 yards (12,600 m). Her secondary armament of six BL 6-inch Mk VII guns was arranged in casemates amidships. Four of these were mounted on the main deck and were only usable in calm weather. They had a maximum range of approximately 12,200 yards (11,200 m) with their 100-pound (45 kg) shells. Antrim also carried 18 quick-firing (QF) 3-pounder Hotchkiss guns and two submerged 18-inch torpedo tubes. Her two 12-pounder 8 cwt guns could be dismounted for service ashore.

At some point in the war, the main deck six-inch guns of the Devonshire-class ships were moved to the upper deck and given gun shields. Their casemates were plated over to improve seakeeping and the four 3-pounder guns displaced by the transfer were landed.

The ship's waterline armour belt had a maximum thickness of six inches (152 mm) and was closed off by five-inch (127 mm) transverse bulkheads. The armour of the gun turrets was also five inches thick whilst that of their barbettes was six inches thick. The protective deck armour ranged in thickness from .75–2 inches (19–51 mm) and the conning tower was protected by twelve inches (305 mm) of armour.

== Construction and service ==
Antrim, named to commemorate the Irish county, was laid down by John Brown & Company at their Clydeside shipyard on 27 August 1902 and launched on 8 October 1903. She was completed on 23 June 1905 and was initially assigned to the 1st Cruiser Squadron of the Channel Fleet together with most of her sister ships. She was sent to Casablanca, Morocco August 1907 following an insurrection that led to the bombardment of Casablanca. She was transferred to the 2nd Cruiser Squadron of the Atlantic Fleet in March 1907 and was then assigned to the reserve Third Fleet at Devonport in April 1909. She was moved to the Mersey during the 1911 Liverpool general transport strike. In December 1912 the ship became the flagship of the 3rd Cruiser Squadron of the Second Fleet.

The squadron was assigned to the Grand Fleet in mid-1914 as the Navy mobilised for war. It spent much of its time with the Grand Fleet reinforcing the patrols near the Shetland and Faeroe Islands and the Norwegian coast where Antrim captured a German merchantman on 6 August. Two months later, she was unsuccessfully attacked by the German submarine U-16 on 9 October. Despite numerous sorties with the main body of the Grand Fleet, she did not see combat. The ship was sent to Archangelsk in June 1916 and was then transferred for convoy escort duties to the North America and West Indies Station. Antrim returned home in December 1917 and was paid off. She was recommissioned in August 1918 and resumed her former duties until the end of the war in November.

She was in reserve at the Nore in 1919, but was modified to conduct radio and Asdic trials. She recommissioned in March 1920 for the trials and became a cadet training ship in 1922. Antrim was sold for scrap on 19 December 1922 and was subsequently broken up at Blyth, Northumberland.

== Bibliography ==
- Chesneau, Roger & Kolesnik, Eugene M., eds. (1979). Conway's All the World's Fighting Ships 1860–1905. Greenwich: Conway Maritime Press. ISBN 0-8317-0302-4.
- Corbett, Julian. Naval Operations to the Battle of the Falklands. History of the Great War: Based on Official Documents. Vol. I (2nd, reprint of the 1938 ed.). London and Nashville, Tennessee: Imperial War Museum and Battery Press. ISBN 0-89839-256-X.
- Corbett, Julian (1997). Naval Operations. History of the Great War: Based on Official Documents. Vol. II (reprint of the 1929 second ed.). London and Nashville, Tennessee: Imperial War Museum in association with the Battery Press. ISBN 1-870423-74-7.
- Dodson, Aidan (2026). "The Cadet Training Ships of the Royal Navy". In Jordan, John (ed.). Warship 2026. Osprey Publishing. pp. 156–174. ISBN 978-1-4728-7259-3.
- Friedman, Norman (2012). British Cruisers of the Victorian Era. Barnsley, South Yorkshire, UK: Seaforth. ISBN 978-1-59114-068-9.
- Friedman, Norman (2011). Naval Weapons of World War One. Barnsley, South Yorkshire, UK: Seaforth. ISBN 978-1-84832-100-7.
- Gardiner, Robert & Gray, Randal, eds. (1985). Conway's All the World's Fighting Ships 1906–1921. Annapolis, Maryland: Naval Institute Press. ISBN 0-85177-245-5.
- Goldrick, James (1984). The King's Ships Were at Sea: The War in the North Sea August 1914–February 1915. Annapolis, Maryland: Naval Institute Press. ISBN 0-87021-334-2.
- Massie, Robert K. (2004). Castles of Steel: Britain, Germany, and the Winning of the Great War at Sea. London: Jonathan Cape. ISBN 0-224-04092-8.
- Newbolt, Henry (1996). Naval Operations. History of the Great War Based on Official Documents. Vol. IV (reprint of the 1928 ed.). Nashville, Tennessee: Battery Press. ISBN 0-89839-253-5.
- Silverstone, Paul H. (1984). Directory of the World's Capital Ships. New York: Hippocrene Books. ISBN 0-88254-979-0.
- "Transcript: HMS Antrim - January 1916 to December 1917, North America and West Indies Station, North Atlantic Convoys". Royal Navy Log Books of the World War 1 Era. Naval-History.net.
