= Kitchener Memorial =

Monumental tower in Birsay, Orkney Islands, Scotland

- United Kingdom
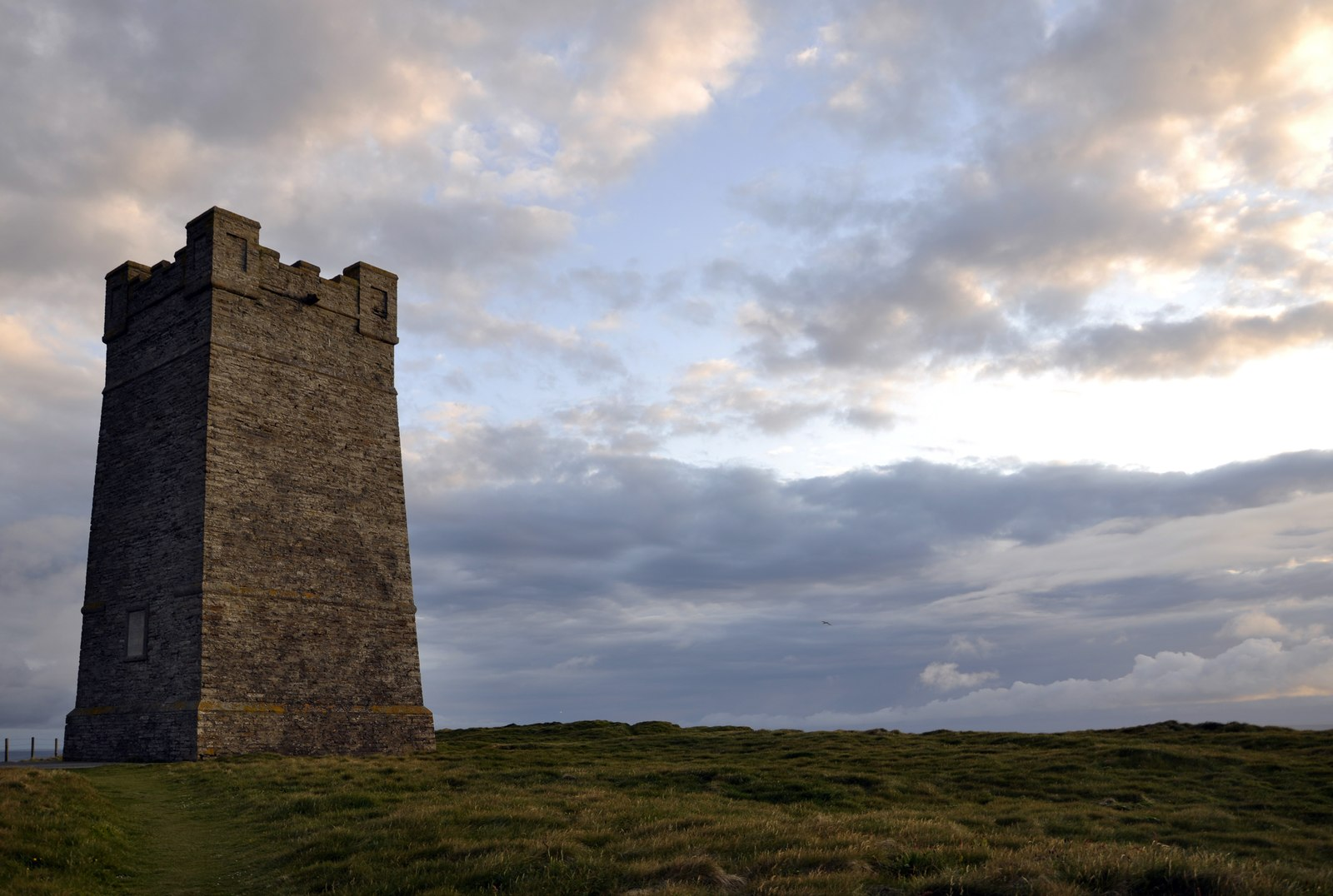
- For Lord Kitchener and servicemen killed onboard HMS Hampshire in 1916
- Unveiled: 2 July 1926; 98 years ago
- Location: 59.106267°N 3.352096°W; Marwick Head, Orkney, Scotland
- Designed by: People of Orkney

The Kitchener Memorial is a 48 ft tower war memorial in Birsay, Orkney Islands, erected after the sinking of British cruiser HMS Hampshire.

== History ==
In June 1916, cruiser HMS Hampshire was on her way to Russia on a diplomatic mission, by orders of Lord Horatio Herbert Kitchener, field marshal of the British Army. While passing Birsay, Hampshire struck a mine laid by Germany U-Boat U-75 at 19:40 on 5 June, sinking her, with a loss of 737 on board, including Lord Kitchener. There were only 12 survivors. After the First World War, the people of Orkney raised funds to construct a monument to honour Kitchener, and the other crew members onboard Hampshire who were lost that evening. The monument was named Kitchener Memorial, and was officially unveiled on 2 July 1926.

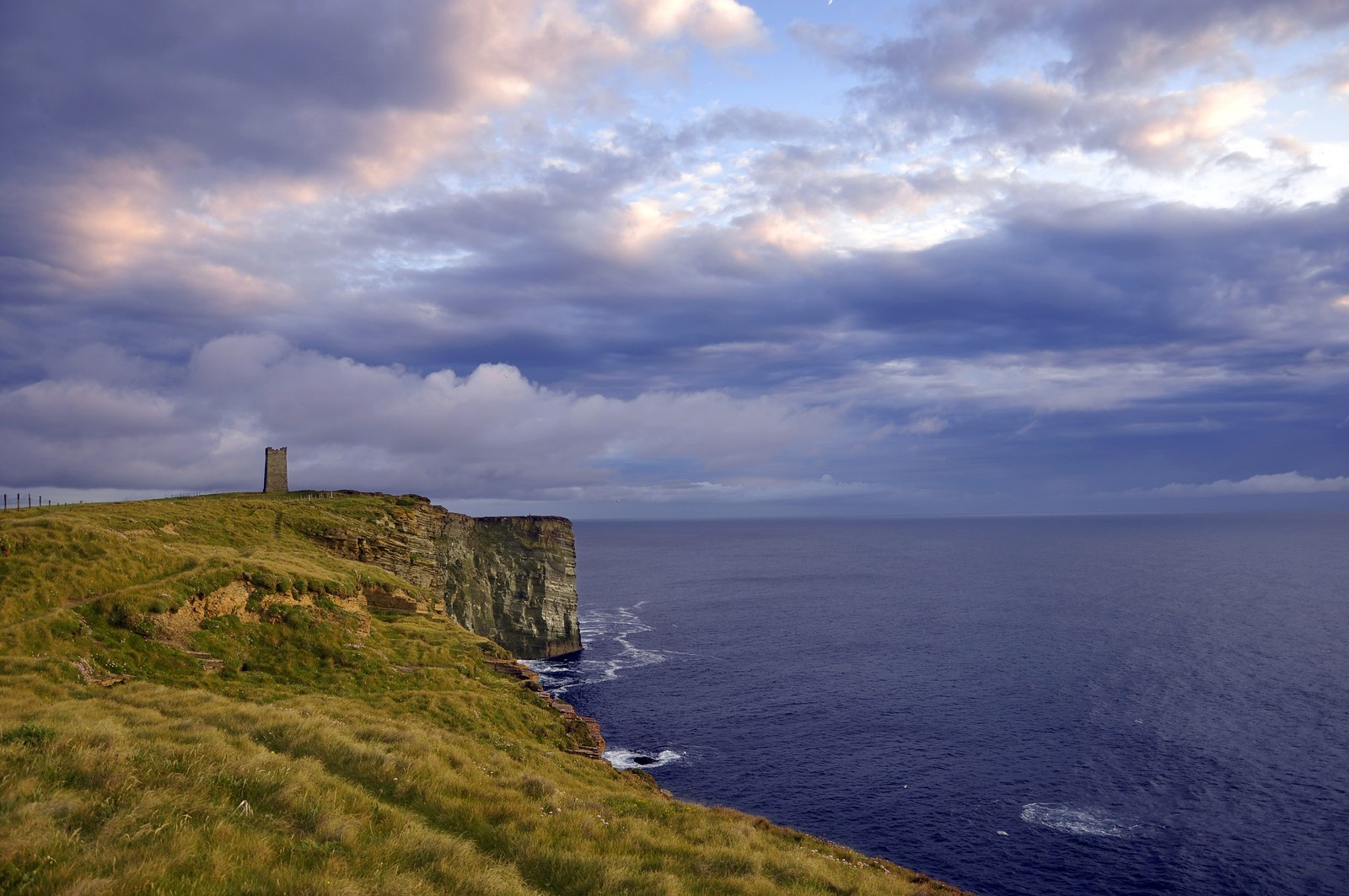
The Kitchener Memorial in 2011.

On 5 June 2016, 100 years after the sinking of Hampshire, a commemorative wall was unveiled at the base of the tower with the names of all servicemen lost in the disaster inscribed along it.

In 2020, the Kitchener Memorial was listed as one of the targets during the 'Topple the Racists' protests, however it was never touched.
