= HMS Devonshire (1904) =

Cruiser of the Royal Navy

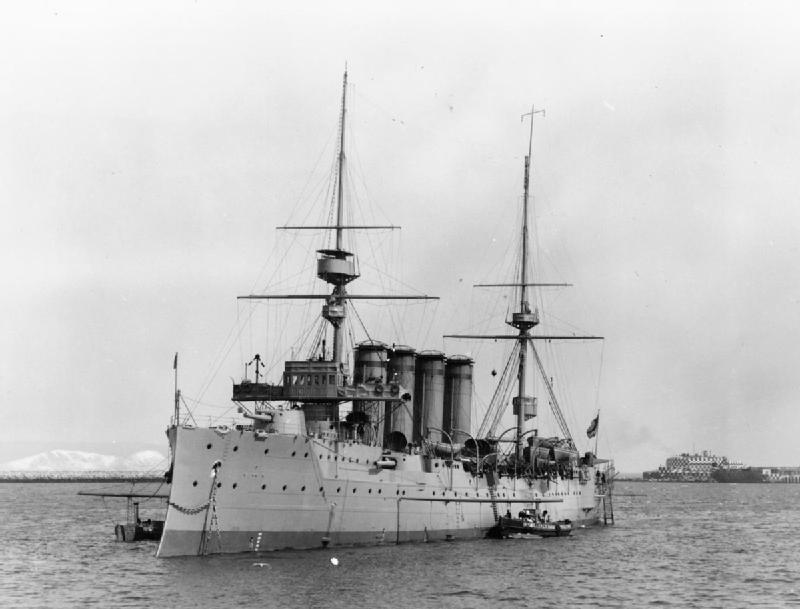
- Devonshire at anchor

History

United Kingdom
- Name: HMS Devonshire
- Namesake: Devon
- Builder: Chatham Royal Dockyard
- Laid down: 25 March 1902
- Launched: 30 April 1904
- Completed: 24 August 1905
- Fate: Sold for scrap, 9 May 1921

General characteristics
- Class & type: Devonshire-class armoured cruiser
- Displacement: 10,850 long tons (11,020 t) (normal)
- Length: 473 ft 6 in (144.3 m) (o/a)
- Beam: 68 ft 6 in (20.9 m)
- Draught: 24 ft (7.3 m)
- Installed power: 21,000 ihp (16,000 kW); 15 water-tube boilers; 6 cylindrical boilers
- Propulsion: 2 × Shafts; 2 × 4-cylinder triple-expansion steam engines
- Speed: 22 knots (41 km/h; 25 mph)
- Complement: 610
- Armament: 4 × single BL 7.5-inch Mk I guns; 6 × single BL 6-inch Mk VII guns; 2 × single 12-pounder 8 cwt guns (Note: "Cwt" is the abbreviation for hundredweight, 12 cwt referring to the weight of the gun.); 18 × single QF 3-pounder Hotchkiss guns; 2 × single 18-inch torpedo tubes
- Armour: Belt: 2–6 in (51–152 mm); Decks: .75–2 in (19–51 mm); Barbettes: 6 in (152 mm); Turrets: 5 in (130 mm); Conning tower: 12 in (305 mm); Bulkheads: 5 in (127 mm)

HMS Devonshire was the lead ship of her class of six armoured cruiser built for the Royal Navy in the first decade of the 20th century. She was assigned to the 1st Cruiser Squadron of the Channel Fleet upon completion in 1905 and was transferred to the 2nd Cruiser Squadron of the Atlantic Fleet in 1907. She was assigned to the reserve Third Fleet in 1909 and then to the 3rd Cruiser Squadron of the reserve Second Fleet in 1913.

Upon mobilisation in mid-1914 her squadron was assigned to the Grand Fleet; Devonshire did not see combat before she was transferred to the Nore in 1916. At the end of that year she was assigned to the North America and West Indies Station and spent the rest of the war escorting convoys. She was sold for scrap in 1921.

== Design and description ==
Devonshire was designed to displace 10,850 long tons (11,020 t). The ship had an overall length of 473 feet 6 inches (144.3 m), a beam of 68 feet 6 inches (20.9 m) and a deep draught of 24 feet (7.3 m). She was powered by two 4-cylinder triple-expansion steam engines, each driving one shaft, which produced a total of 21,000 indicated horsepower (16,000 kW) and gave a maximum speed of 22 knots (41 km/h; 25 mph). The engines were powered by fifteen Niclausse and six cylindrical boilers. She carried a maximum of 1,033 long tons (1,050 t) of coal and her complement consisted of 610 officers and ratings.

Her main armament consisted of four breech-loading (BL) 7.5-inch Mk I guns mounted in four single-gun turrets, one each fore and aft of the superstructure and one on each side. The guns fired their 200-pound (91 kg) shells to a range of about 13,800 yards (12,600 m). Her secondary armament of six BL 6-inch Mk VII guns was arranged in casemates amidships. Four of these were mounted on the main deck and were only usable in calm weather. They had a maximum range of approximately 12,200 yards (11,200 m) with their 100-pound (45 kg) shells. Devonshire also carried 18 quick-firing (QF) 3-pounder Hotchkiss guns and two submerged 18-inch torpedo tubes. Her two 12-pounder 8 cwt guns could be dismounted for service ashore.

At some point in the war, the main deck six-inch guns of the Devonshire-class ships were moved to the upper deck and given gun shields. Their casemates were plated over to improve seakeeping and the four 3-pounder guns displaced by the transfer were landed.

The ship's waterline armour belt had a maximum thickness of six inches (152 mm) and was closed off by five-inch (127 mm) transverse bulkheads. The armour of the gun turrets was also five inches thick whilst that of their barbettes was six inches thick. The protective deck armour ranged in thickness from .75–2 inches (19–51 mm) and the conning tower was protected by twelve inches (305 mm) of armour.

== Construction and career ==
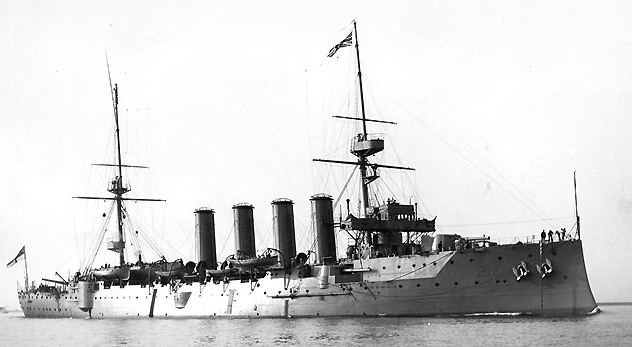

Devonshire, named to commemorate the English county, was laid down at Chatham Royal Dockyard on 25 March 1902, when the first keel-plate was laid by the Prince of Wales (later King George V). She was launched on 30 April 1904. She was completed on 24 August 1905 and was initially assigned to the 1st Cruiser Squadron of the Channel Fleet. She was transferred to the 2nd Cruiser Squadron of the Atlantic Fleet in March 1907 and was then assigned to the reserve Third Fleet at Devonport in August 1909. In 1913 the ship was assigned to the 3rd Cruiser Squadron of the Second Fleet together with most of her sister ships.

The squadron was assigned to the Grand Fleet in mid-1914 as the Navy mobilised for war. It spent much of its time with the Grand Fleet reinforcing the patrols near the Shetland and Faeroe Islands and the Norwegian coast where Devonshire captured a German merchantman on 6 August. She was refitted in September and again in February. Despite numerous sorties with the main body of the Grand Fleet, she did not see combat. She patrolled the Norwegian coast in April 1916 and was then assigned to the Nore. Devonshire was assigned to the 7th Cruiser Squadron of the Grand Fleet before she was transferred to the Atlantic to protect Allied shipping in December, based at the Royal Naval Dockyard in the Imperial fortress colony of Bermuda on the North America and West Indies Station. She remained there into 1919 and was listed for sale in May 1920. Devonshire was sold for scrap on 9 May 1921 and broken up at Barrow-in-Furness in 1923.

== Bibliography ==
- Chesneau, Roger & Kolesnik, Eugene M., eds. (1979). Conway's All the World's Fighting Ships 1860–1905. Greenwich: Conway Maritime Press. ISBN 0-8317-0302-4.
- Corbett, Julian. Naval Operations to the Battle of the Falklands. History of the Great War: Based on Official Documents. Vol. I (2nd, reprint of the 1938 ed.). London and Nashville, Tennessee: Imperial War Museum and Battery Press. ISBN 0-89839-256-X.
- Corbett, Julian (1997). Naval Operations. History of the Great War: Based on Official Documents. Vol. II (reprint of the 1929 second ed.). London and Nashville, Tennessee: Imperial War Museum in association with the Battery Press. ISBN 1-870423-74-7.
- Friedman, Norman (2012). British Cruisers of the Victorian Era. Barnsley, South Yorkshire, UK: Seaforth. ISBN 978-1-59114-068-9.
- Friedman, Norman (2011). Naval Weapons of World War One. Barnsley, South Yorkshire, UK: Seaforth. ISBN 978-1-84832-100-7.
- Gardiner, Robert & Gray, Randal, eds. (1985). Conway's All the World's Fighting Ships 1906–1921. Annapolis, Maryland: Naval Institute Press. ISBN 0-85177-245-5.
- Massie, Robert K. (2004). Castles of Steel: Britain, Germany, and the Winning of the Great War at Sea. London: Johnathan Cape. ISBN 0-224-04092-8.
- Newbolt, Henry (1996). Naval Operations. History of the Great War Based on Official Documents. Vol. IV (reprint of the 1928 ed.). Nashville, Tennessee: Battery Press. ISBN 0-89839-253-5.
- Silverstone, Paul H. (1984). Directory of the World's Capital Ships. New York: Hippocrene Books. ISBN 0-88254-979-0.
- "Transcript: HMS DEVONSHIRE - June 1916 to December 1917, Grand Fleet, North America & West Indies Station, North Atlantic Convoys (Part 1 of 2)". Royal Navy Log Books of the World War 1 Era. Naval-History.net.
