= London and Glasgow Shipbuilding Company =

British shipbuilding firm

London and Glasgow Shipbuilding Company, also known as the London and Glasgow Engineering and Iron Shipbuilding Company, was a shipbuilding firm established in 1864 by a consortium of London bankers, including the Glasgow engineer James Rodger. They acquired the Middleton Yard in Govan in 1864, and soon acquired more land at Ron Bank in Govan which belonged to the Lochhead family. The old Lochhead land lay between Robert Napier and Sons "Old Yard" and the Middleton Yard allowing expansion to the west. London & Glasgow Engineering and Iron Shipbuilding Co. Ltd. also bought land at Lancefield on the northern side of the River Clyde and established a boiler workshop there.

The company was very successful at the Middleton Yard, building numerous ships, including many for the Cunard Line, such as the SS Carinthia and SS Sylvania, both launched in 1895. The company also built many ships for the Indo-China Steam Navigation Company, including SS Posang, SS Tai Sang, SS Lee Sang, SS Lien Shing, SS E Sang, SS Wo Sang, SS Tak Sang, and the 4000 ton SS Nam Sang, launched in February 1902. Many ships were also built for the Royal Navy at the Middleton Yard; amongst them was the 10,000 ton HMS Roxburgh, a first class armoured cruiser launched in January 1904. Another ship built for the Royal Navy was HMS Cumberland, a cruiser launched in December 1902. In 1910 London & Glasgow Engineering and Iron Shipbuilding Co. Ltd. acquired Napier's Govan East Yard (New Yard) from the owners William Beardmore and Co. Now as well as having the boiler shop at Lancefield and an engine works at Anderston Quay the London & Glasgow now owned the yards from Highland Lane (Note: A slightly staggered continuation of Stag St north of Clydebrae St, leading to the Kelvinhaugh Ferry) up to Mackie & Thompson at Napier's "Old Yard".

In 1912 Harland & Wolff Limited acquired both the Middleton and Govan East Yard from London & Glasgow Engineering and Iron Shipbuilding Co. Ltd. along with the Napier's "Old Yard" from Mackie & Thomson, creating one large yard which ran until 1962.

== List of ships built ==
- HMS Monmouth, Launched 13 November 1901, Completed 2 December 1903, sunk at the Battle of Coronel 1 November 1914.
- SS Osterley, launched 27 January 1909
- HMS Lynx, launched 20 March 1913, completed January 1914, mined and sunk 9 August 1915

Saikyō Maru
