= BL 7.5-inch Mk I naval gun =

Ordnance BL 7.5-inch gun Mk I
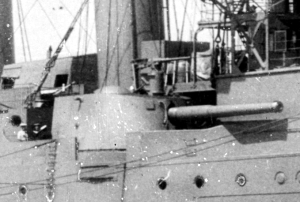
- Starboard wing gun on HMS Antrim
- Type: Naval gun
- Place of origin: United Kingdom

Service history
- In service: 1905–1922
- Used by: Royal Navy
- Wars: World War I

Production history
- Designer: Vickers
- Designed: circa. 1901
- Manufacturer: Vickers
- Produced: 1905
- No. built: 33

Specifications
- Mass: 13.7 long tons (13.9 t)
- Barrel length: 28 feet (8.534 m) bore (45 calibres)
- Shell: 200 pounds (90.7 kg)
- Calibre: 7.5 inches (191 mm)
- Breech: Welin breech block
- Elevation: -5° to +15°
- Rate of fire: 4-5 rpm
- Muzzle velocity: 2,700 ft/s (820 m/s)
- Effective firing range: 7.9 mi (12.7 km) at 15°

The BL 7.5-inch gun Mk I was a British 45-calibre, medium-velocity, naval gun which entered service with the Royal Navy in 1905.

== History ==
This gun was only mounted on Devonshire class cruisers commissioned in 1905, and was quickly superseded by the 50-calibre 7.5-inch Mk II gun.

== See also ==
- List of naval guns
