= Action of 14/15 February 1918 =

- Part of the First World War
- Map of the North Sea
| Date | 14/15 February 1918 |
| Location | Strait of Dover minefield, English Channel 51°00′N 01°30′E |
| Result | German victory |

Belligerents
| Royal Navy | Imperial German Navy |

Commanders and leaders
| Roger Keyes; A. E. Berry | Ludwig von Schröder; Oskar Heinecke |

Strength
| 58 drifters; 10 trawlers; 2 paddle minesweepers | 4 Destroyers; 4 Torpedo boats |

Casualties and losses
| 22 killed; 54 missing; 13 wounded; 1 Trawler sunk; 7 drifters sunk; 1 paddle minesweeper sunk; 6 drifters damaged | G 102 slightly damaged |

The action of 15 February 1918 was a naval engagement in the Strait of Dover of the English Channel during the First World War. The action took place between a Kaiserliche Marine (Imperial German Navy) destroyer flotilla and vessels of the Dover Patrol.

== Background ==
=== Dover Patrol ===
On 1 January 1918 Vice-Admiral Sir Reginald Bacon, the commander of the Dover Patrol since 13 April 1915, was sacked and replaced by Acting Vice-Admiral Sir Roger Keyes, due to differences between Bacon and a Channel Barrage Committee chaired by Keyes, to study the means of closing the Dover Strait to German U-boats and whether the existing barrage between South Calliper and the Flanders coast was capable of stopping anything. Bacon had proposed that a deep minefield be laid between the Varne Bank and Cap Gris-Nez that had been approved by the Admiralty in July 1917. The committee reported that the existing barrage was no obstacle to ships or U-boats and that its light buoys were useful to submarines navigating the straits.

=== Dover Barrage ===
In early October 1914, four British minelayers established a minefield of 1,064 mines from the Goodwin Sands to the Sandettie Bank, despite doubts of their utility,

....as our mine sinkers and mooring ropes are all useless, the results must be a failure.

— Captain Philip Dumas, Admiralty Assistant Director of Torpedoes

and before long many broke free of their moorings and drifted with the tides, 17 being detonated by British ships on 23 November. By the end of 1914 the Dover Patrol had sown 3,064 mines across the Dover Strait and off Zeebrugge that sank U-11 on 9 December and U-5 on 18 December 1914.

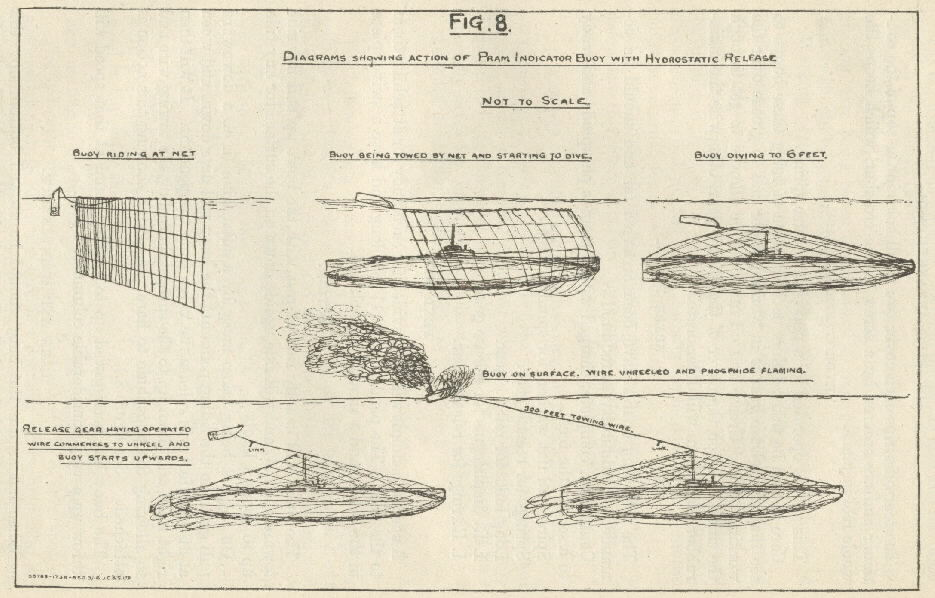
1917 diagram of an indicator net snaring a u-boat

The original mine barrier being a liability to all, a shorter mine and net barrier was planned with the use of indicator nets in lengths of up to 100 ft (30 m), of thin steel wire, held up with a jackstay and glass floats, intended to entangle submarines, then to be attacked with a lance bomb (an explosive at the end of a pole) while assistance arrived. The nets were laid by drifters, small fishing vessels, in divisions of about six vessels, guarded by armed patrol boats and ships. The new 17 nmi (31 km; 20 mi)-long indicator net barrier was laid in the Dover Strait in two days. The nets were combined with minefields set at several depths, backed up by patrols of destroyers. Rear-Admiral Horace Hood, the commander of the Dover Patrol had accumulated 140 assorted vessels for the task.

By the beginning of 1918 a deep mine barrage across the Dover Strait from Folkestone to Cape Gris-Nez on the French coast, had been completed. The Germans were ignorant of its existence because U-boats that came across it were destroyed. The minefield worked in combination with a squadron of Royal Navy trawlers and drifters who, upon sighting a submarine, would drive it into the minefield by means of gunfire and flares. Between 18 December 1917 and 9 February 1918, the U-boats SM UB-56 (mined 19 December 1917) SM U-109, SM UB-35 (depth charged 19 January 1918) and SM UB-38 mined on 8 February 1918, had been sunk by the Dover Patrol or in the Dover Strait.

== Prelude ==
=== German Plan ===
Over the winter of 1917−1918, the flotillas on the Flanders coast were restricted to defensive operations but for a few sorties, because of a lack of ships. The Germans had not attacked the straits since April 1917 and in the long winter nights, on 23 January 1918 a drifter, Clover Bank was attacked near the Thornton Bank by several German destroyers. The success of the Dover Patrol and the barrage in sinking U-boats led Korvettenkapitän Karl Bartenbach, to request assistance from Ludwig von Schröder the commander of MarineKorps Flandern, which was responsible for the defence of the Belgian coast, the northernmost part of the Western Front and air and sea operations against shipping in the English Channel and the southern North Sea. Schröder passed on the request to Admiral Reinhard Scheer, the commander of the High Seas Fleet as the MarineKorps lacked the ships for an offensive operation of sufficient magnitude. Scheer offered the II Destroyer Flotilla (Korvettenkapitän Oskar Heinecke) comprising eight 1,400 to 1,800 long tons (1,400 to 1,800 t) destroyers. The flotilla was to sail direct from the German Bight and assemble off the Haaks Lightship (west of Texel) at 5:30 p.m. to deny the British warning of an attack. The destroyers were only to enter Zeebrugge to refuel on the return journey and then return to the German Bight the same night.

=== Strait of Dover ===
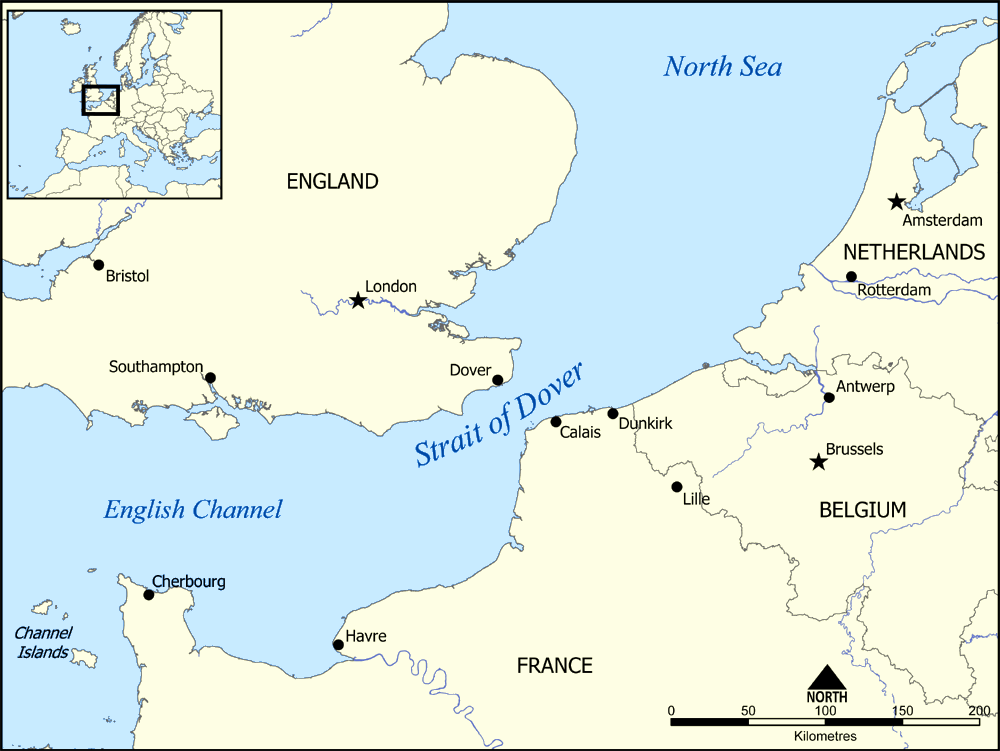
Map of the English Channel

The commander of the Dover Patrol, Roger Keyes, predicted that the attack on the drifter Clover Bank was the beginning of more German operations but nothing happened for three weeks. Keyes had retained the dispositions of the destroyer protective patrols of his predecessor, keeping a guard force at Dunkirk, protecting the port and the northern flank of the Allied armies in France and another flotilla in The Downs which was resting but kept at short notice to protects ships or reinforce the ships in the straits. Another destroyer division, comprising flotilla leaders and 4-inch gun destroyers, made up the East and West Barrage Patrols, the two groups taking turns.

The barrage patrols operated south of the original net barrage on parallel lines, about 5 nmi (9.3 km; 5.8 mi) long, the western line running north-east from 4 nmi (7.4 km; 4.6 mi) south of the South Goodwin light vessel, the eastern line from No. 9 buoy, part of a line of line of buoys from buoy No. 2 to buoy No. 16 between Folkestone and Cap Gris-Nez. Fifty-eight drifters were organised in nine divisions, usually of seven drifters apiece, each division commanded by a Lieutenant of the Royal Naval Reserve or the Royal Naval Volunteer Reserve guarded the minefield with indicator nets. For about 2.5 nmi (4.6 km; 2.9 mi) on either side of the deep minefield trawlers, paddle steamers and other small craft illuminated the area with searchlights and flares.

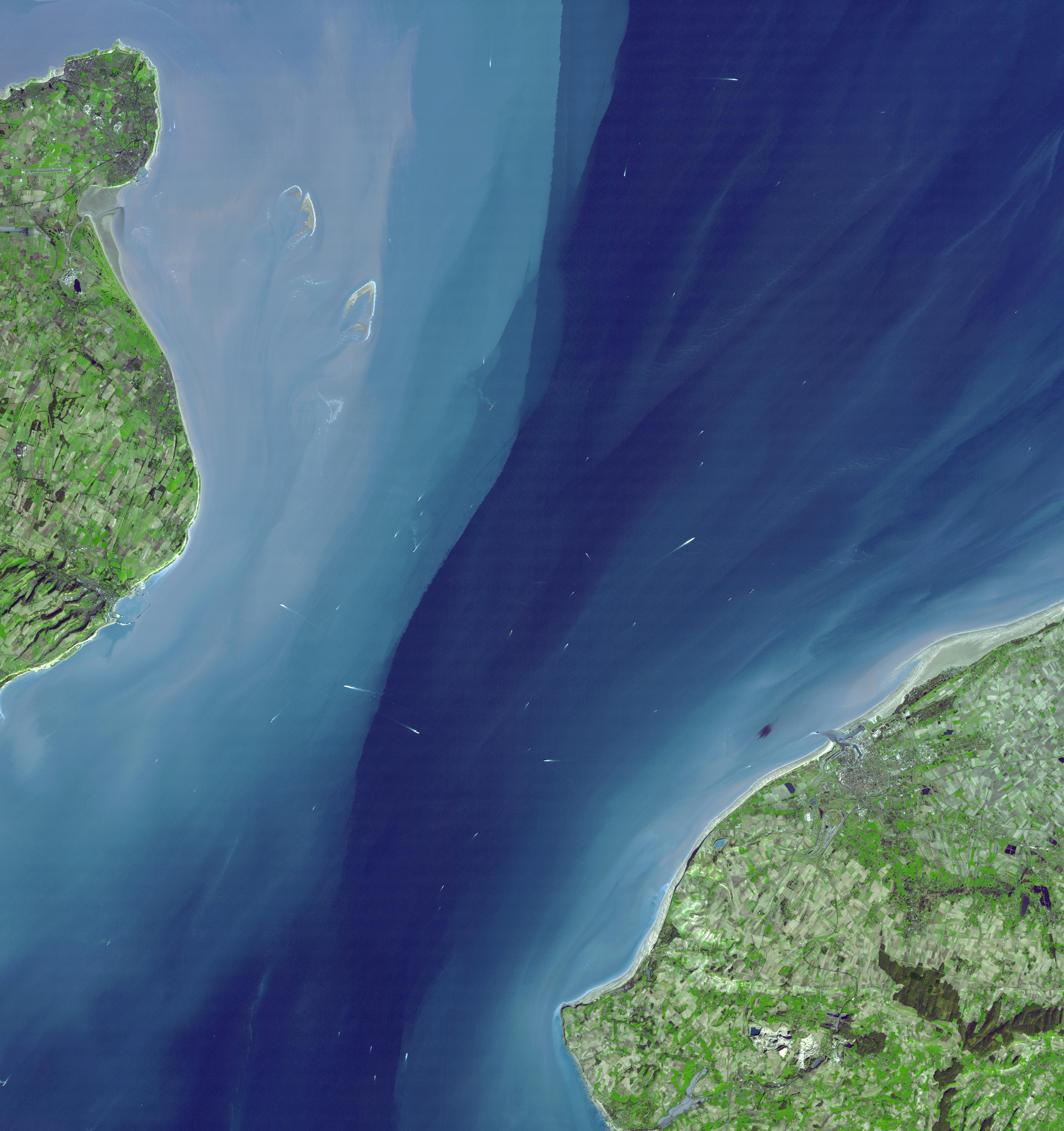
The Downs, off the English coast (left side)

On the night of 14/15 February 1918, the light cruiser HMS Attentive and the destroyers HMS Murray, Nugent and Crusader were resting in The Downs, ready to steam at short notice. The destroyers HMS Swift and Marksman were on the West Barrage Patrol and the destroyers HMS Termagant, Melpomene, Zubian and Amazon comprised the East Barrage Patrol. Six trawlers were north-east of the line of drifters, four trawlers were to the south-west and a third group was off Cap Gris-Nez. The trawlers illuminated the area with flares lit at random intervals. The paddle-minesweepers HMS Lingfield and Newbury patrolled between the south-eastern lightship of the Folkestone Gate and the Varne lightship, with four motor launches watching the passage between the gate and the land.

The drifters and trawlers were guarded by the monitor HMS M26 near the north-east Varne buoy, the destroyer HMS Racehorse between the Varne lightship and the Colbart Bank and with P.50 between light buoys 30 and 31. The French torpedo boats Torpilleur 344 and Torpilleur 350 patrolled the area between buoy 31 and Cap Gris-Nez. A searchlight at Folkestone swept the area between the port and the Folkestone Gate and other P-boats, when alerted by the drifters of a submarine, were to turn on their searchlights and make a slow sweep from north-west to south-east. The purpose of the Dover Barrage was to prevent German U-boats from using the strait but Keyes doubted that the barrage patrols could prevent a raid by German ships on the drifters and trawlers and gave orders for the drifters to scatter to the nearest shore if attacked, all sightings to be reported by green Very lights.

=== II Destroyer Flotilla ===
The eight destroyers of the flotilla were due to sail on 7 February but bad weather forced a postponement until 13 February. During the delay the planned route was cancelled because of British minelaying. The flotilla had to sail by the Frisian Islands, with the risk of being spotted from the Netherlands coast and their presence being reported to the British being reported. The fog on 13 February was a welcome screen and the II Destroyer Flotilla passed down the swept channel at Terschelling. When the flotilla arrived at the Haaks Lightship (off the Dutch coast) the attempt has to be delayed because of the persistent fog. To gain surprise the ships had to make a swift passage to the Channel but such poor visibility made this impossible. The flotilla sailed again on 14 February from Den Helder on a westerly course; once out of view from land Heinecke steered south. After night fell the destroyers sailed down the Dutch coast to the Schouven bank but at the Hook of Holland SMS G 104 had to turn back with engine-trouble. On reaching the Sandettie Bank Heinecke took the 4th Half-Flotilla to the north of the Colbart bank to attack the ships south of Dungeness and then attack the British vessels from Folkestone to the Varne bank. Kapitänleutnant Kolbe led the 3rd Half-Flotilla to the Cap Gris-Nez end of the Dover barrage and attack northwards. At 1:30 a.m. (12:30 a.m. GMT) the 4th Half-Flotilla was about 50 yd (46 m) from a paddle minesweeper when the destroyers opened fire.

== Action ==
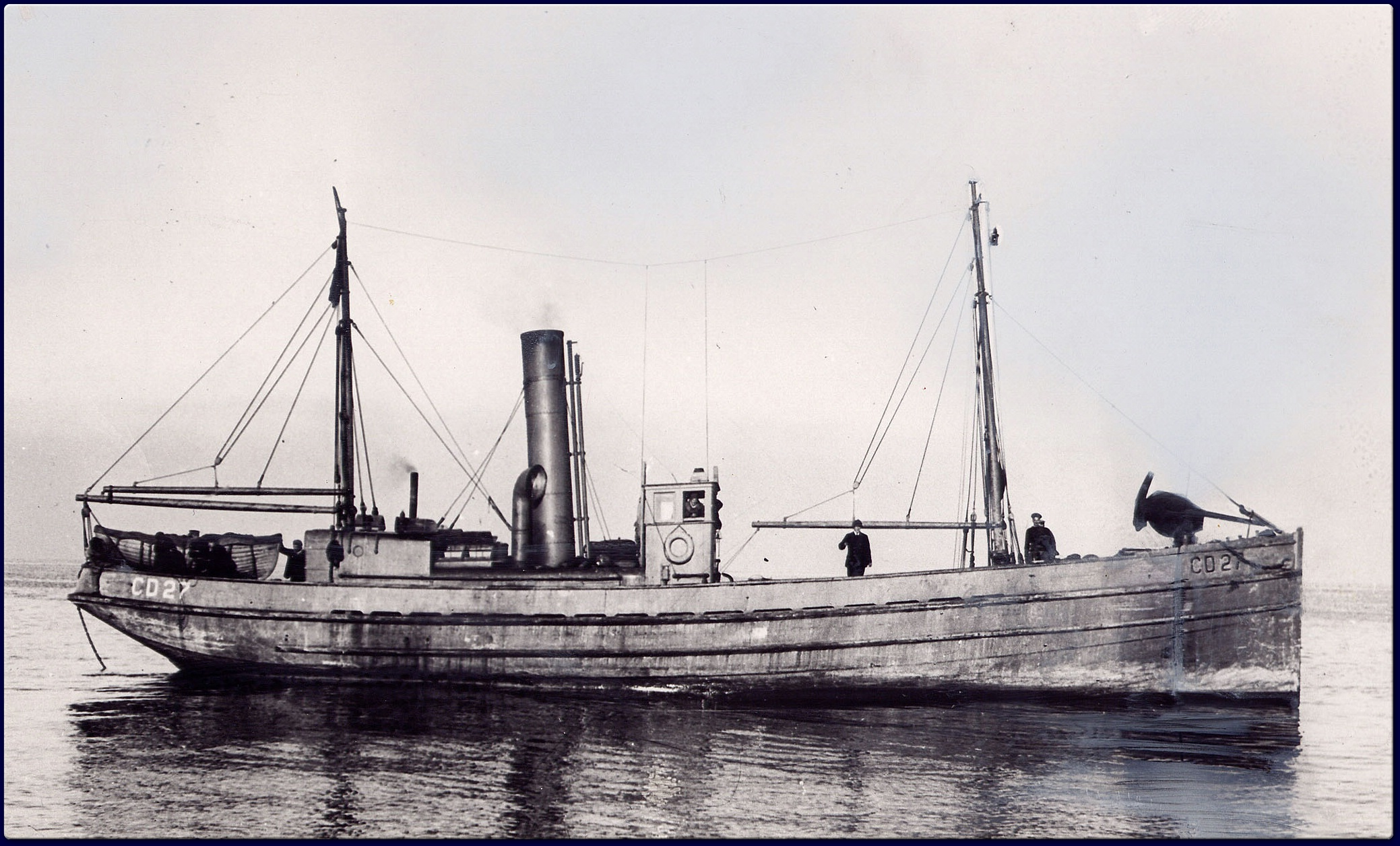
Canadian-built drifter CD-27 during the Great War

The night of 14/15 February was very dark and hazy, severely limiting visibility but between 11:30 pm and 12:00 a.m. the skipper of Shipmates, a drifter spotted a U-boat about 2 nmi (3.7 km; 2.3 mi) west south-west of No. 12 buoy heading eastwards towards the minefield. The skipper, Lieutenant W. Denson sent up the U-boat signal, red and white very lights and gave chase but the U-boat was lost on the dark. The minesweeper Lingfield and two motor launches saw the signal and investigated then returned to their stations. At 12:30 a.m. the minesweeper Newbury turned east south-east at the end of its beat at the Gate lightship towards the Varne buoy. Two destroyers loomed out of the darkness on a parallel course and fired on Newbury leaving it severely damaged and on fire. The captain, Lieutenant A. D. Thomson, let the ship drift north-east out of the minefield and dropped anchor.

Having not been given time to work up after a recent refit, Thomson could not find the green very lights to give the alert for surface attack. Most of the vessels in the strait had heard the gunfire but many mistook it for artillery-fire in Flanders or from the wrong direction. A signal station in Dover reported the sounds of gunfire from the south-west, soon confirmed by the station at Folkestone but having received a sighting report from Shipmates of a U-boat near no. 12 buoy assumed that this was the cause of the firing. Denson saw gun-flashes but before he could respond Shipmates and its drifter division was swept by searchlights and firing. Denson threw his confidential books overboard and followed standing orders to make for the shore until 1:00 a.m., when he was clear of the attackers. He saw several rockets go up but not having a standing order to repeat signals or able send a wireless message, having jettisoned his code-books, refrained from doing so, looking for his drifter division and returning to his station.

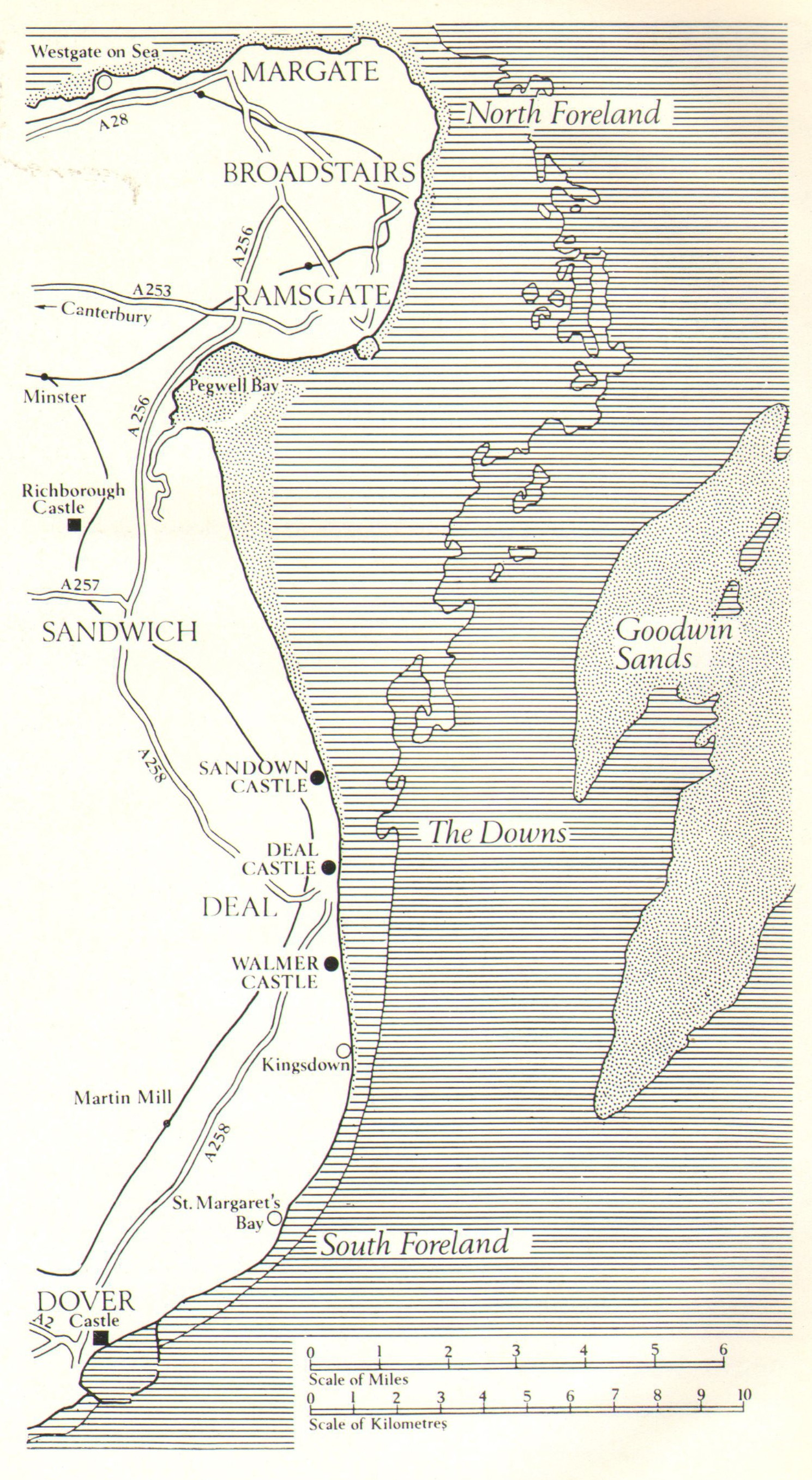
Map of the Downs

Other vessels heard the second outbreak of firing but when the commander of Lingfield headed to No 12 buoy and saw two ships illuminating with searchlights and firing he took them to be the monitor near the Varne lightship and a destroyer were firing on a U-boat, then reversed course as shells passed overhead. The skipper of the drifter Begonia II, between No. 13 and No. 14 buoys, heard firing from the north-east and north-west but did not speculate as to its cause. The captain of HMS Racecourse on a beat between Varne and the north-east part of Ridge Bank (the Colbart shoal) head firing to the north-east and took it to be an air raid on Dover.

The commander of ML 12, near the south-east gate lightship, heard firing and saw a burning ship to the south-west, then saw two destroyers to the north-east that bombarded ML 12 until it escaped in the dark, the captain convinced that the destroyers were British and had mistaken the ML for a U-boat. As ML 12 made its escape the captain spoke to the commander of the trawler Goeland II who was certain that the destroyers were German. The signal station at Dover contacted the Vice-Admiral Keyes Dover and reported that the firing was continuous but as no green Very lights had been seen it was still thought that a U-boat was being engaged.

At the other end of the mine barrier, at about 1:00 a.m. Torpilleur 344 and Torpilleur 350 near Les Quénocs, an underwater ridge, between Calais and Cap Gris-Nez, saw the trawler James Pond illuminating with a flare and three unusual destroyers heading south-west to disappear in the dark after about three minutes. After another ten minutes, the destroyers attacked James Pond and the southern drifter divisions of Cosmos and Clover Bank. As James Pond was hit its flares ignited and it caught fire. Clover Bank was quickly sunk as were Cosmos and Silver Queen. The few survivors reported

...sudden burst of fire, the hurricane of shells, the havoc in their ships and the small number of survivors that had got off in the boats and rowed away from the blazing wreckage.

Some of the drifter skippers that escaped fired green Very lights, seen by the skipper of Shipmates as he escaped from the first attack. The Very lights fired at the south (French) end of the barrier were not seen from the Dover signal station. Commander A. A. Mellin of the monitor M26, spotted them and realised their significance, steaming quickly to the south-west towards them but failed to report this to Dover. Soon afterwards the German destroyers attacked the drifter division of Jeannie Murray, the drifter being sunk with all hands, Violet May and Treasure being left burning. (Note: Only four men survived in Violet May, the two seriously wounded were manhandled into the ship's boat by the two unwounded men who later returned to the drifter, doused the fires and waited six hours for assistance to arrive.) At about 1:00 a.m. the Tessie drifter division was attacked near No. 12 buoy and that of Begonia near No. 14 buoy, chaos reigning when the firing began. Mellin, not far from Begonia received information which was misleading, having sailed south-west for 45 minutes, when he was able to question a drifter skipper who reported that he has seen green lights and head gunfire from the shore. Mellin then heard more gunfire to the north and north north-west and turned towards the Varne lightship but this was the end of the attack by the Germans on the Tessie drifter division.

== Aftermath ==
=== Analysis ===
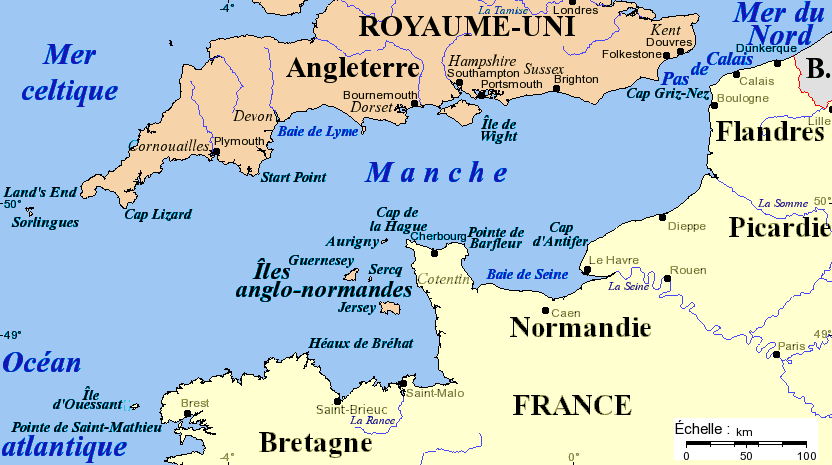
French map showing Cap Gris-Nez

In 1994, the American historian, Paul Halpern, wrote that the sinking of some ships burning flares was probably inevitable because they were sitting ducks. Occasional losses suffered by the barrage vessels might have been the cost of blocking the strait, which made the bravery of the sailors crewing the trawlers and drifters was all the more notable. The raid was the last by destroyers of the war, the Germans showing that they were unable permanently to disrupt the barrage which became more and more effective.

In 2014, the historian, Mark Karau, wrote that the ships on patrol appeared to have been lulled by the long pause in German operations. The destroyer attack took the British by surprise and threw them into the same confusion, as had the German raids in 1917. On the next night the III Flotilla and the Destroyer Flotilla attacked again, one flotilla moving down the English side of the strait and the other down the Calais side. The raiders found no ships and concluded that the illumination patrols had been stopped. The second sortie did not penetrate the strait as far as the night before and were said to have been unable to see the illuminations further west.

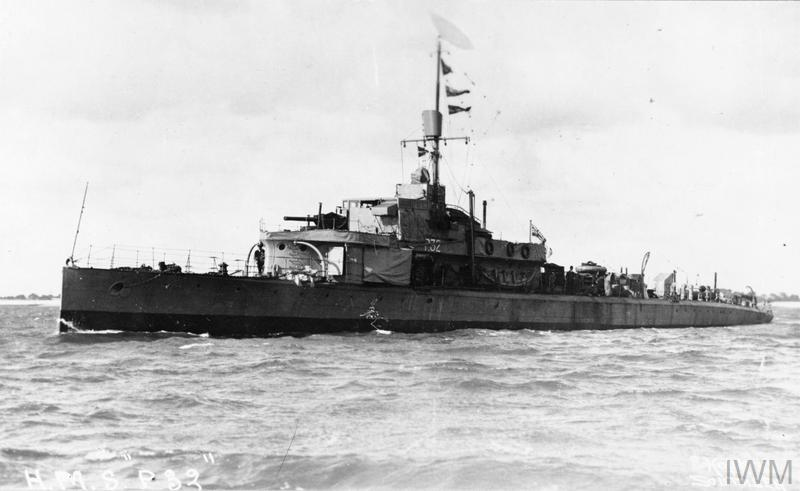
P-class sloop (P-boat) HMS P32 of the same class as HMS P50

The British claimed that the illumination patrols had continued as usual, yet in February and March, U-boats making passage through the barrage reported that it had been easier because of the lesser intensity of the illumination. Schröder reported that this would not last and that attacks must continue to force the British to abandon the barrier. The German failure to keep attacking made the victory transient as the barrage was soon restored. A 'brilliant success' became no more than a pinprick and Schröder did not request more support from the High Seas Fleet until the end of September. Karau suggested that the Germans had failed to recognise the opportunities that bases on the Flanders coast.

The British official historian, Henry Newbolt, wrote that Keyes sacked Commander A. A. Mellin of M-26, Commander M. R. Bernard the captain of Termagant and Lieutenant Adam Ferguson, the commander of Amazon, was sacked and also court-martialled for letting the German ships escape. Ferguson was given a severe reprimand a verdict that Keyes thought was too mild. In 2017, Steve Dunn wrote that perhaps as a boost to morale, Keyes arranged for the award of five Distinguished Service Crosses, two bars, thirteen Distinguished Service Medals and three Conspicuous Gallantry Medals to the reservists on the net barrage.

=== Casualties ===
In 1929, Archibald Hurd, the official historian of the Merchant Navy, wrote that 22 men were killed, 54 drowned and 13 men were wounded, an armed trawler and seven drifters were sunk, one paddle steamer and six drifters were damaged. The official historian of the Royal Navy, Henry Newbolt, wrote in Naval Operations (volume V, 1931) that 89 men were killed or missing, seven drifters and a trawler had been sunk and five drifters, a trawler and a paddle minesweeper had suffered severe damage. The historian, Mark Karau, wrote in 2014 that in his 1920 account, Reinhard Scheer had written that after the raid, the Germans claimed the destruction of 15 to 25 ships, the 4th Half-Flotilla sinking 13 patrol craft, a torpedo-boat and two motor launches, the 3rd Half-Flotilla 12 patrol craft and two motor launches. Scheer had written that the raid had ended the illumination patrols that had been causing U-boats so much trouble. Karau wrote that the real total was a trawler and seven drifters sunk and a trawler, five drifters and a paddle minesweeper severely damaged. The only damage suffered by the German destroyers occurred to SMS G102 that set off a mine on the return journey and put into Zeebrugge for repairs, returning to the fleet on 19 February. In 2017, the maritime historian, Steve Dunn, wrote that 89 men had been killed, seven drifters and a trawler had been sunk and that three drifters and a paddle steamer had been damaged. During the morning, the survivors and 36 of the dead that had been recovered were brought ashore at Dover wrapped in blankets and laid out at the Market Hall.

== German order of battle ==
II Zerstörer Flottille (Note: German destroyer-like vessels were officially termed große Torpedoboote (large torpedo boats) during the First World War.)
| Name | Flag | Class | Notes |
4th Half-Flotilla
| SMS B97 | Imperial German Navy | B 97-class destroyer | Flag, Korvettenkapitän Oskar Heinecke |
| SMS B109 | Imperial German Navy | B 97-class destroyer | |
| SMS B110 | Imperial German Navy | B 97-class destroyer | |
| SMS V100 | Imperial German Navy | B 97-class destroyer | Added to 4th Half-Flotilla as a reinforcement |
3rd Half-Flotilla
| SMS G101 | Imperial German Navy | G101-class torpedo boat | Flag, Kapitänleutnant Hans Kolbe |
| SMS G102 | Imperial German Navy | G101-class torpedo boat | Mined Zeebrugge, return voyage, slight damage |
| SMS G 103 | Imperial German Navy | G101-class torpedo boat | Engine trouble during raid |
| SMS G 104 | Imperial German Navy | G101-class torpedo boat | Turned back, engine trouble |

== British–French order of battle ==
=== Dover barrage ===
| Name | Flag | Type | Notes |
Dover barrage
| Drifters | Royal Navy | Naval drifter | 58 in nine drifter divisions |
| Trawlers | Royal Navy | Naval trawler | 10 illuminators in 2 groups |
| Motor launch | Royal Navy | Motor launch | 4 ML |
| HMS M26 | Royal Navy | M15-class monitor | In lieu of a 12-inch or 15-inch monitor, Captain sacked |
| HMS Racehorse | Royal Navy | Greyhound-class destroyer | |
| HMS P50 | Royal Navy | P-class sloop | Usually called P-boats |
Vessels (incomplete list)
| HMS Lingfield | Royal Navy | minesweeper | Damaged |
| HMS Newbury | Royal Navy | minesweeper | Damaged |
| Begonia II | Royal Navy | naval drifter | Between buoys 13 and 14 |
| Christina Craig | Royal Navy | naval drifter | Netlayer, sunk, all 10 crew lost |
| Chrysanthemum II | Royal Navy | naval drifter | Between buoys 13 and 14 |
| Clover Bank | Royal Navy | naval drifter | Netlayer, sunk, 13 crew, one survivor |
| Cosmos | Royal Navy | naval drifter | Netlayer, sunk, 11 of 14 crew lost |
| Golden Gain | Royal Navy | naval drifter | Netlayer, damaged, 1 killed |
| Golden Rule | Royal Navy | naval drifter | Netlayer, damaged, 3 killed |
| Jeannie Murray | Royal Navy | naval drifter | Netlayer sunk, all 15 crew lost |
| Shipmates | Royal Navy | naval drifter | Pursued U-boat |
| Silver Queen | Royal Navy | naval drifter | Netlayer, with Cosmos survivors, sunk, 9 casualties |
| Tessie | Royal Navy | naval drifter | Damaged |
| Treasure | Royal Navy | naval drifter | Damaged |
| Veracity | Royal Navy | naval drifter | Sunk |
| Violet May | Royal Navy | naval drifter | Netlayer, damaged, 4 survivors |
| W. Elliott | Royal Navy | naval drifter | Netlayer, damaged, sank on tow, 7 casualties |
| Goeland II | Royal Navy | naval trawler | Flare trawler |
| HMT James Pond | Royal Navy | naval trawler | Flare trawler, sunk, three crew lost |
| ML12 | Royal Navy | motor launch | Damaged |
East barrage patrol destroyers
| HMS Termagant | Royal Navy | Talisman-class destroyer | Captain sacked |
| HMS Melpomene | Royal Navy | Medea-class destroyer | |
| HMS Zubian | Royal Navy | Tribal-class destroyer | |
| HMS Amazon | Royal Navy | Tribal-class destroyer | Captain sacked, court-martialled and severely reprimanded |
West barrage patrol destroyers
| HMS Swift | Royal Navy | Destroyer leader | |
| HMS Marksman | Royal Navy | Marksman-class destroyer | |
Ships in The Downs
| HMS Attentive | Royal Navy | Adventure-class cruiser | Short notice reinforcement |
| HMS Murray | Royal Navy | M-class destroyer | Short notice reinforcement |
| HMS Nugent | Royal Navy | M-class destroyer | Short notice reinforcement |
| HMS Crusader | Royal Navy | Tribal-class destroyer | Short notice reinforcement |
Other vessels nearby
| HMS Syren | Royal Navy | Myrmidon-class destroyer | Reported burning wreck of Cosmos |
| Torpilleur 344 | French Navy | Type 38 m | le Groupe de Calais |
| Torpilleur 350 | French Navy | Type 38 m | le Groupe de Calais |

== See also ==
- Action of 11–12 December 1917
- Battle of Dover Strait (1916)
- Battle of Dover Strait (1917)
