= SMS G102 =

German Torpedo boat

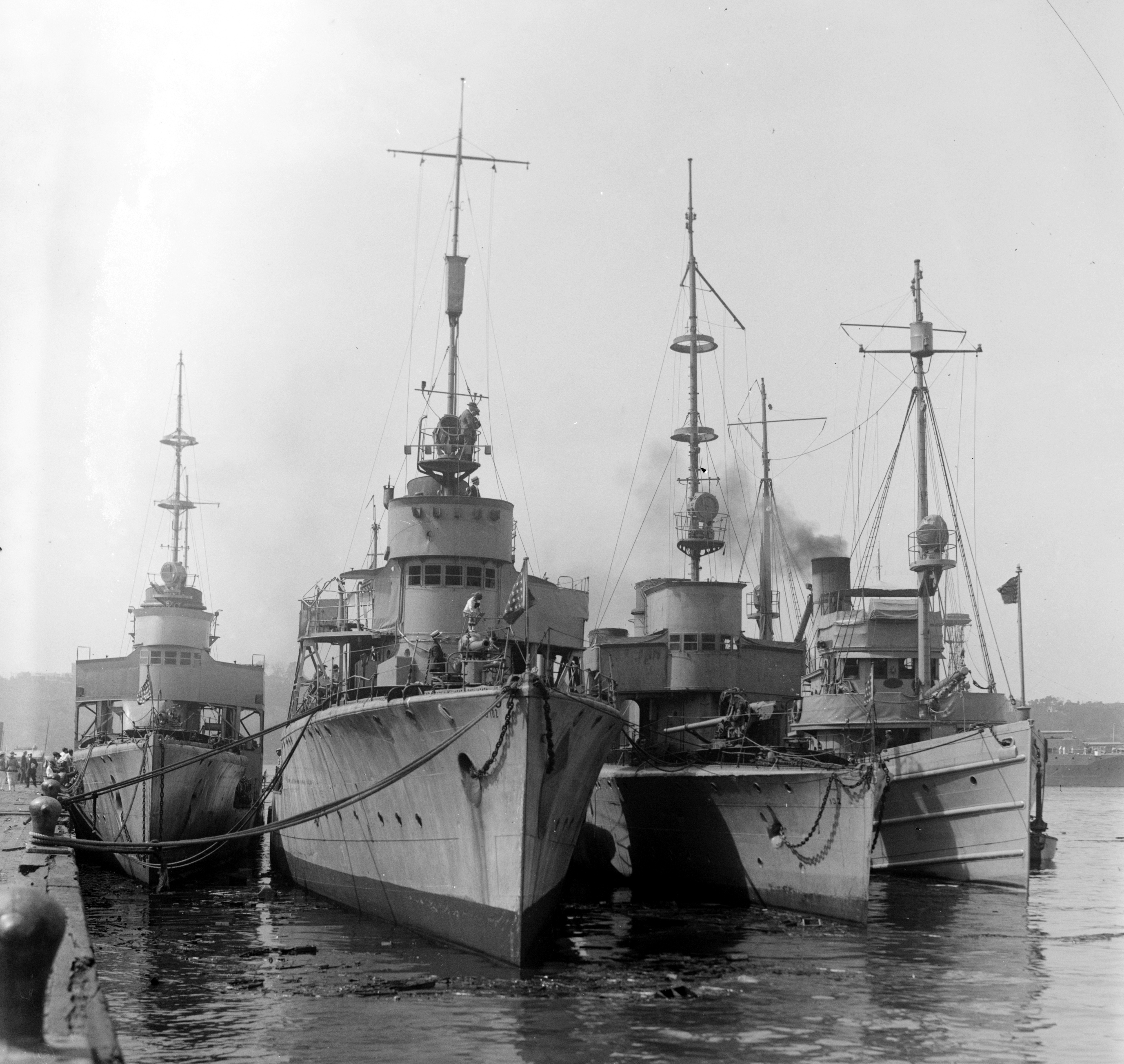
- Captured German torpedo boats anchored at New York. From left to right V43, G102 and S132.

History

German Empire
- Name: SMS G102
- Builder: Friedrich Krupp Germaniawerft
- Launched: 16 September 1914
- Completed: 8 April 1915
- In service: 8 April 1915
- Out of service: 13 July 1921
- Fate: Sunk as a target 13 July 1921

General characteristics
- Class & type: G101-class torpedo boat
- Tonnage: 1,116 t (1,098 long tons)
- Length: 95.3 m (312 ft 8 in)
- Beam: 9.47 m (31 ft 1 in)
- Depth: 3.84 m (12 ft 7 in)
- Installed power: 28,000 shp (21,000 kW)
- Propulsion: 2 x steam turbines
- Speed: 33.5 knots (62.0 km/h; 38.6 mph)
- Crew: 104
- Armament: 4 x 8.8 cm guns (later increased to 10.5 cm); 6 x 50 cm torpedo tubes; 24 mines

SMS G102 (Note: "SMS" stands for "Seiner Majestät Schiff" (transl. His Majesty's Ship)) (Note: The "G" in G102 denoted the shipbuilder who constructed her, in this case Germaniawerft.) was a G101-class large torpedo boat (Großes Torpedoboot) operated by Imperial German Navy during the First World War. The ship was ordered for the Argentine Navy from the German shipyard Germaniawerft as the San Luis, but was still under construction at the start of the war and was seized by Germany.

Entering service in April 1915, G102 served with the High Seas Fleet in the North Sea and English Channel, taking part in the Battle of Jutland in 1916. Despite being mined twice, the ship survived to the end of the war. G102 was interned at Scapa Flow after the war, and was present at the Scuttling of the German fleet on 21 June 1919, but did not sink, and was allocated to the United States under the Treaty of Versailles. The ship was sunk as a target by United States Army Air Service aircraft on 13 July 1921.

== Design ==
In 1912, the Argentine Navy ordered four large destroyers, (Santiago, San Luis, Santa Fé and Tucuman) from the German shipyard Germaniawerft as a replacement for British-built ships that had been built for Argentina but had been sold to Greece before completion (as the Aetos class).

The four new ships were 95.3 metres (312 ft 8 in) long overall and 94.0 metres (308 ft 5 in) between perpendiculars, with a beam of 9.47 metres (31 ft 1 in) and a draught of 3.84 metres (12 ft 7 in). They displaced 1,116 tonnes (1,098 long tons) normal and 1,734 tonnes (1,707 long tons) full load. Three boilers fed steam to two sets of steam turbines rated at 28,000 shaft horsepower (21,000 kW) to give a speed of 33.5 knots (62.0 km/h; 38.6 mph). It was originally planned to fit the ships with two cruising diesel engines rated at 1,800 metric horsepower (1,800 bhp; 1,300 kW), but these ended up not being fitted. The ships had three funnels. 500 t of oil was carried, giving a range of 2,420 nautical miles (4,480 km; 2,780 mi) at 20 knots (37 km/h; 23 mph). The Argentines planned to arm the ships with four 4-inch (102 mm) guns supplied by the American Bethlehem Steel and 21-inch (533 mm) torpedo tubes, but they were completed with four 8.8 cm SK L/45 naval guns in four single mounts. (Note: SK stands for Schnellfeuerkanone – Quick firing cannon in German) (Note: L/45 refers to the length of the gun's barrel. In this case the barrel was 45 calibres long.) Six 50 cm (19.7 in) torpedo tubes were fitted, and 24 mines could be carried. In mid 1916, they were rearmed with four 10.5 cm guns. These ships had a crew of 104 officers and ratings.

== Construction ==
The four ships were still under construction at Germaniawerft's Kiel shipyard on the outbreak of World War I, and the four ships were seized by Germany on 6 August 1914, with the class becoming the G101 class and San Luis renamed G102. G102 was launched on 16 September 1914 and completed on 8 April 1915.

== World War I career ==
On completion, G102 entered service with the 2nd Torpedo Boat Flotilla, together with her sister ships G101, G103 and G104 and the eight large torpedo boats of the B 97 class. The G101 and B97-classes were both significantly larger than contemporary German torpedo boats and so were often known as destroyers (Zerstörer) rather than torpedo boats. As G101-class torpedo boats were slower than those of the B97 class, ships of the two classes often operated as independent groups despite being part of the same flotilla, although German torpedo boats never operated singly.

On 16 August 1915, the 2nd Torpedo Flotilla was ordered to carry out a patrol off Horns Rev to search for a reported British submarine and armed trawlers. G102, together with G101 and B97, had to be sent back to port owing to mechanical problems. On the night of 16/17 August, the remaining five ships of the flotilla encountered a British minelaying force, with B98 torpedoing and badly damaging the British destroyer Mentor. From 16 to 18 November 1915, G102 was one of 18 torpedo boats that carried out a sweep in the Skagerrak against merchant shipping carrying cargoes for Britain. On 10 February 1916, G102 took part in a sortie by 25 torpedo boats of the 2nd, 6th and 9th Torpedo-boat Flotillas into the North Sea. The sortie led to an encounter between several German torpedo boats and British minesweepers off the Dogger Bank, which resulted in the British minesweeper Arabis being torpedoed and sunk by ships of the 2nd Flotilla.

G102, together with the rest of the 2nd Torpedo Boat Flotilla, was present at the Battle of Jutland on 31 May 1916, operating in support of the battlecruisers of I Scouting Group. G102, together with G101, G103 and G104, operated with the light cruiser Regensburg, initially operating at the starboard end of the torpedo boat screen ahead of the battlecruisers. Shortly after 19:00 CET (i.e. 18:00 GMT), G102 took part in a torpedo attack against battlecruisers of the British 3rd Battlecruiser Squadron, following on from attacks from the 6th and 12th Torpedo Boat Flotillas, but the ships of the first two flotillas blocked off G102's attack, preventing any torpedoes from being launched - only G104 of the G101-class ships managed to fire a torpedo, which missed its target. In the night of 31 May/1 June, the 2nd Torpedo Boat Flotilla was ordered to search for the British battle line to the north-east of the German force, but an encounter with British light cruisers caused them to divert from their course, and they passed well astern of the British battle fleet.

The 2nd Flotilla, including G102 was sent to reinforce the German naval forces based in Flanders, in early June 1916, arriving at Zeebrugge on 8 June. The primary duty of the flotilla was to protect the small A-class torpedo boats as they swept channels through British minefields to allow Flanders-based submarines to enter and exit port, while other duties included raids against merchant ships travelling between Britain and the Netherlands. On 12 July, G102 struck a mine, damaging her stern, and had to be towed back to port by B112. The torpedo boat was under repair for several months.

On 14 February 1918, the 2nd Flotilla, including G102, set out from Germany to attack the Dover Barrage, an anti-submarine barrier consisting of a minefield patrolled by trawlers and other small craft. In order to avoid alerting the British defences, the German force would attack without stopping at Flanders, refuelling on the return journey. The eight torpedo boats (Note: B97, V100, B109, B111, B112, G101, G102 and G103. A ninth torpedo boat, G104, had to abandon the operation owing to mechanical problems.) divided into two groups when they reached the Sandettie Bank early on 15 February, with one group, the fourth half-flotilla, to attack patrols on the north side of the Channel and the second, the third half-flotilla, consisting of V100, G101, G102 and G103, attacking from the south. On the approach to the barrage, the third half-flotilla encountered two French torpedo boats, but the French ships did not react, and the German force passed onwards. Both forces attacked the barrage successfully, claiming between 15 and 25 ships sunk, with actual British losses of one trawler and seven drifters sunk and one trawler, five drifters and the minesweeper Newbury badly damaged. The third half-flotilla encountered four patrolling British destroyers on its return journey, and was spotted and challenged by HMS Amazon. Despite receiving no response to the challenge, Amazon's commanding officer thought that the German ships were friendly, and again the German force were allowed to escape. On the approaches to Zeebrugge, G102 struck a mine, killing six of her crew, but was not badly damaged, and managed to reach port under her own power. After repair at Zeebrugge, G102 returned to Germany, rejoining the High Seas Fleet on 19 February. G102 remained part of the 2nd Torpedo Boat Flotilla at the end of the war in November 1918.

== Scuttling attempt at Scapa Flow and end ==
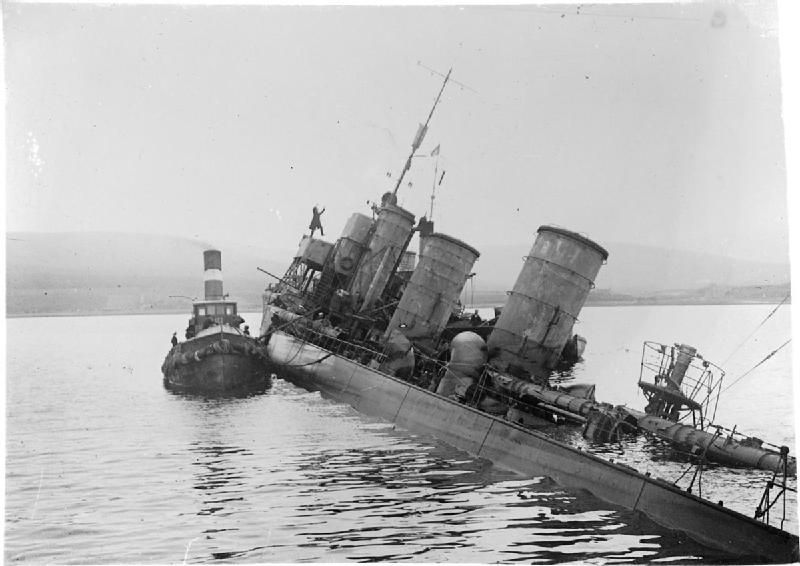
G102 beached at Scapa Flow

Following the end of the First World War, G102, along with much of Germany's remaining fleet, was interned at Scapa Flow in accordance with the terms of the Armistice of 11 November 1918. On 21 June 1919, the German fleet interned at Scapa scuttled itself, but several of the ships, including G102 did not sink, either being beached by British forces or drifting ashore when mooring cables were cut. Of the 74 interned vessels at Scapa Flow, 52 managed to scuttle themselves.

G102 was refloated and allocated to the United States under the Treaty of Versailles as a "Propaganda ship", which could be used for a short period of time for experimental purposes or as a target. The Americans ended up using G102 as a target for aircraft of the United States Army Air Service on 13 July 1921. G102 was anchored off Cape Henry, Virginia, and was first attacked at low level by S.E.5 fighters, dropping 25 lb (11 kg) bombs (25 of which hit the torpedo boat) and simulating strafing runs, and then by larger Martin Bombers, armed with 300 lb (140 kg) bombs, with G102 sinking after being hit by seven bombs.

== Gallery ==
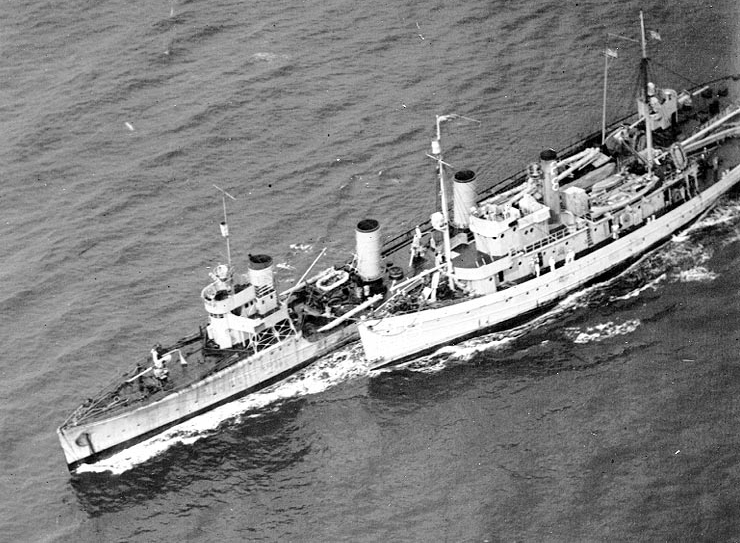
G102 being escorted to the United States by USS Falcon in 1920.

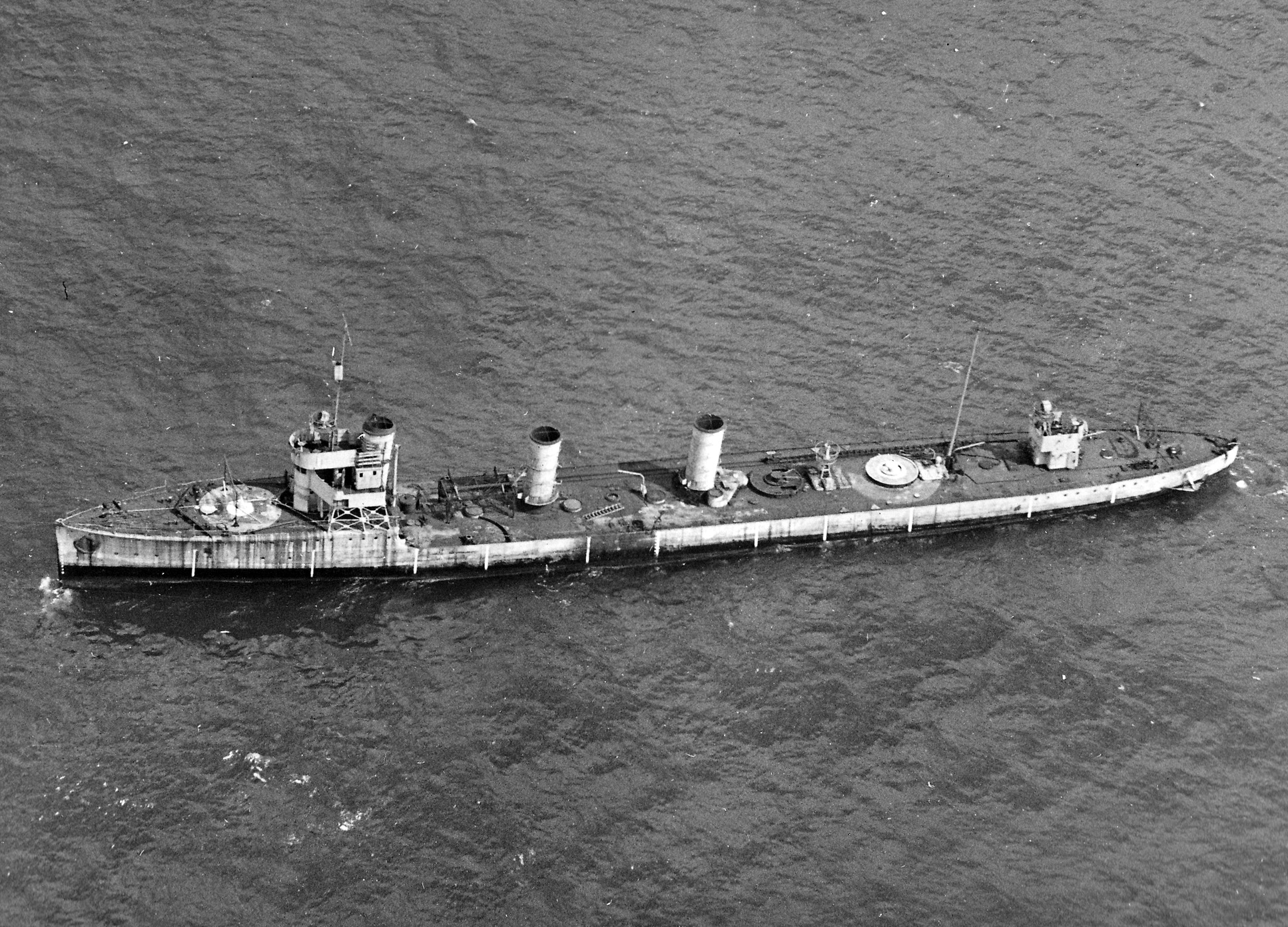
G102 as a target ship on 13 July 1921.

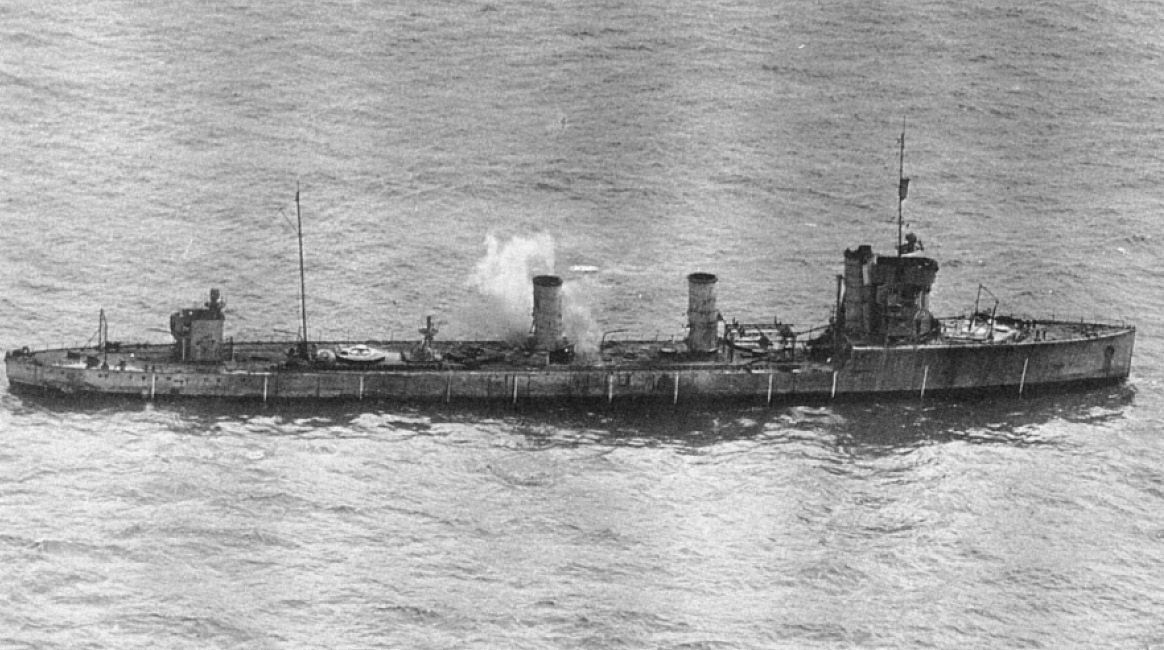
G102 being bombed on 13 July 1921.

== Bibliography ==
- Campbell, John (1998). Jutland: An Analysis of the Fighting. Lyons Press. ISBN 1-55821-759-2.
- Dodson, Aidan (2019). "Beyond the Kaiser: The IGN's Destroyers and Torpedo Boats After 1918". In Jordan, John (ed.). Warship 2019. Oxford, UK: Osprey Publishing. pp. 129–144. ISBN 978-1-4728-3595-6.
- Fock, Harald (1989). Z-Vor! Internationale Entwicklung und Kriegseinsätze von Zerstörern und Torpedobooten 1914 bis 1939 (in German). Herford, Germany: Koehlers Verlagsgesellschaft mBH. ISBN 3-7822-0207-4.
- Gardiner, Robert; Gray, Randal, eds. (1985). Conway's All The World's Fighting Ships 1906–1921. London: Conway Maritime Press. ISBN 0-85177-245-5.
- Goldrick, James (2018). After Jutland: The Naval War in Northern European Waters, June 1916–November 1918. Barnsley, UK: Seaforth Publishing. ISBN 978-1-5267-4298-8.
- Gröner, Erich (1983). Die deutschen Kriegsschiffe 1815–1945: Band 2: Torpedoboote, Zerstörer, Schnelleboote, Minensuchboote, Minenräumboote. Koblenz, Germany: Bernard & Graefe Verlag. ISBN 3-7637-4801-6.
- Groos, O. (1924). Der Krieg in der Nordsee: Vierter Band: Von Anfang Februar bis Ende Dezember 1915. Der Krieg zur See: 1914–1918 (in German). Berlin: Verlag von E. S. Mittler und Sohn – via National Library of Estonia.
- Karau, Mark K. (2014). The Naval Flank of the Western Front: The German MarineKorps Flandern 1914–1918. Barnsley, UK: Seaforth Publishing. ISBN 978-1-84832-231-8.
- Marder, Arthur J. (2014). From the Dreadnought to Scapa Flow: Volume V: Victory and Aftermath: 1918–1919. Barnsley: Seaforth Publishing. ISBN 978-1-84832-203-5.
- Maurer, Maurer (1987). Aviation in the U.S. Army, 1919–1939 (PDF). Washington, D.C.: Office of Air Force History, United States Air Force. ISBN 0-91279938-2. Archived from the original (PDF) on 21 April 2017.
- Monograph No. 30: Home Waters Part V: From July to October 1915 (PDF). Naval Staff Monographs (Historical). Vol. XIV. Naval Staff, Training and Staff Duties Division. 1926.
- Monograph No. 31: Home Waters Part VI: From October 1915 to May 1916 (PDF). Naval Staff Monographs (Historical). Vol. XV. Naval Staff, Training and Staff Duties Division. 1926.
- Ruge, F. (1972). Warship Profile 27: SM Torpedo Boat B110. Profile Publications.
- Tarrant, V. E. (1997). Jutland: The German Perspective. London: Arms & Armour Press. ISBN 1-85409-442-4.
