= G102 =

G102 or G.102 may refer to:

- China National Highway 102
- R-1820-G102, a model of the Wright R-1820 Cyclone aircraft engine
- SMS G102, a German torpedo boat was sunk as a target by U.S. Army planes in 1921
- Grob G102 Astir, a single-seat glassfibre Standard Class sailplane
- Martinsyde G.102, a British First World War fighter bomber aircraft
