= HMS Pellew (1916) =

British M-Class destroyer, WW1

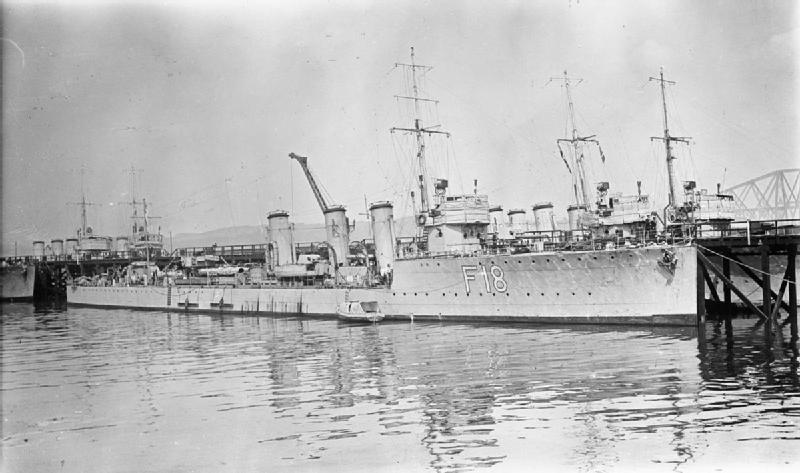
- Sister ship HMS Paladin

History

United Kingdom
- Name: HMS Pellew
- Namesake: Edward Pellew, 1st Viscount Exmouth
- Ordered: May 1915
- Builder: William Beardmore and Company, Dalmuir
- Yard number: 538
- Laid down: 28 June 1915
- Launched: 18 April 1916
- Completed: 30 June 1916
- Out of service: 9 May 1921
- Fate: Sold to be broken up

General characteristics
- Class & type: Admiralty M-class destroyer
- Displacement: 994 long tons (1,010 t) normal; 1,250 long tons (1,270 t) full load
- Length: 273 ft 6 in (83.4 m)
- Beam: 26 ft 9 in (8.2 m)
- Draught: 8 ft 5 in (2.57 m)
- Propulsion: 3 Yarrow boilers; 2 Brown-Curtis steam turbines, 25,000 shp (19,000 kW)
- Speed: 34 knots (63 km/h; 39 mph)
- Range: 3,450 nmi (6,390 km; 3,970 mi) at 15 kn (28 km/h; 17 mph)
- Complement: 76
- Armament: 3 × QF 4 in (102 mm) Mark IV guns (3×1); 1 × single 2-pounder (40 mm) "pom-pom" Mk. II anti-aircraft gun (1×1); 4 × 21 in (533 mm) torpedo tubes (2×2)

HMS Pellew was a Admiralty M-class destroyer which served with the Royal Navy during the First World War. The M class were an improvement on the preceding L class, capable of higher speed. Launched on 18 April 1916, the vessel served with the Grand Fleet escorting convoys. The vessel was part of an unsuccessful attempt by the navy to trap the German submarines that had taken such a heavy toll on merchant shipping in December 1917. The action involved an eight-ship convoy consisting of four merchant vessels escorted by two armed trawlers and the sister ships Pellew and Partridge. Instead of submarines, four German destroyers attacked, sinking all but one member of the convoy and disappearing before the light cruisers which were to be the spring in the trap could arrive. Pellew, the sole survivor, took refuge in a Norwegian fjord. After the armistice that ended the war, the destroyer was placed in reserve and subsequently sold to be broken up on 9 May 1921.

== Design and development ==
Pellew was one of sixteen Admiralty M-class destroyers ordered by the British Admiralty in May 1915 as part of the Fifth War Construction Programme. The M-class was an improved version of the earlier L-class destroyer destroyers, designed to reach a higher speed in order to counter rumoured German fast destroyers, although it transpired these vessels did not exist.

The destroyer was 273 feet 6 inches (83.36 m) long overall, with a beam of 26 feet 9 inches (8.15 m) and a draught of 8 feet 5 inches (2.57 m). Displacement was 994 long tons (1,010 t) normal and 1,250 long tons (1,270 t) full load. Power was provided by three Yarrow boilers feeding two Brown-Curtis steam turbines rated at 25,000 shaft horsepower (19,000 kW) and driving two shafts, to give a design speed of 34 knots (63 km/h; 39 mph). Three funnels were fitted. 296 long tons (301 t) of oil were carried, giving a design range of 3,450 nautical miles (6,390 km; 3,970 mi) at 15 knots (28 km/h; 17 mph).

Armament consisted of three 4-inch (102 mm) Mk IV QF guns on the ship's centreline, with one on the forecastle, one aft on a raised platform and one between the middle and aft funnels. A single 2-pounder (40 mm) pom-pom anti-aircraft gun was carried, while torpedo armament consisted of two twin mounts for 21 in (533 mm) torpedoes. The ship had a complement of 76 officers and ratings.

== Construction and career ==
Pellew was laid down by William Beardmore and Company of Dalmuir on 28 June 1915 with the yard number 538, launched on 18 May the following year and completed on 30 June. The vessel was the first to be named after the naval officer Admiral Sir Edward Pellew, 1st Viscount Exmouth. The vessel was deployed as part of the Grand Fleet, joining the newly-formed Fourteenth Destroyer Flotilla.

Pellew spent the war escorting convoys, primarily between Britain and Scandinavia. These were often subject to attacks from German submarines. For example. on 16 June 1917 the destroyer was off the coast of Norway escorting a convoy of vessels, including the Danish merchant ship Gunhild, which was sunk by SM U-100 the following day. On 11 December, while escorting a convoy from Lerwick to Marsden as part of lure to attract German submarines so that they could be attacked by larger light cruisers. However, when German naval vessels appeared to attack the convoy, the force consisted of four destroyers rather than submarines. At the head of the convoy when these attackers were sighted, Pellew ordered the convoy to scatter. The destroyer, along with sister ship Partridge engaged the German ships, receiving multiple hits. Partridge was sunk, while Pellew was struck in the engine room and the mechanism to launch the aft torpedoes, which was disabled. The ship was only able to launch a single torpedo before the German vessels turned and targeted the convoy, sinking all six merchant ships and the two armed trawlers that accompanied them. Pellew struggled to Selbjørnsfjorden, taking refuge with the few survivors from the convoy until the arrival of the 1st Light Cruiser Squadron which accompanied the destroyer back to Scapa Flow, arriving on 15 December. The action led to a reappraisal of the support needed by convoy escorts.

After the armistice, the Royal Navy returned to a peacetime level of mobilisation. On 17 October 1919, the destroyer was reduced and placed in the Reserve Fleet. Pellew was sold to be broken up by Thos W Ward on 9 May 1921, arriving at Briton Ferry on 5 January 1923.

== Pennant numbers ==
| Pennant number | Date |
|---|---|
| G64 | September 1915 |
| H75 | January 1918 |
| H98 | November 1918 |
