= Bovbjerg =

- Coastal hill
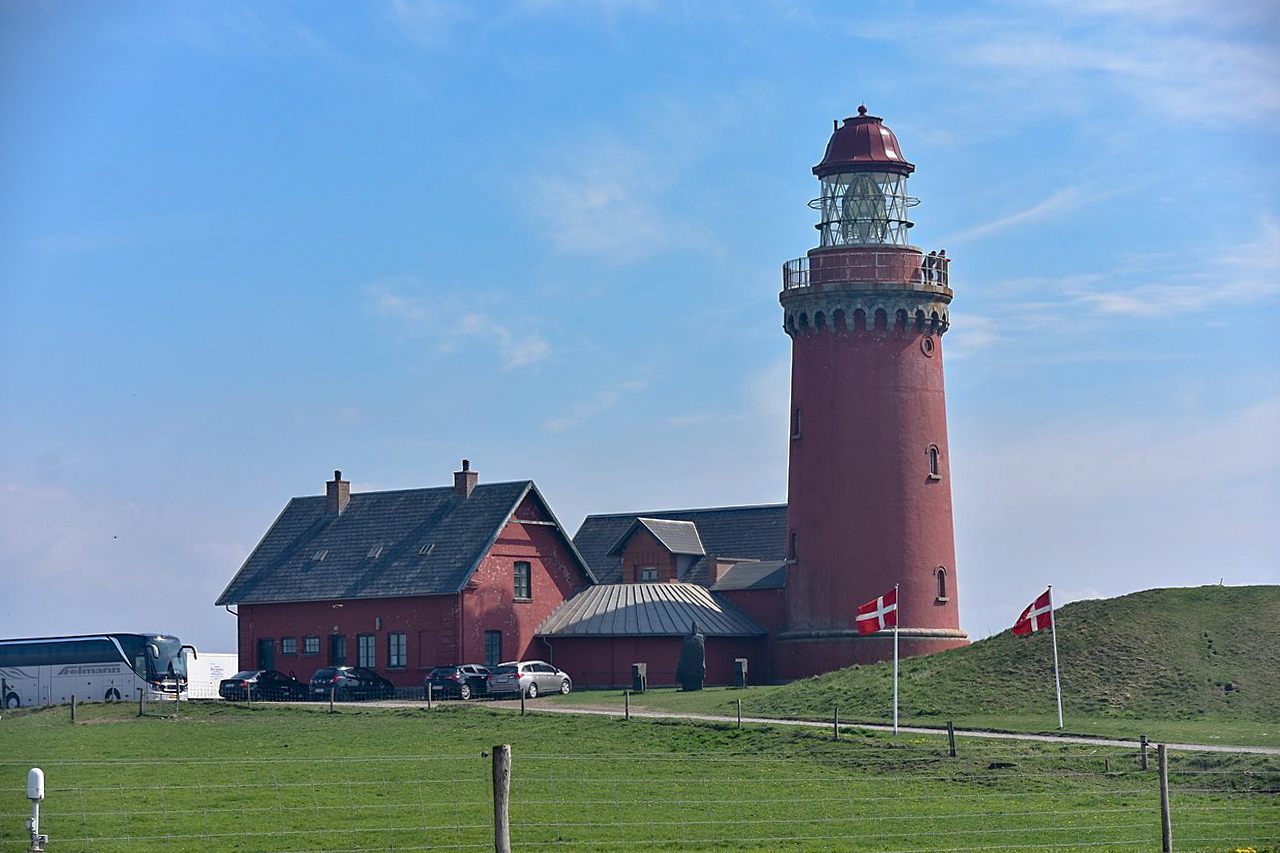
- Bovbjerg lighthouse
- Interactive map of Bovbjerg
- Coordinates: 56.514°N 8.126°E
- Location: Lemvig Municipality, Region Midtjylland, Denmark
- Elevation: 41 m (135 ft)

Bovbjerg is an up to 41 meter high coastal hill south of the village Ferring in Western Jutland, Denmark. It is known for its lighthouse, Bovbjerg Fyr, and its beach, Bovbjerg Strand.

Bovbjerg is located in Lemvig Municipality, Region Midtjylland.
