= HMS P32 =

Two ships of the Royal Navy have been named HMS P32.

- HMS P32 (1916), a P-class patrol boat launched in 1916 and sold in 1921.
- HMS P32 (1940), a U-class submarine launched in December 1940 and sunk in August 1941.
