= HMS M26 =

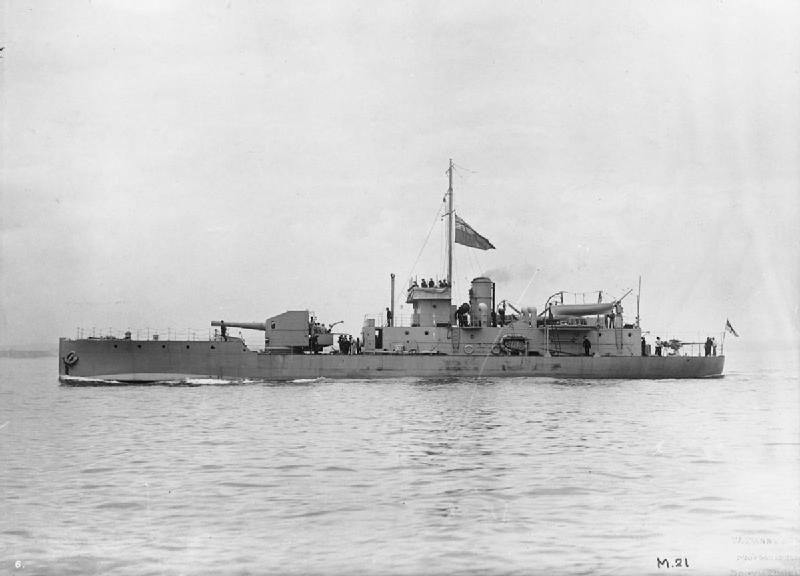
- Photograph of monitor HMS M21 from the same class

History

United Kingdom
- Name: HMS M26
- Builder: Sir Raylton Dixon & Co.
- Laid down: 1 March 1915
- Launched: 24 August 1915
- Fate: Sold 29 January 1920

General characteristics
- Class & type: M15 class monitor
- Displacement: 540 tons
- Length: 177 ft 3 in (54.03 m)
- Beam: 31 ft (9.4 m)
- Draught: 6 ft 9 in (2.06 m)
- Propulsion: 4 shaft; Bolinder 2 cylinder semi-diesel; 480 hp
- Speed: 11 knots
- Complement: 69
- Armament: As built; 1 × BL 9.2-inch Mk VI gun; 1 × 12-pdr (76 mm) QF Mk 1 gun; 1 × 6-pdr (57 mm) QF MK 1 AA gun; 1918; 1 × BL 7.5-inch (190.5 mm) Mk III 50-caliber gun; 1 × QF 3-inch (76.20 mm) AA gun; 1 × 12-pdr (76 mm) QF Mk 1 gun; 2 × QF 2-pounder Mark II

HMS M26 was a First World War Royal Navy M15-class monitor.

== Design ==
Intended as a shore bombardment vessel, M26's primary armament was a single 9.2 inch Mk VI gun removed from the Edgar-class cruiser HMS Edgar. In addition to her 9.2 inch gun she also possessed one 12 pounder and one six pound anti-aircraft gun. She was equipped with a four shaft Bolinder two cylinder semi-diesel engine with 480 horse power that allowed a top speed of eleven knots. The monitor's crew consisted of sixty nine officers and men.

== Construction ==
HMS M26 ordered in March, 1915, as part of the War Emergency Programme of ship construction. She was laid down at the Sir Raylton Dixon & Co. Ltd shipyard at Govan in March 1915, launched on 24 August 1915, and completed in October 1915.

== World War 1 ==
M26 served with the Dover Patrol from November 1915 to December 1918. In early 1916, M26 had her main 9.2 in gun removed, as it was required for artillery use on the Western Front, and a BL 7.5-inch (190.5 mm) Mk III 50-caliber gun was fitted in lieu.

== Disposal ==
M26 was sold on 29 January 1920 for conversion to a mercantile oil tanker and renamed 'Doewa'.
