= HMS Newbury (1916) =

Minesweeper of the Royal Navy

History

United Kingdom
- Name: HMS Newbury
- Namesake: Newbury Racecourse
- Builder: Inglis, Glasgow
- Launched: 3 July 1916
- Completed: 9 September 1916
- Fate: Sold March 1922

General characteristics
- Class & type: Racecourse-class minesweeper
- Displacement: 810 long tons (820 t) normal
- Length: 245 ft 9 in (74.90 m) oa
- Beam: 29 ft 0 in (8.84 m)
- Draught: 7 ft 0 in (2.13 m)
- Installed power: 1,500 ihp (1,100 kW)
- Propulsion: Diagonal compound steam engine; 2 paddles
- Speed: 14.5 kn (16.7 mph; 26.9 km/h)
- Complement: 50
- Armament: 2 × 6-pounder (57 mm) guns; 2 × 2-pounder (40 mm) guns

HMS Newbury was a Racecourse-class (or Ascot-class) minesweeper of the British Royal Navy, built in 1916 by A. & J. Inglis. The Racecourse-class were paddle-steamers, intended for operations in shallow coastal waters.

Newbury survived the First World War, and was sold for scrap in 1922.

== Design ==
Following the outbreak of the First World War, the Royal Navy supplemented its very small force of minesweepers with civilian ships purchased or chartered, particularly trawlers or paddle steamers. The paddle steamers proved successful, with their shallow draught reducing the hazards from mines, and it was decided to build a class of dedicated paddle minesweepers, the Racecourse- or Ascot-class, with 24 ships ordered between September 1915 and January 1916.

The ships were 245 feet 9 inches (74.90 m) long overall, and 235 feet 0 inches (71.63 m) between perpendiculars with a beam of 29 feet 0 inches (8.84 m) (and 58 feet 0 inches (17.68 m) over the paddles) and a draught of 7 feet 0 inches (2.13 m). Displacement was 810 long tons (820 t) normal. An inclined two-cylinder compound steam engine fed by cylindrical boilers drove the paddles. The machinery was rated at 1,500 indicated horsepower (1,100 kW) giving a speed of 14.5 knots (16.7 mph; 26.9 km/h). Armament consisted of two six-pounder (57mm) guns and two 2-pounder (40mm) anti-aircraft autocannons. The ships had a crew of 50 officers and men.

== Service ==
Newbury was laid down at A. & J. Inglis's Pointhouse, Glasgow shipyard as Yard number 313. She was launched on 3 July 1916, and was completed on 9 September that year.

Newbury served with the Auxiliary Patrol during the war. On the night of 14/15 February 1918, Newbury was in the Dover Strait when German destroyers launched an attack on the Dover Barrage. Newbury was the first British ship attacked by the Germans, who set Newbury ablaze with their gunfire before moving on, sinking seven drifters and one trawler in total. Newbury was towed back to port by sister ship Lingfield. Twelve of Newbury's crew were killed.

Post-war, Newbury was employed on mine clearance duties. She was sold for scrap to the shipbreaker Ward, at their Inverkeithing works, in March 1922.

== Bibliography ==
- Dittmar, F. J.; Colledge, J. J. (1972). British Warships 1914–1919. Shepperton, UK: Ian Allan. ISBN 0-7110-0380-7.
- Gardiner, Robert; Gray, Randal, eds. (1985). Conway's All The World's Fighting Ships 1906–1921. London: Conway Maritime Press. ISBN 0-85177-245-5.
- Karau, Mark D. (2014). The Naval Flank of the Western Front: The German MarineKorps Flandern 1914–1918. Barnsley, UK: Seaforth Publishing. ISBN 978-1-84832-231-8.
- Moore, John (1990). Jane's Fighting Ships of World War I. London: Studio Editions. ISBN 1-85170-378-0.
