= G101-class torpedo boat =

Argentine Navy destroyer

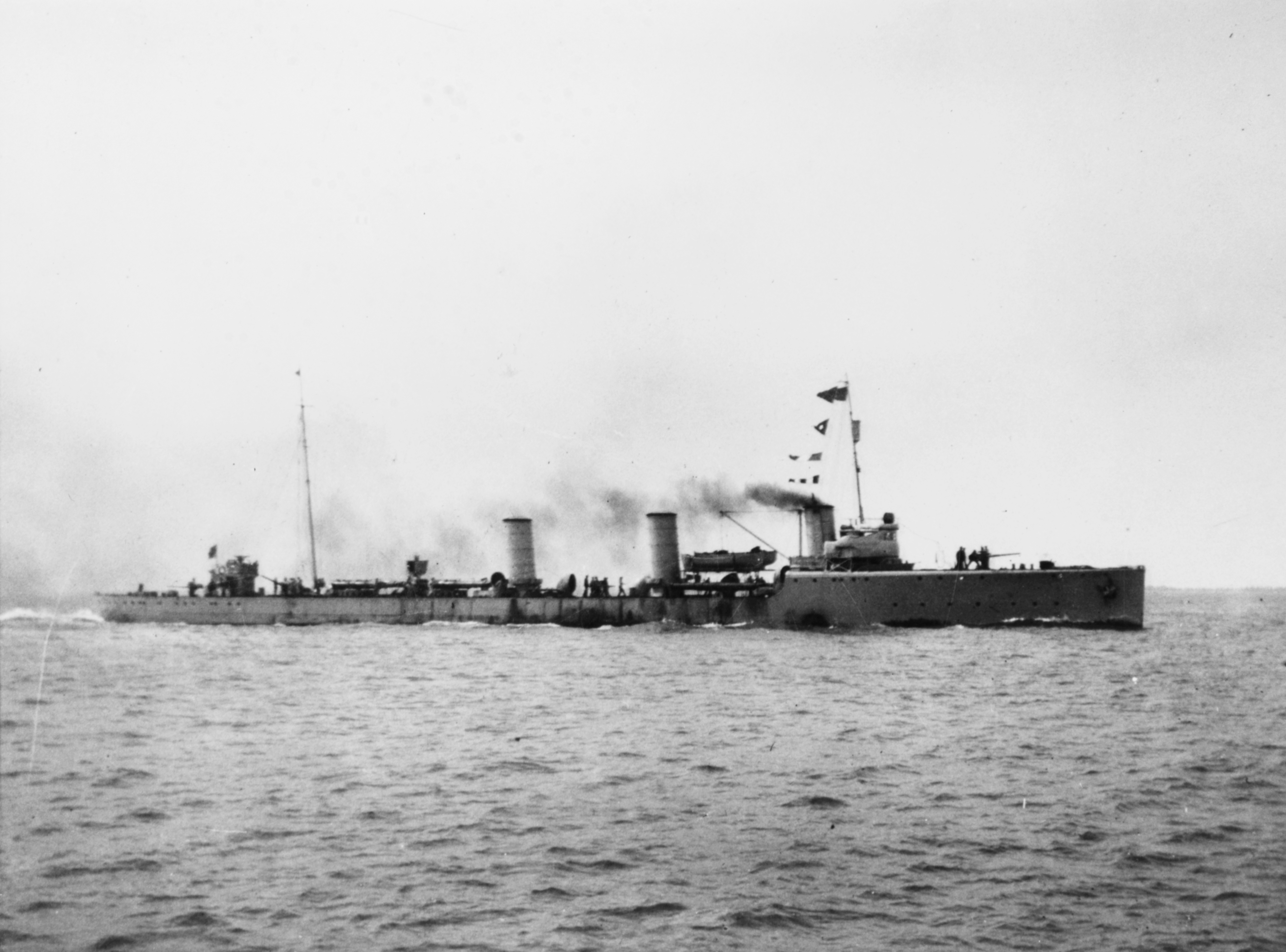
- A G101-class destroyer underway circa 1916

Class overview
- Builders: Germaniawerft, Kiel
- Operators: Imperial German Navy
- Built: 1912–1915
- In commission: 1915–1918
- Completed: 4
- Lost: 4

General characteristics
- Type: Destroyer
- Displacement: 1,734 t (1,707 long tons) deep load
- Length: 95.3 m (312 ft 8 in) oa
- Beam: 9.47 m (31 ft 1 in)
- Draught: 3.84 m (12 ft 7 in)
- Installed power: 28,000 PS (28,000 shp; 21,000 kW)
- Propulsion: 3 oil-fired Navy boilers; Steam turbines; 2 shafts
- Speed: 33.5 knots (62.0 km/h; 38.6 mph)
- Range: 2,420 nmi (4,480 km; 2,780 mi) at 20 knots (37 km/h; 23 mph)
- Complement: 104
- Armament: 4 × 8.8 cm SK L/45 naval guns; 6 × 500 mm (19.7 in) torpedo tubes

The G101 class was a class of four large torpedo boats (sometimes rated as destroyers) that were ordered for the Argentine Navy from the German shipyard Germaniawerft in 1912. They were still building on the outbreak of the First World War in August 1914 when they were seized on behalf of the Kaiserliche Marine (Imperial German Navy). All four ships completed in 1915 and serving through the rest of the war, with three ships present at the Battle of Jutland in 1916. Three ships were scuttled at Scapa Flow in 1919 and one sunk as a target by American aircraft in 1921.

== Design ==
In 1910, the Argentine Navy placed orders for twelve large destroyers with the orders split between the British shipyard Cammell Laird (four ships), the French shipyard Ateliers et Chantiers de Bretagne (four ships) and the German shipyards Germaniawerft and Schichau-Werke (two each). The four German-built ships were completed in 1912 and delivered that year, but the four British-built ships were purchased by Greece in October 1912 because of the First Balkan War, becoming the Aetos class. To replace these four ships, Argentina ordered four more ships from Germaniawerft in 1912. The outbreak of the First World War led to the four ships, which had not yet been launched, being seized by Germany on 6 August 1914 and being completed for the Kaiserliche Marine. The four French-built ships were also still building on the outbreak of the First World War and served with the French Navy as the Aventurier class.

The four new ships were 95.3 metres (312 ft 8 in) long overall and 94.0 metres (308 ft 5 in) between perpendiculars, with a beam of 9.47 metres (31 ft 1 in) and a draught of 3.84 metres (12 ft 7 in). They displaced 1,116 tonnes (1,098 long tons) normal and 1,734 tonnes (1,707 long tons) full load. Three boilers fed steam to two sets of steam turbines rated at 28,000 shaft horsepower (21,000 kW) to give a speed of 33.5 knots (62.0 km/h; 38.6 mph). It was originally planned to fit the ships with two cruising diesel engines rated at 1,800 metric horsepower (1,800 bhp; 1,300 kW), but these ended up not being fitted. The ships had three funnels. 500 t of oil was carried, giving a range of 2,420 nautical miles (4,480 km; 2,780 mi) at 20 knots (37 km/h; 23 mph).

The Argentines planned to arm the ships with four 4-inch (102 mm) guns supplied by the American Bethlehem Steel and 21-inch (533 mm) torpedo tubes, but they were completed with four 8.8 cm SK L/45 naval guns in four single mounts. (Note: SK stands for Schnellfeuerkanone – Quick firing cannon in German) (Note: L/45 refers to the length of the gun's barrel. In this case the barrel was 45 calibres long.) These guns could fire a 9 kg (20 lb) high explosive shell a distance of 11,790 m (12,890 yd) at a rate of 15 rounds per minute. 120 rounds per gun were carried. Six 50 cm (19.7 in) torpedo tubes were fitted, and 24 mines could be carried. These ships had a crew of 104 officers and ratings.

== Ships ==
Vessel (Note: "SMS" stands for "Seiner Majestät Schiff ", or "His Majesty's Ship" in German.) (Note: The prefix letter on German torpedo craft indicated the ship's builder. G= Germaniawerft.)	Launched	Completed	Fate
SMS G101	12 August 1914	4 March 1915	ex Santiago; Interned, Scapa Flow, 22 November 1918; scuttled 21 June 1919.
SMS G102	16 September 1914	8 April 1915	ex San Luis; Interned, Scapa Flow, 22 November 1918; beached while attempting to scuttle, 21 Jun 1919; to United States, 1920; sunk as aircraft target, 13 July 1921 off Cape Henry.
SMS G103	14 November 1914	15 May 1915	ex Santa Fé; Interned, Scapa Flow, 22 November 1918; scuttled 21 June 1919.
SMS G104	28 November 1914	5 June 1915	ex Tucuman; Interned, Scapa Flow, 22 November 1918; scuttled 21 June 1919

== Service ==
The four ships were all completed in 1915, forming the 2nd Torpedo Boat Flotilla along with the other large torpedo boats of the B 97 class. The G102s were slower than the B97s and as a result often operated separately. While they were officially designated as torpedo boats, as the G102 class and B97 class were significantly larger than the existing torpedo craft of the German Navy, they were known as destroyers (Zerstörer) rather than torpedo boats. All four ships were present at the Battle of Jutland. Three ships of the class took part in the destruction of a convoy running between Norway and England on 11 December 1917.

All four ships of the class survived the war and were interned at Scapa Flow, along with most of the rest of the High Seas Fleet on 22 November 1918. On 21 June 1919, the German Fleet at Scapa Flow was scuttled. While G101, G103 and G104 sank, G102 ran aground during the attempt and was sunk as a target by aircraft of the US Navy in 1921.
