= B 97-class destroyer =

1914 class of German torpedo boats

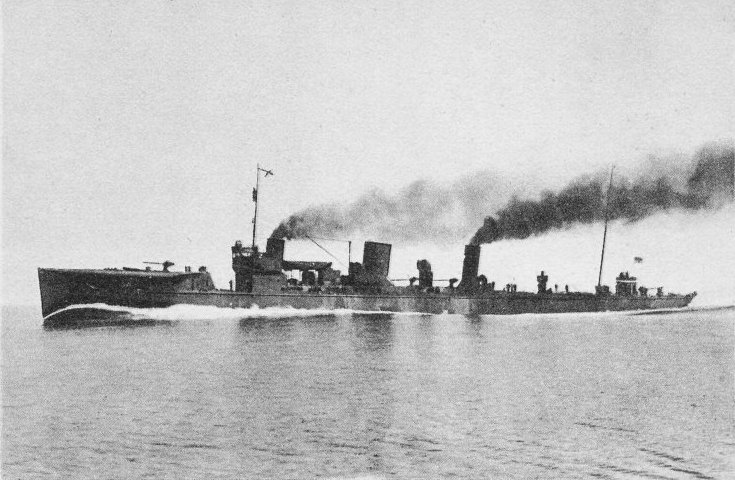
- SMS V 99

Class overview
- Builders: Blohm & Voss, AG Vulcan
- Operators: Imperial German Navy
- Succeeded by: G 101-class destroyer
- Built: 1914–1915
- In commission: 1915–1939
- Completed: 8
- Lost: 1
- Scrapped: 7

General characteristics
- Type: Destroyer
- Displacement: 1,374 t (1,352 long tons) normal; 1,843 t (1,814 long tons) deep load
- Length: 98.0 m (321 ft 6 in) oa
- Beam: 9.35 m (30 ft 8 in)
- Draught: 3.39 m (11 ft 1 in)
- Installed power: 40,000 PS (39,000 shp; 29,000 kW)
- Propulsion: 4 oil-fired Navy boilers; Steam turbines; 2 shafts
- Speed: 36 knots (67 km/h; 41 mph)
- Range: 2,620 nmi (4,850 km; 3,020 mi) at 20 knots (37 km/h; 23 mph)
- Complement: 114
- Armament: 4× 8.8 cm SK L/45 naval guns; 6× 500 mm (19.7 in) torpedo tubes

The B 97 class was a class of eight destroyers built for and operated by the Imperial German Navy (Kaiserliche Marine) during the First World War. They served throughout the war, with one being lost in 1915, five being scuttled at Scapa Flow in 1919 and one being transferred to Italy, where it remained in use until 1939.

== Design ==
As part of its 1912 construction programme, the Imperial Russian Navy placed orders for 22 large modern destroyers (the Orfey-class destroyer) for its Baltic Fleet. In order to speed delivery of these ships, orders for the ship's machinery were placed overseas, including in Germany. The outbreak of the First World War, with Germany declaring war on Russia on 1 August, led to delivery of these machinery sets to be stopped. The AG Vulcan shipyard in Stettin, (now Szczecin in Poland) proposed to use this machinery to power a class of large destroyers for the Imperial German Navy, which could be built within six months. The German navy was at first unenthusiastic about Vulcan's proposal, as its torpedo flotillas consisted of smaller torpedo boats, but Admiral Alfred von Tirpitz overcame these objections, and orders for four ships were placed with Vulcan and Blohm & Voss. Two more ships were ordered from Blohm & Voss in October that year, with a final two ships being ordered in January 1915.

As the new ships were much larger than the existing torpedo craft of the German Navy, they were known as destroyers (Zerstörer) rather than torpedo boats (Torpedoboote). The two shipyards built their destroyers to slightly different designs. The Blohm & Voss built ships were 98.0 metres (321 ft 6 in) long overall and 96.0 metres (315 ft 0 in) at the waterline, with a beam of 9.35 metres (30 ft 8 in). The first two Blohm & Voss ships, B 97 and B 98 had a draught of 3.42 metres (11 ft 3 in) while the later Blohm & Voss ships (B 109, B 110, B 111 and B 112) had a draught of 3.39 metres (11 ft 1 in). Displacement of the Blohm & Voss destroyers was 1,374 tonnes (1,352 long tons) normal and 1,843 tonnes (1,814 long tons) deep load. The two AG Vulcan-built ships (V 99 and V 100) had an overall length of 99.0 metres (324 ft 10 in), a waterline length of 98.0 metres (321 ft 6 in), a beam of 9.36 metres (30 ft 9 in) and a draught of 3.60 metres (11 ft 10 in). They displaced 1,350 tonnes (1,330 long tons) normal and 1,847 tonnes (1,818 long tons) deep load.

Four oil-fired boilers fed steam at 17–18.5 atm (250–272 psi; 1,720–1,870 kPa) to 2 sets of steam turbines rated at 40,000 metric horsepower (39,000 shp; 29,000 kW) and driving two propeller shafts. This gave a design speed of 36.5 knots (67.6 km/h; 42.0 mph) for the first four ships and 36 knots (67 km/h; 41 mph) for the last four ships. Speeds during sea trials reached as high as 37.4 knots (69.3 km/h; 43.0 mph). Three funnels were fitted (they were the first three-funneled torpedo craft built for the German Navy). The ships had a range of between 2,250 nautical miles (4,170 km; 2,590 mi) at 20 knots (37 km/h; 23 mph) for the Vulcan-built ships and 2,620 nautical miles (4,850 km; 3,020 mi) at 20 knots for the last four Blohm & Voss-built destroyers. The ships' complement was 114 officers and men when the ships entered service, although this grew to 140 by the end of the war.

As built, the ships' gun armament consisted of four 8.8 cm SK L/45 naval guns in four single mounts. (Note: SK stands for Schnellfeuerkanone – Quick firing cannon in German) (Note: L/45 refers to the length of the gun's barrel. In this case the barrel was 45 calibres long.) These guns could fire a 9 kg (20 lb) high explosive shell a distance of 11,790 m (12,890 yd) at a rate of 15 rounds per minute. 120 rounds per gun were carried. In common with most modern German destroyers, the B 97 class were re-armed in early 1916 by replacing the 8.8 cm guns with four 10.5 cm SK L/45 naval guns, which could fire a 17.4 kg (38 lb) shell to a distance of 9,460 metres (10,350 yd). 80 rounds per gun were carried. Six 50 cm (17.7 in) torpedo tubes were carried, with two fixed tubes just behind the ships' forecastle, and two twin tubes further aft on rotating mounts. (These mounts were splayed out at an angle of 15 degrees, unlike the twin mounts used by British destroyers.) 24 mines could be carried.

== Service ==
All eight ships entered service during 1915. They were employed in the Baltic Sea, North Sea and the English Channel. V 99 was sunk during a sortie into the Battle of the Gulf of Riga on 16–17 August 1915 with V 100. The two ships ran into several Russian destroyers, which hit V 99 with several shells. In attempting to escape, V 99 ran into a minefield and struck two mines, sinking as a result. Ships of the class took part in the Battle of Jutland, and in Operation Albion, where the Russian destroyer Grom was sunk.

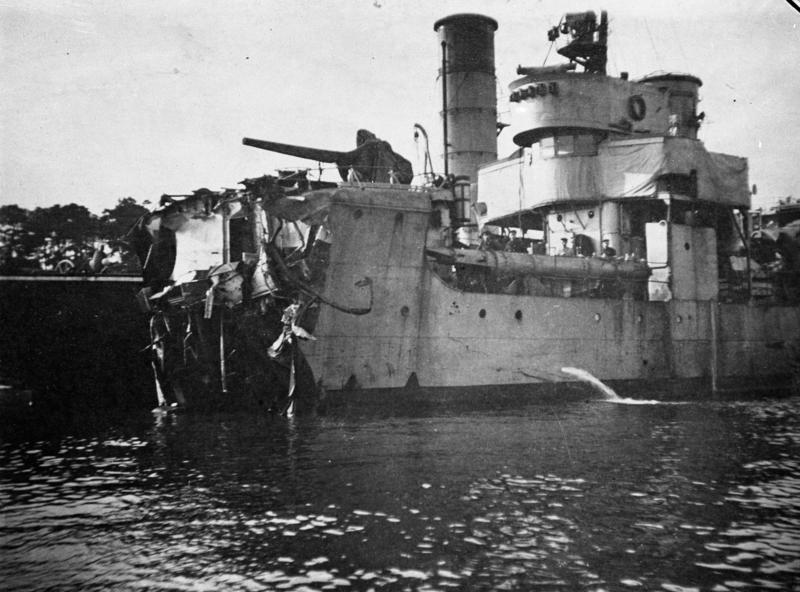
B 98 after having been mined in 1917

As a result of the Armistice of 11 November 1918 which ended fighting between the Western Allies and Germany, much of the German High Seas Fleet was ordered in be interned at Scapa Flow in Orkney. B 98 was employed to carry mail between Germany and the interned fleet, and it was noted that the German destroyer had poorer seakeeping than the V-class destroyers used to escort her, with the British ships able to maintain speed in rougher weather. On 21 June 1919, the German Fleet at Scapa Flow was scuttled, including V 100, B 109, B 110, B 111 and B 112. B 98 was carrying out a mail run at the time of the scuttling, and was seized by the British when she arrived at Scapa on 22 June. Whilst under tow (possibly to Rosyth to be broken up) during poor weather B 98 broke free and was driven ashore at the bay of Lopness, Sanday, Orkney. B 98 is recorded as stranding on 17 February 1920. B 98 was largely broken up for scrap some time after her stranding. The scuttled ships were salvaged and scrapped between 1919 and 1926.

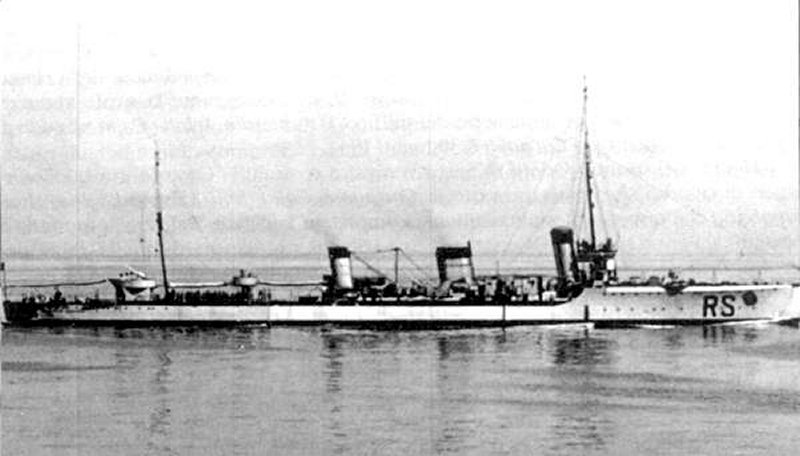
Cesare Rossarol, the former B 97 in Italian service

The remaining ship, B 97 was allocated to Italy as a war reparation, transferring on 19 September 1920. The Italians re-armed the ship, replacing the four 10.5 cm guns with three 120 mm (4.7 in) guns, with one twin mount forward and a single mount aft, with two 76 mm (3 in) anti aircraft guns added and the two fixed torpedo tubes removed. She was commissioned into the Italian Navy as Cesare Rossarol on 1 December 1924. The ship had its torpedo tubes replaced by 2 twin Italian 450 mm (17.7 in) tubes in 1931, and from 1932 she was used as an experimental ship. She was stricken on 17 January 1939.

== Ships ==
| Name (Note: "SMS" stands for "Seiner Majestät Schiff ", or "His Majesty's Ship" in German.) (Note: The prefix letter on German torpedo craft indicated the ship's builder. B= Blohm & Voss, V= AG Vulcan.) | Builder | Launched | Commissioned | Fate. |
|---|---|---|---|---|
| SMS B 97 | Blohm & Voss, Hamburg | 15 December 1914 | 13 February 1915 | Allocated to Italy as war reparation 1920. Commissioned in Italian Navy as Cesare Rossarol on 1 December 1924. Stricken 17 January 1939. |
| SMS B 98 | Blohm & Voss, Hamburg | 2 January 1915 | 24 March 1915 | Seized by United Kingdom on 22 June 1919. Went aground in Lopness Bay in 1920 where parts of wreck can still be seen. One gun is on show at the Scapa Flow Museum at Lyness. |
| SMS V 99 | AG Vulcan, Stettin | 9 February 1915 | 20 April 1915 | Mined following engagement with Russian destroyers in the Battle of the Gulf of Riga on 17 August 1915. |
| SMS V 100 | AG Vulcan, Stettin | 8 March 1915 | 17 June 1915 | Scuttled at Scapa Flow 21 June 1919. Salvaged 1919 and scrapped 1921. |
| SMS B 109 | Blohm & Voss, Hamburg | 11 March 1915 | 8 June 1915 | Scuttled at Scapa Flow 21 June 1919. Salvaged and scrapped 1926. |
| SMS B 110 | Blohm & Voss, Hamburg | 31 March 1915 | 26 June 1915 | Scuttled at Scapa Flow 21 June 1919. Salvaged 1925, scrapped 1926. |
| SMS B 111 | Blohm & Voss, Hamburg | 8 June 1915 | 10 August 1915 | Scuttled at Scapa Flow 21 June 1919. Salvaged and scrapped 1926. |
| SMS B 112 | Blohm & Voss, Hamburg | 17 June 1915 | 3 September 1915 | Scuttled at Scapa Flow 21 June 1919. Salvaged and scrapped 1926. |

== See also ==
- German ocean-going torpedo boats of World War I
