= HMS Milne (1914) =

Admiralty M-class destroyer of the British Royal Navy

History

United Kingdom
- Name: HMS Milne
- Builder: John Brown & Company, Clydebank
- Laid down: 18 November 1913
- Launched: 5 October 1914
- Completed: December 1914
- Fate: Sold for scrap 22 September 1921

General characteristics
- Class & type: Admiralty M-class destroyer
- Displacement: 1,100 long tons (1,118 t) full load
- Length: 273 ft 4 in (83.31 m)
- Beam: 26 ft 8 in (8.13 m)
- Draught: 8 ft 6 in (2.59 m)
- Propulsion: 3 shafts, steam turbines, 25,000 shp (18,642 kW)
- Speed: 34 knots (63 km/h; 39 mph)
- Range: 2,100 nmi (3,900 km; 2,400 mi)
- Complement: 80
- Armament: 3 × QF 4 in (100 mm) Mark IV guns; 2 × twin 21 inch (533 mm) torpedo tubes

HMS Milne was a Royal Navy Admiralty M-class destroyer. Milne was built by John Brown & Company from 1913 to 1914 and was completed in December that year. She served through the remainder of the First World War, at first with the Harwich Force with which she took part in the Battle of Dogger Bank in January 1915, and later with the Dover Patrol, sinking the German submarine UC-26 in May 1917. Milne was sold for scrap in 1921.

== Construction and design ==
The M-class was an improved version of the earlier Laforey-class destroyer, required to reach the higher speed of 36 knots (67 km/h; 41 mph) in order to counter rumoured German fast destroyers. The British Admiralty ordered six Admiralty M-class destroyers as part of the 1913–1914 Construction Programme for the Royal Navy, together with seven "builder's specials" which did not follow the standard design. Three destroyers, Milne, Moorsom and Morris were ordered from the Scottish shipbuilder John Brown & Company under this programme. Milne, the first of the three, was laid down at John Brown's Clydebank shipyard as Yard number 426 on 18 November 1913, launched on 5 October 1914 and completed in December 1914, at a price of £110,415. The warship was the first in service with the Royal Navy to be named after Admiral Sir David Milne.

Milne was 273 feet 4 inches (83.31 m) long overall and 265 feet 0 inches (80.77 m) between perpendiculars, with a beam of 26 feet 8 inches (8.13 m) and a draught of 8 feet 6 inches (2.59 m). Displacement was 900 long tons (914 t) legend and about 1,100 long tons (1,118 t) deep load. Four Yarrow three-drum boilers fed two sets of Parsons steam turbines rated at 25,000 shaft horsepower (19,000 kW), giving a normal maximum speed of 34 knots (63 km/h; 39 mph). Up to 228 tons of oil could be carried, giving an endurance of 2,100 nautical miles (3,900 km; 2,400 mi) at 15 knots (28 km/h; 17 mph). The ship's crew consisted of 80 officers and men. Armament consisted of three QF 4-inch (102 mm) Mk IV guns mounted on the ships centreline, together with two 2-pounder pom-pom anti-aircraft autocannons (Note: It was originally planned to fit 1-pounder pom-poms, but when built the ships were fitted with 1 1/2-pounder (37-mm) pom-poms which were later replaced by 2-pounder (40-mm) guns.) and four 21 inch (533 mm) torpedo tubes in two twin mounts.

== Service ==
=== 1914–1915 ===
Milne joined the 10th Destroyer Flotilla, part of the Harwich Force, which operated in the North Sea and could reinforce the Grand Fleet or forces in the English Channel as required.

On 23 January 1915, the German battlecruisers under Admiral Franz von Hipper made a sortie to attack British fishing boats on the Dogger Bank. British Naval Intelligence was warned of the raid by radio messages decoded by Room 40, and sent out the Battlecruiser Force from Rosyth, commanded by Admiral Beatty aboard Lion and the Harwich Force, commanded by Commodore Reginald Tyrwhitt aboard the light cruiser Arethusa were sent out to intercept the German force. Milne was one of seven M-class destroyers of the 10th Destroyer Flotilla sailing with the Harwich Force. The British and German Forces met on the morning of 24 January in the Battle of Dogger Bank. On sighting the British, Hipper ordered his ships to head south-east to escape the British, who set off in pursuit. Being the fastest destroyers available to the British, the seven M-class were sent ahead to report the strength of the German forces. Although briefly forced to turn away by fire from the armoured cruiser Blücher, they managed to successfully report the German's strength and course before being ordered to pull back and take up station ahead of the British line as Beatty's battlecruisers came into gun range of the German ships. At about 09:20, German destroyers appeared to be preparing a torpedo attack, and the British destroyers were ordered ahead of the line in order to prevent such an attack. Only the M-class destroyers had sufficient speed to respond and slowly draw ahead of the British battlecruisers, but no attack by German destroyers followed. Later, at about 11:00, an emergency turn to avoid a non-existent German submarine and misinterpretation of signals from Lion caused the British battlecruisers to concentrate on Blücher, already badly damaged and trailing well behind the other German ships, and allowing the rest of Hipper's fleet to escape. Blücher was eventually overwhelmed by British shells and torpedoes, sinking at 12:10.

On 31 January 1915, Milne was one of seven destroyers (Note: Miranda, Manly, Morris, Minos, Matchless, Milne and Murray) of the Harwich Force dispatched to Sheerness to make part in minelaying operations east of the Straits of Dover to restrict the movements of German U-Boats. They continued escorting the minelayer Paris until 9 February, and after supporting an air raid on the Belgian coast, returned to Harwich on 13 February. On 28 March 1915, four destroyers of the Harwich force (Laurel, Liberty, Leonidas and Lucifer) carried out an anti-submarine sweep off the Dutch coast. When a submarine was sighted, six more destroyers of the Harwich Force, including Milne, were sent to reinforce the patrol, but shortly after the two groups of destroyers met up, the force was recalled as radio intercepts indicated that German battlecruisers were about to sortie.

On 13 June 1915, the 10th Destroyer Flotilla was ordered to Avonmouth for operations in the South-West Approaches, and in particular, to escort troopships carrying the 13th Division to the Middle East on the initial part of their journey, with two destroyers per transport. After the 13th Division had all left, the 10th Flotilla continued on escort duties based at Devonport, escorting the ships carrying the next division to be sent to the Gallipoli campaign, the 12th Division. On 28 June, the cargo liner Armenian, carrying a load of mules, was sunk by the German submarine U-24, with Milne and sister ship Mansfield being sent out in response to Armenian's distress signals to hunt the submarine, which escaped unharmed. The 10th Flotilla continued carrying out escort operations from Devonport until relieved by the 3rd Destroyer Flotilla (also part of the Harwich Force) in mid-July. On 23 August 1915, 12 destroyers of the Harwich Force, including Milne, were attached to the Dover patrol to cover a bombardment of the German-held Belgian port of Zeebrugge by the monitors Lord Clive, Sir John Moore and Prince Rupert. Little damage was done, and the lock gates of the port, the principal objective of the operation, were untouched. On 25 December 1915, Milne was one of eight destroyers from the Harwich Force that were ordered with the leader Nimrod to the Channel as a result of attacks by the German submarine U-24.

=== 1916 ===
On the morning of 21 February 1916, Milne left Harwich as part of the Harwich Force to cover minesweeping operations in the North Sea. Later that day she collided with the destroyer Murray, with Murray having to be sent to Chatham for repair. (This operation was plagued with accidents – the destroyers Lark and Llewellyn had collided on leaving Harwich on the afternoon of 20 February, while the leader Tipperary had run aground when leaving harbour on the morning of 21 February.) From 24 April 1916, the Dover Patrol carried out a large-scale operation off the Belgian coast to lay mines and nets, in an attempt to limit use of the ports of Ostend and Zeebrugge to German U-boats. Milne was one of twelve destroyers of the Harwich Force that took part in escorting the operations. On the afternoon of 24 April, three German torpedo boats (Note: V47, V67 and V68.) attempted to interfere with the drifters laying the nets off Zeebrugge, and Milne, together with Murray, Medea and Melpomene, engaged the three torpedo boats, which retreated towards Zeebrugge with the four British destroyers in pursuit. The British destroyers came under heavy fire from German shore batteries. Murray was hit in the forecastle by a single 150 mm shell that failed to explode, while Melpomene was hit in the engine room and lost power. Milne attempted to take Melpomene under tow, but fouled her port propeller with the tow cable, so Medea went to assist with the tow. The three German torpedo boats then returned to attack the British ships, with Medea hit three times by German shells, but were driven off by 12-inch fire from the monitor Prince Eugene. The minefield probably caused the loss of one U-Boat, UB-13, although at the time it was thought that four or five German submarines had been sunk.

On the night of 22 July 1916, two light cruisers and eight destroyers of the Harwich Force set out on a patrol to prevent German torpedo boats based in Flanders from interfering with shipping traffic between Britain and the Netherlands. One group, consisting of the light cruiser Carysfort and four destroyers, was to patrol off the Mass estuary, while the second group, led by the cruiser Canterbury and including Milne, was to patrol off the North Hinder light vessel. Eight German destroyers of II Flotilla had set out from Zeebrugge on a mission to lay lines near the North Hinder light vessel, and at 00:15 on 23 July, Carysfort's group sighted the German force, which turned away and escaped under the cover of a smoke screen and a rain storm. The Canterbury group, including Milne, was ordered to proceed to the Schouwen Bank to intercept the Germans. They encountered the Germans at about 01:45, and set off in pursuit. Matchless could not keep up with the chase and lagged behind, while Milne kept station with the lagging Matchless, leaving the chase to Morris and Melpomene. The German destroyers managed to reach the safety of minefields and coastal defences near Zeebrugge, and the British broke off the chase.

=== 1917–1918 ===
On 22 January 1917, the German Sixth Torpedo Boat Flotilla, consisting of 11 torpedo boats (equivalent in size and armament to British destroyers) set out from Helgoland to Flanders to reinforce the German torpedo boat forces based in the Belgian ports. Decoding of German radio signals by Room 40 warned the British of the German intentions and the Harwich Force was deployed to intercept the German ships on the night of 22/23 January. The British set six light cruisers, two flotilla leaders and sixteen destroyers to intercept the eleven German ships, deploying them in several groups to make sure that all possible routes were covered. Milne was one of four destroyers (Note: Milne, Starfish, Surprise and Simoom.) patrolling to the west of the Schouwen Bank. The German destroyers ran into a cruiser division, with the destroyers V69 and G41 heavily damaged, but the Germans managed to escape, and passed Surprise's group of destroyers unobserved before reaching Zeebrugge. One German straggler, S50 encountered Milne's group. An exchange of fire followed, in which S50 was hit several times by British shells, but S50 managed to torpedo the British destroyer Simoom, which later sank, before escaping and returning to Germany. On 29 January 1917, the British were warned by radio intercepts of a potential sortie by German Forces, and the Harwich Force, including Milne was ordered out to intercept any German torpedo boats between Harwich and Lowestoft. Nothing was seen, with German forces staying close to home. On 28 February 1917, Milne was one of five destroyers escorting shipping from the Netherlands to Britain when she sighted a periscope and was missed by a torpedo. Milne retaliated with a depth charge, but there was no apparent effect.

On 30 April 1917, Milne joined the 6th Destroyer Flotilla, part of the Dover Patrol. Early on 9 May 1917, (Note: 00:50 hr according to the Naval Staff Monograph and at dawn according to Kemp and Dorling.) Milne was on patrol in the Dover Straits off Calais when she sighted a German submarine, UC-26. UC-26 attempted to escape, but her rudders jammed and she was too slow to dive away, and was rammed by Milne, which followed up with three depth charges, sending the submarine to the bottom of the Channel. Eight men managed to escape from the rapidly flooding submarine, but only two survived to be picked up by Milne, which suffered a badly distorted stem in the attack, and returned to Dover with fragments of UC-26's hull embedded in her bows.

Milne was still part of the 6th Flotilla in August 1918, but by the end of the war was in the process of transferring to the 21st Destroyer Flotilla, part of the Grand Fleet. By February 1919, however, she was listed as having returned to the Sixth Flotilla.

== Disposal ==
By this time the M-class destroyers were worn-out, and by May 1919, Milne was in reserve at the Nore. She was sold on 22 September 1921 and scrapped in Germany.

== Pennant numbers ==
Pennant number	Dates
H8A	1914–January 1918
H80	January 1918–September 1918
D12	September 1918 –

== Sources ==
- Bacon, Reginald (1919). The Dover Patrol 1915–1917: Volume I. London: Hutchinson & Co. OCLC 252062093.
- Bacon, Reginald (1919). The Dover Patrol 1915–1917: Volume II. London: Hutchinson & Co. OCLC 867981501.
- Burt, R. A. (1986). Warships Illustrated No 7: British Destroyers in World War One. London: Arms & Armour Press. ISBN 0-85368-753-6.
- Corbett, Julian S. (1921). Naval Operations: Vol II. History of the Great War. London: Longmans, Green and Co.
- Corbett, Julian S. (1923). Naval Operations: Volume III. History of the Great War. London: Longmans, Green and Co.
- Dittmar, F.G; Colledge, J.J. (1972). British Warships 1914–1919. Shepperton, UK: Ian Allan. ISBN 0-7110-0380-7.
- Dorling, Taprell (1932). Endless Story: Being an Account of the Work of the Destroyers, Flotilla Leaders, Torpedo-Boats and Patrol Boats in the Great War. London: Hodder and Stoughton.
- Friedman, Norman (2009). British Destroyers: From Earliest Days to the Second World War. Barnsley, UK: Seaforth Publishing. ISBN 978-1-84832-049-9.
- Gardiner, Robert; Gray, Randal, eds. (1985). Conway's All The World's Fighting Ships 1906–1921. London: Conway Maritime Press. ISBN 0-85177-245-5.
- Grant, Robert M. (1964). U-Boats Destroyed: The Effect of Anti-Submarine Warfare 1914–1918. London: Putnam. OCLC 4093996.
- Karau, Mark D. (2014). The Naval Flank of the Western Front: The German MarineKorps Flandern 1914–1918. Barnsley, UK: Seaforth Publishing. ISBN 978-1-84832-231-8.
- Kemp, Paul (1997). U-Boats Destroyed: German Submarine Losses in the World Wars. London: Arms & Armour Press. ISBN 1-85409-321-5.
- Manning, Thomas Davys (1961). The British Destroyer. London: Putnam.
- Manning, Thomas Davys; Walker, Charles Frederick (1959). British Warship Names. London: Putnam. OCLC 780274698.
- Massie, Robert K. (2007). Castles of Steel: Britain, Germany and the Winning of the War at Sea. London: Vintage Books. ISBN 978-0-099-52378-9.
- McBride, Keith (1991). "British 'M' Class Destroyers of 1913–14". In Gardiner, Robert (ed.). Warship 1991. London: Conway Maritime Press. pp. 34–49. ISBN 0-85177-582-9.
- Monograph No. 12: The Action of Dogger Bank, January 24th, 1915 (PDF). Naval Staff Monographs (Historical). Vol. III. Naval Staff, Training and Staff Duties Division. 1921. pp. 209–226.
- Monograph No. 23: Home Waters Part I: From the Outbreak of War to 27 August 1914 (PDF). Naval Staff Monographs (Historical). Vol. X. Naval Staff, Training and Staff Duties Division. 1924.
- Monograph No. 29: Home Waters—Part IV.: From February to July 1915 (PDF). Naval Staff Monographs (Historical). Vol. XIII. The Naval Staff, Training and Staff Duties Division. 1925.
- Monograph No. 30: Home Waters Part V: From July to October 1915 (PDF). Naval Staff Monographs (Historical). Vol. XIV. Naval Staff, Training and Staff Duties Division. 1926.
- Monograph No. 31: Home Waters Part VI: From October 1915 to May 1916 (PDF). Naval Staff Monographs (Historical). Vol. XV. Naval Staff, Training and Staff Duties Division. 1926.
- Monograph No. 33: Home Waters Part VII: From June 1916 to November 1916 (PDF). Naval Staff Monographs (Historical). Vol. XVII. Naval Staff, Training and Staff Duties Division. 1927.
- Monograph No. 34: Home Waters—Part VIII: December 1916 to April 1917 (PDF). Naval Staff Monographs (Historical). Vol. XVIII. The Naval Staff, Training and Staff Duties Division. 1933.
- Monograph No. 35: Home Waters—Part IX: 1 May 1917 to 31st July 1917 (PDF). Naval Staff Monographs (Historical). Vol. XIX. The Naval Staff, Training and Staff Duties Division. 1939.
- Newbolt, Henry (1928). Naval Operations: Volume IV. History of the Great War. London: Longmans, Green and Co.
