= HMS Matchless (1914) =

Destroyer of the Royal Navy

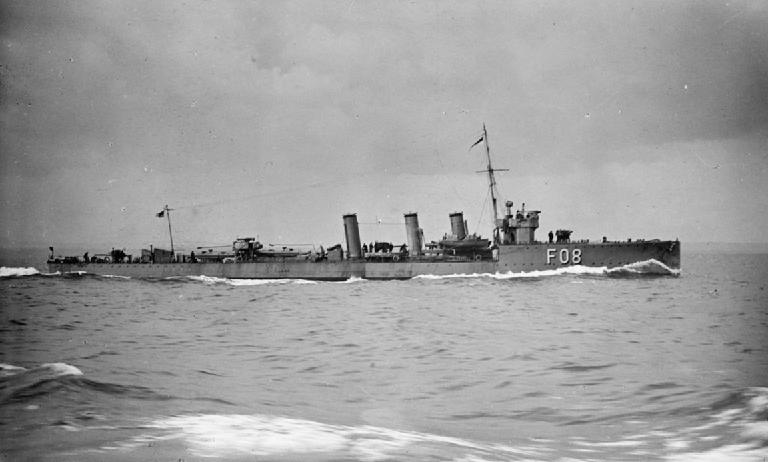
- Sister ship HMS Oracle

History

United Kingdom
- Name: HMS Matchless
- Builder: Swan Hunter, Wallsend, Tyneside
- Laid down: 8 November 1913
- Launched: 5 October 1914
- Completed: December 1914
- Fate: Sold for scrap 26 October 1921

General characteristics
- Class & type: Admiralty M-class destroyer
- Displacement: 1,100 long tons (1,118 t) full load
- Length: 273 ft 4 in (83.31 m)
- Beam: 26 ft 8 in (8.13 m)
- Draught: 8 ft 6 in (2.59 m)
- Propulsion: 3 shafts, steam turbines, 25,000 shp (18,642 kW)
- Speed: 34 knots (63 km/h; 39 mph)
- Range: 2,100 nmi (3,900 km; 2,400 mi)
- Complement: 80
- Armament: 3 × QF 4 in (100 mm) Mark IV guns; 2 × twin 21 inch (533 mm) torpedo tubes

HMS Matchless was a Royal Navy Admiralty M-class destroyer. Matchless was built by Swan Hunter from 1913 to 1914 and was completed in December that year. She served through the remainder of the First World War, operating in the North Sea as part of the Harwich Force in the early part of the war and later in the English Channel as part of the Dover Patrol, where she took part in both the First and Second Ostend Raids. Despite being badly damaged by a German mine in 1915 and being involved in several collisions, she survived the war, and was sold for scrap in 1921.

== Construction and design ==
Matchless was ordered from Swan Hunter as part of the 1913–1914 Construction Programme for the Royal Navy, one of six Admiralty M-class destroyers ordered under the programme, together with seven "builder's specials" which did not follow the standard design. The M-class was an improved version of the earlier Laforey-class destroyer, required to reach the higher speed of 36 knots (67 km/h; 41 mph) in order to counter rumoured German fast destroyers. Matchless was laid down at Swan Hunter's Wallsend, Tyneside shipyard on 8 November 1913, launched on 5 October 1914 and completed in December 1914, at a price of £118,581.

Matchless was 273 feet 4 inches (83.31 m) long overall and 265 feet 0 inches (80.77 m) between perpendiculars, with a beam of 26 feet 8 inches (8.13 m) and a draught of 8 feet 6 inches (2.59 m). Displacement was 900 long tons (914 t) legend and about 1,100 long tons (1,118 t) deep load. Four Yarrow three-drum boilers fed two sets of Parsons steam turbines rated at 25,000 shaft horsepower (19,000 kW), giving a normal maximum speed of 34 knots (63 km/h; 39 mph). Up to 228 tons of oil could be carried, giving an endurance of 2,100 nautical miles (3,900 km; 2,400 mi) at 15 knots (28 km/h; 17 mph). The ship's crew consisted of 80 officers and men. Armament consisted of three QF 4-inch (102 mm) Mk IV guns mounted on the ships centreline, together with two 2-pounder pom-pom anti-aircraft autocannons (Note: It was originally planned to fit 1-pounder pom-poms, but when built the ships were fitted with 1 1/2-pounder (37-mm) pom-poms which were later replaced by 2-pounder (40-mm) guns.) and four 21 inch (533 mm) torpedo tubes in two twin mounts.

== Service ==
=== 1915 ===
On 1 January 1915, the battleship Formidable was torpedoed and sunk by the German submarine U-24 in the English Channel. Matchless, at sea at the time, was diverted to take part in the search for U-24. Matchless joined the Harwich Force, which operated in the North Sea and could reinforce the Grand Fleet or forces in the English Channel as required. On 31 January 1915, Matchless was one of seven destroyers (Note: Miranda, Manly, Morris, Minos, Matchless, Milne and Murray) of the Harwich Force dispatched to Sheerness to make part in minelaying operations east of the Straits of Dover to restrict the movements of German U-Boats. They continued escorting the minelayer Paris until 9 February. By June 1915, Matchless was listed as part of the 10th Destroyer Flotilla, as part of the Harwich Force. On 13 June 1915, the 10th Destroyer Flotilla, including Matchless, was ordered to Avonmouth for operations in the South-West Approaches, and in particular, to escort troopships carrying the 13th Division to the Middle East on the initial part of their journey, with two destroyers per transport. After the 13th Division had all left, the 10th Flotilla continued on escort duties based at Devonport, escorting the ships carrying the next division to be sent to the Gallipoli campaign, the 12th Division. The 10th Flotilla was relieved from its escort duty in July 1915, allowing it to return to Harwich. On 16 August 1915, 8 destroyers of the 10th Flotilla, including Matchless, escorted the minelayer Princess Margaret which was tasked with laying a minefield on the Arum Bank. The force encountered five patrolling German destroyers, and the German destroyer B98 torpedoed the destroyer Mentor, blowing off Mentor's bows, and then turned away. This caused the operation to be abandoned. Despite the damage, Mentor made it safely back to Harwich. On 30 October Matchless took part in a sweep by the Harwich Force of the German Bight during which the Swedish steamer Osterland was stopped and sent to the Humber for investigation of a suspicious cargo of iron ore.

On the night of 8/9 November 1915, Matchless set out with the Harwich Force to cover the minelayers Princess Margaret and Angora as they laid a minefield off the Amrum Bank. Severe weather caused Admiral Reginald Tyrwhitt, commander of the Harwich Force, to order his destroyers back to base. On the return journey, Matchless struck a mine off Orfordness, on 9 November when travelling up a channel which had previously been swept clear of mines. Matchless' stern was blown off, but none of the ship's crew was killed or injured. The damaged destroyer was taken under tow by sister ship Murray and successfully taken into Harwich. Matchless was repaired at Chatham Dockyard The mine had been laid by the German submarine UC-6 on 6–7 November.

=== 1916 ===
On 24 April 1916, a force of German battlecruisers and cruiser set out from Kiel to bombard the coastal towns of Lowestoft and Yarmouth. Later that day, the German battlecruiser Seydlitz struck a mine, and the resultant radio traffic warned the British of the German operation. The light cruisers and five destroyers of the Harwich Force left port at midnight on the night of 24/25 April, with Matchless leaving Harwich just after 01:00hr Heavily outnumbered, Tyrwhitt turned away in an attempt to lure the German forces away from Lowestoft, but the Germans ignored this move and shelled Lowestoft before moving North towards their next target, Yarmouth. On observing this Tyrwhitt again turned his ships in pursuit of the raiders, and engaged the light cruisers screening the German force just as the German battlecruisers started to shell Yarmouth. The German battlecruisers aborted their bombardment to engage the Harwich force, hitting the cruiser Conquest and the destroyer Laertes but retired to the East rather than attempt to destroy the smaller British force. Matchless was undamaged.

On the night of 22 July 1916, two light cruisers and eight destroyers of the Harwich Force set out on a patrol to prevent German torpedo boats based in Flanders from interfering with shipping traffic between Britain and the Netherlands. One group, consisting of the light cruiser Carysfort and four destroyers, was to patrol off the Mass estuary, while the second group, led by the cruiser Canterbury and including Matchless, was to patrol off the North Hinder light vessel. Eight German destroyers of II Flotilla had set out from Zeebrugge on a mission to lay lines near the North Hinder light vessel, and at 00:15 on 23 July, Carysfort's group sighted the German force, which turned away and escaped under the cover of a smoke screen and a rain storm. The Canterbury group, including Matchless, was ordered to proceed to the Schouwen Bank to intercept the Germans. They encountered the Germans at about 01:45, and set off in pursuit. Matchless could not keep up with the chase and lagged behind, while Milne kept station with the lagging Matchless, leaving the chase to Morris and Melpomene. The German destroyers managed to reach the safety of minefields and coastal defences near Zeebrugge, and the British broke off the chase.

On the night of 26/27 July 1916, Matchless was returning to Harwich after a collision with the destroyer Manly, when she collided in thick fog with the torpedo boat TB 9, sinking TB 9. Matchless was still under repair on 19 August.

=== 1917 ===
Matchless was one of eight destroyers of the 10th Flotilla sent with the destroyer leader Nimrod to Dunkirk on 19 January 1917 to provide reinforcement to the Dover Patrol in the event of German torpedo attacks on the Dover Barrage and shipping in the English Channel. On 22 January, an intercepted German radio signal warned the British Admiralty that the German VI Torpedo Boat Flotilla was to be sent from the High Seas Fleet to reinforce their forces at Flanders. Six destroyers, including Matchless, were released with Nimrod back to the Harwich Force in order to take part in operations to stop the transfer of torpedo boats. The British set six light cruisers, two flotilla leaders and sixteen destroyers to intercept the eleven German ships, deploying them in several groups to make sure that all possible routes were covered. Matchless was one of six destroyers, led by Nimrod that were to patrol east of the Schouwen Bank. The German destroyers ran into a cruiser division, with the destroyers V69 and G41 heavily damaged, but the Germans managed to escape under the cover of a smokescreen. Nimrod's group of destroyers headed north-east to cut-off the return route to the German Bight, but were ordered back to their station. The main group of German torpedo boats managed to sneak past the British patrols, but a straggler, S50, which was following the same route, ran into the five destroyers patrolling west of the Schouwen Bank. An exchange of fire followed, in which S50 was hit several times by British shells, but managed to torpedo the British destroyer Simoom. Nimrod's division spotted the fighting and came up from the east, but S50 escaped in the confusion, returning to Germany. Nimrod and Matchless both attempted to take the stricken Simoom under tow, but these attempts failed, and Simoom was scuttled by gunfire from Matchless.

On 10 February 1917, Matchless was escorting a convoy from the Netherlands to Britain when she spotted a submarine, possibly SM UC-4, and opened fire on the submarine, which dived away. After dropping a depth charge, Matchless returned to the convoy, calling up further ships to continue the hunt. Both the destroyer Meteor and the patrol boat P.31 sighted and attacked the submarine, which was undamaged.

On 9 April 1917, Matchless transferred to the Dover Patrol. On 20 April 1917, she, along with Nugent, Morris and Amazon, was patrolling on the French side of the Channel near Calais, with the leaders Swift and Broke patrolled the centre of the Channel, with other groups guarding the Downs or waiting in reserve. That night, German torpedo boats launched an attack on the Channel, in what became known as the Battle of Dover Strait. Six torpedo boats (Group Gautier) were to bombard Dover and attack the Dover Barrage on the north side of the channel, with six more (Group Albrecht) were to attack Calais and the southern part of the barrage. Three more torpedo boats were to operate near the Downs. Group Albrecht arrived off Calais at about 23:15 hr and fired about 300 shells before withdrawing. While Matchless's division spotted gunfire from this bombardment, they did not encounter any of the German ships. Group Gautier fired on and damaged an armed trawler, the Sabreur, and ineffectually shelled Dover. On the return journey they were intercepted by the British destroyers Swift and Broke which sank the torpedo boats G42 and G85. On 29 May, Matchless was accidentally rammed by the destroyer Minos and badly damaged. She was towed into Dover and beached to avoid sinking.

=== 1918 ===
On 22 April 1918, the British launched attacks against Zeebrugge and Ostend, with the intention of blocking the entrances to the canals linking these ports with Bruges and thus stopping U-boat operations from the Flanders ports. Matchless was assigned to the Ostend operation, patrolling off the port and supporting the small craft taking part in the operation. While the Zeebrugge operation partially blocked the canal locks, that at Ostend was a failure, and it was decided to repeat the Ostend operation as soon as practicable. The operation was repeated on the night of 9/10 May 1918, with Matchless again taking part of the operation. The operation was a failure, with the blockship Vindictive failing to block the main shipping channel. On the night of 28/29 September 1918, Matchless took part in a bombardment of German positions on the Belgian coast in support of the advance of Allied ground forces. Matchless remained part of the Dover patrol at the end of the war.

=== Disposal ===
By the end of the war, many of the M-class destroyers were worn-out, and by May 1919 Matchless was in reserve at the Nore. She was reduced to a Care and Maintenance party on 9 February 1920. Matchless was sold for scrap to the Barking Ship Breaking Company on 26 October 1921.

== Pennant numbers ==
Pennant number	Dates
H4A	1914–January 1918
H73	January 1918–September 1918
D47	September 1918 –

== Bibliography ==
- Bacon, Reginald (1919). The Dover Patrol 1915–1917: Volume II. London: Hutchinson & Co. OCLC 867981501.
- Corbett, Julian Stafford (1921). Naval Operations: Volume II. History of the Great War. London: Longmans, Green & Co.
- Corbett, Julian S. (1923). Naval Operations: Volume III. History of the Great War. London: Longmans, Green and Co.
- Dittmar, F.G; Colledge, J.J. (1972). British Warships 1914–1919. Shepperton, UK: Ian Allan. ISBN 0-7110-0380-7.
- Dorling, Taprell (1932). Endless Story: Being an account of the work of the Destroyers, Flotilla Leaders, Torpedo-Boats and Patrol Boats in the Great War. London: Hodder and Stoughton.
- Friedman, Norman (2009). British Destroyers: From Earliest Days to the Second World War. Barnsley, UK: Seaforth Publishing. ISBN 978-1-84832-049-9.
- Gardiner, Robert; Gray, Randal, eds. (1985). Conway's All The World's Fighting Ships 1906–1921. London: Conway Maritime Press. ISBN 0-85177-245-5.
- Karau, Mark D. (2014). The Naval Flank of the Western Front: The German MarineKorps Flandern 1914–1918. Barnsley, UK: Seaforth Publishing. ISBN 978-1-84832-231-8.
- McBride, Keith (1991). "British 'M' Class Destroyers of 1913–14". In Gardiner, Robert (ed.). Warship 1991. London: Conway Maritime Press. pp. 34–49. ISBN 0-85177-582-9.
- Massie, Robert K. (2007). Castles of Steel: Britain, Germany and the Winning of the War at Sea. London: Vintage Books. ISBN 978-0-099-52378-9.
- Monograph No. 18: The Dover Command: Vol. I (PDF). Naval Staff Monographs (Historical). Vol. VI. The Naval Staff, Training and Staff Duties Division. 1922.
- Monograph No. 23: Home Waters Part I: From the Outbreak of War to 27 August 1914 (PDF). Naval Staff Monographs (Historical). Vol. X. Naval Staff, Training and Staff Duties Division. 1924.
- Monograph No. 28: Home Waters—Part III.: From November 1914 to the end of January 1915 (PDF). Naval Staff Monographs (Historical). Vol. XII. The Naval Staff, Training and Staff Duties Division. 1925.
- Monograph No. 29: Home Waters—Part IV.: From February to July 1915 (PDF). Naval Staff Monographs (Historical). Vol. XIII. The Naval Staff, Training and Staff Duties Division. 1925.
- Monograph No. 30: Home Waters—Part V.: From August 1915 to October 1915 (PDF). Naval Staff Monographs (Historical). Vol. XIV. The Naval Staff, Training and Staff Duties Division. 1926.
- Monograph No. 31: Home Waters—Part VI.: From October 1915 to May 1916 (PDF). Naval Staff Monographs (Historical). Vol. XV. The Naval Staff, Training and Staff Duties Division. 1926.
- Monograph No. 32: Lowestoft Raid: 24th – 25th April, 1916 (PDF). Naval Staff Monographs (Historical). Vol. XVI. The Naval Staff, Training and Staff Duties Division. 1927.
- Monograph No. 33: Home Waters Part VII: From June 1916 to November 1916 (PDF). Naval Staff Monographs (Historical). Vol. XVII. Naval Staff, Training and Staff Duties Division. 1927.
- Monograph No. 34: Home Waters Part VIII: December 1916 to April 1917 (PDF). Naval Staff Monographs (Historical). Vol. XVIII. Naval Staff, Training and Staff Duties Division. 1933.
- Monograph No. 35: Home Waters Part IX: 1st May 1917 to 31st July 1917 (PDF). Naval Staff Monographs (Historical). Vol. XIX. Naval Staff, Training and Staff Duties Division. 1939.
- Newbolt, Henry (1928). Naval Operations: Volume IV. History of the Great War. London: Longmans, Green and Co.
- Newbolt, Henry (1931). Naval Operations: Volume V. History of the Great War. London: Longmans, Green and Co.
- Terry, C. Sanford, ed. (1919). Ostend and Zeebrugge: April 23:May 10 1918: The Dispatches of Vice-Admiral Roger Keyes K.C.B, K.V.C.O and other Narratives of the Operations. Oxford University Press.
