= HMS Melpomene (1915) =

Destroyer of the Royal Navy

History

United Kingdom
- Name: HMS Melpomene
- Builder: Fairfield Shipbuilding and Engineering Company, Govan
- Launched: 1 February 1915
- Completed: 16 August 1915
- Fate: Sold 9 May 1921

General characteristics
- Class & type: Medea-class destroyer
- Displacement: 1,178 long tons (1,197 t) deep load
- Length: 273 ft 4 in (83.31 m) oa
- Beam: 26 ft 8 in (8.13 m)
- Draught: 11 ft 2 in (3.40 m)
- Installed power: 25,000 shp (19,000 kW)
- Propulsion: 3× Yarrow boilers; Brown-Curtis steam turbines; 3 shafts
- Speed: 32 kn (37 mph; 59 km/h)
- Complement: 79
- Armament: 3 × 4-inch (102 mm) guns; 1 × 2-pounder (40 mm) gun; 4 × 21 inch (533 mm) torpedo tubes

HMS Melpomene was a Medea-class destroyer of the British Royal Navy. She was one of four destroyers, of similar design to the British M-class ordered by Greece in June 1914, which the British purchased during construction owing to the outbreak of the First World War.

Medusa (originally named Samos) was launched by the Scottish shipbuilder Fairfield in February 1915 and was completed in August that year. She served with the Harwich Force in the North Sea and later with the Dover Patrol. She was sold for scrap in 1921.

== Design ==
In 1914, rivalries between Greece and Turkey led to Greece placing large orders for new warships, including a Bretagne-class battleship from France and two light cruisers and four destroyers from Britain. The British ships were ordered from the Coventry Syndicate, a consortium of the shipbuilders John Brown, Fairfield and Cammell Laird and the armament manufacturer Coventry Ordnance Works. The cruisers were to be built by Cammell Laird while two destroyers each would be built by John Brown and Fairfield.

The destroyers were of similar design to the contemporary M-class being built for the British Royal Navy, with the major difference being a modified machinery arrangement.

The ships were 273 feet 4 inches (83.31 m) long overall and 265 feet 0 inches (80.77 m) between perpendiculars, with a beam of 26 feet 8 inches (8.13 m) and a draught of 11 feet 2 inches (3.40 m). Displacement was 1,040 long tons (1,060 t) normal and 1,178 long tons (1,197 t) deep load. (Note: Displacements are for Melpomene's sister ship Melampus. Conway's states normal displacement ranges of 1,007–1,040 long tons (1,023–1,057 t) and a deep load displacement of about 1,200 long tons (1,220 t).) Three Yarrow water-tube boilers fed steam to Brown-Curtis impulse steam turbines, driving two propeller shafts. The machinery was rated at 25,000 shaft horsepower (19,000 kW) giving a speed of 32 knots (37 mph; 59 km/h). The ship's boilers were arranged with two boilers in one large compartment adjacent to the engine room and one in a smaller compartment forward, while the British M-class had the larger boiler compartment forward and the small boiler compartment adjacent to the engine room. Three funnels were fitted.

Armament consisted of three 4-inch (102 mm) Mark VII guns on PXIII mountings, with these being replaced by QF 4-inch Mark IV guns on PIX mountings in 1918, and two twin 21-inch (533 mm) torpedo tubes. The ship had a crew of 79.

== Construction and service ==
The four destroyers were ordered in June 1914, but the outbreak of the First World War resulted in them being purchased by Britain in August 1914. The second of the two ships built by Fairfield, named Samos by the Greeks, was launched at Fairfield's Govan shipyard on 1 February 1915 and was completed in August that year.

Melpomene joined the 10th Destroyer Flotilla of the Harwich Force following commissioning. On 23 August 1915, the Dover Patrol bombarded the German-held port of Zeebrugge, with Melpomene one of twelve destroyers from the Harwich Force attached to the Dover Patrol for this action. While at the time, the British believed that the bombardment was successful, in fact, little damage was done. On 30–31 October 1915, Melpomene took part in a sweep by the Harwich Force of the German Bight. The Swedish steamer Ostersund was stopped and sent back to the Humber as it was suspected that its cargo of iron ore might be contraband, but no German shipping was encountered. On 25 December 1915, Melpomene was one of eight destroyers from the Harwich Force that were ordered with the leader Nimrod to the Channel as a result of attacks by the German submarine U-24. As there was no sign of the submarine by the time they reached Portsmouth, they were sent on to Milford Haven, where poor weather kept them largely confined to harbour.

From 24 April 1916, the Dover Patrol carried out a large-scale operation off the Belgian coast to lay mines and nets, in an attempt to limit use of the ports of Ostend and Zeebrugge to German U-boats. Melpomene was one of twelve destroyers of the Harwich Force that took part in escorting the operations. On the afternoon of 24 April, three German torpedo boats (V47, V67 and V68) attempted to interfere with the drifters laying the nets off Zeebrugge, and Melpomene, together with Milne, Medea and Murray, engaged the three torpedo boats, which retreated towards Zeebrugge with the four British destroyers in pursuit. The British destroyers came under heavy fire from German shore batteries.

Melpomene was hit in the engine room by a shell, which although it did not explode, caused extensive flooding and eventual loss of power (she managed to keep steaming for 20 minutes after the hit, with the turbines awash and eventually submerged). Milne attempted to take Melpomene under tow, but fouled her port propeller with the tow cable, so Medea went to assist with the tow. The three German torpedo boats then returned to attack the British ships, with Medea hit three times by German shells, but were driven off by 12-inch fire from the monitor Prince Eugene. The minefield probably caused the loss of one U-Boat, UB-13, although at the time it was thought that four or five German submarines had been sunk. Melpomene underwent initial repair at Dunkirk before more permanent repair work in a British dockyard.

On the night of 22 July 1916, two light cruisers and eight destroyers of the Harwich Force set out on a patrol to prevent German torpedo boats based in Flanders from interfering with shipping traffic between Britain and the Netherlands. One group, consisting of the light cruiser Carysfort and four destroyers, was to patrol off the Mass estuary, while the second group, led by the cruiser Canterbury and including Melpomene, (Note: Canterbury, Melpomene, Morris, Milne and Matchless.) was to patrol off the North Hinder light vessel. Seven German destroyers of II Flotilla (Note: B97, G101, G103, G104, B110, B111 and B112) had set out from Zeebrugge on a mission to lay lines near the North Hinder light vessel, and at 00:15 on 23 July, Carysfort's group sighted the German force, which turned away and escaped under the cover of a smoke screen and a rain storm. The Canterbury group, including Matchless, was ordered to proceed to the Schouwen Bank to intercept the Germans.

They encountered the Germans at about 01:45, and set off in pursuit. Matchless could not keep up with the chase and lagged behind, while Milne kept station with the lagging Matchless, leaving the chase to Melpomene and Morris. The two destroyers were recalled by Canterbury, but Melpomene did not respond to the recall order and continued the chase alone. The German destroyers managed to reach the safety of minefields and coastal defences near Zeebrugge, and the British broke off the chase. Melpomene was hit by a German shell which killed one and wounded two more of her crew. On 19 August, the German High Seas Fleet carried out a raid into the North Sea, with the intention of bombarding Sunderland and luring the British battlecruisers into an engagement with superior forces. The British were warned of the German sortie by radio intercepts, and as part of the British response, the seaplane carrier Vindex put out from Harwich with Melpomene as escort, but the weather was too poor for aircraft operations and Vindex returned to harbour.

On the night of 23/24 January 1917, the Harwich Force was ordered to intercept a German torpedo boat flotilla that was being transferred to Zeebrugge, with Melpomene part of a group of destroyers patrolling off the River Maas. The German torpedo boats ran into a cruiser division, with the torpedo boat V69 heavily damaged, but the Germans managed to escape, and some of the British destroyers, including Meteor dispersed from their patrol positions after hearing the noise of the engagement, allowing the German ships to slip through. One German straggler, S50 encountered a British destroyer patrol and sank the destroyer Simoom before escaping. On 29 January 1917, as a response to intelligence of a sortie of units of the German High Seas Fleet, (in fact the German light cruiser Graudenz with torpedo boats of II and IX Torpedo-Boat Flotilla sortied to the Hoofden), Melpomene was one of 12 destroyers led by the flotilla leader Grenville ordered to patrol between Lowestoft and Harwich to guard against German raids. The British destroyers saw nothing, although several British submarines on patrol in the North Sea sighted German torpedo boats, and E29 unsuccessfully attacked four torpedo boats.

Melpomene joined the 6th Destroyer Flotilla of the Dover Patrol on 1 March 1917. On 23 March 1917, Melpomene was returning to Britain in company with the destroyers Laforey, Laertes and Lark after escorting transports from Folkestone to Dieppe, when Laforey struck a mine and quickly sank, with only 18 of the 76 aboard surviving. On 8 June 1917, the patrol boat P.50 attacked a suspected submarine off Cap Gris-Nez with depth charges, bringing up large quantities of oil. Melpomene and Mansfield joined in the search for the submarine two hours after P.50's attack, and noted an oil slick several miles long, and that oil was still coming to the surface. P50 was credited with "possibly destroying" the submarine.

On the night of 14/15 February 1918, Melpomene, together with the destroyers Termagant, Zubian and Amazon was patrolling on the East Barrage Patrol, one of two standing patrols protecting the Dover Barrage, while two more carried out the West Barrage Patrol and three more destroyers and a light cruiser were on standby in the Downs when seven German destroyers, in two groups attacked the Dover Barrage. The Germans sank one trawler and seven drifters while severely damaging a further one trawler, five drifters and the minesweeper Newbury.

One of the German groups encountered Melpomene's group and was spotted by Amazon. Amazon challenged the Germans, three times, but despite receiving no response, still assumed they were friendly ships, allowing the Germans to escaped unhindered. Melpomene took part in the Raid on Zeebrugge on 23 April 1918, escorting Motor Launches laying smokescreens. While the attack on Zeebrugge was partially successful, with the entrance to the Zeebrugge docks partially obstructed by blockships, the parallel raid on Ostend was a failure, and a second attempt to block Ostend was made on 9/10 May. Melpomene formed part of the escort force for this mission, which again was unsuccessful, with the blockship Vindictive not blocking the entrance channel to the locks.

At the end of the war, Melpomene was in the process of transferring to the 21st Destroyer Flotilla of the Grand Fleet, but by February had returned to the 6th Flotilla, and by March was in reserve at the Nore. She was sold for scrap to the shipbreaker Ward on 9 May 1921 and was broken up at their New Holland, Lincolnshire yard.

== Pennant numbers ==
Pennant number	Date
H09	September 1915
H76	January 1918
D50	September 1918

== Bibliography ==
- Bacon, Reginald (1919). The Dover Patrol 1915–1917: Volume I. London: Hutchinson & Co. OCLC 252062093.
- Bacon, Reginald (1919). The Dover Patrol 1915–1917: Volume II. London: Hutchinson & Co. OCLC 867981501.
- Dittmar, F. J.; Colledge, J. J. (1972). British Warships 1914–1919. Shepperton, UK: Ian Allan. ISBN 0-7110-0380-7.
- Dorling, Taprell (1932). Endless Story: Being an account of the work of the Destroyers, Flotilla-Leaders, Torpedo-Boats and Patrol Boats in the Great War. London: Hodder and Stoughton.
- Fock, Harald (1989). Z-Vor!: Internationale Entwicklung und Kriegseinsätze von Zerstörern und Torpedobooten: 1914 bis 1939 (in German). Herford, Germany: Koelers Verlagsgesellschaft mbH. ISBN 3-7822-0207-4.
- Friedman, Norman (2009). British Destroyers: From Earliest Days to the Second World War. Barnsley, UK: Seaforth Publishing. ISBN 978-1-84832-049-9.
- Gardiner, Robert; Gray, Randal, eds. (1985). Conway's All The World's Fighting Ships 1906–1921. London: Conway Maritime Press. ISBN 0-85177-245-5.
- Grant, Robert M. (1964). U-Boats Destroyed: The Effect of Anti-Submarine Warfare 1914–1918. London: Putnam.
- Karau, Mark D. (2014). The Naval Flank of the Western Front: The German MarineKorps Flandern 1914–1918. Barnsley, UK: Seaforth Publishing. ISBN 978-1-84832-231-8.
- Lyon, David (1977). "The First Town Class 1908–31: Part 1". Warship. Vol. 1, no. 1. pp. 48–58. ISBN 0-85177-132-7.
- McBride, Keith (1991). "British 'M' Class Destroyers of 1913–14". In Gardiner, Robert (ed.). Warship 1991. London: Conway Maritime Press. pp. 34–49. ISBN 0-85177-582-9.
- Massie, Rober K. (2007). Castles of Steel: Britain, Germany and the Winning of the War at Sea. London: Vintage Books. ISBN 978-0-099-52378-9.}
- Monograph No. 30: Home Waters Part V: From July to October 1915 (PDF). Naval Staff Monographs (Historical). Vol. XIV. Naval Staff, Training and Staff Duties Division. 1926.
- Monograph No. 31: Home Waters—Part VI.: From October 1915 to May 1916 (PDF). Naval Staff Monographs (Historical). Vol. XV. The Naval Staff, Training and Staff Duties Division. 1926.
- Monograph No. 33: Home Waters Part VII: From June 1916 to November 1916 (PDF). Naval Staff Monographs (Historical). Vol. XVII. Naval Staff, Training and Staff Duties Division. 1927.
- Monograph No. 34: Home Waters Part VIII: December 1916 to April 1917 (PDF). Naval Staff Monographs (Historical). Vol. XVIII. Naval Staff, Training and Staff Duties Division. 1933.
- Monograph No. 35: Home Waters Part IX: 1st May 1917 to 31st July 1917 (PDF). Naval Staff Monographs (Historical). Vol. XIX. Naval Staff, Training and Staff Duties Division. 1939.
- Newbolt, Henry (1928). Naval Operations: Volume IV. History of the Great War. London: Longmans, Green and Co.
- Newbolt, Henry (1931). Naval Operations: Vol. V. History of the Great War. London: Longmans, Green and Co.
- Terry, C. Sanford, ed. (1919). Ostend and Zeebrugge: April 23:May 10 1918: The Dispatches of Vice-Admiral Roger Keyes K.C.B, K.V.C.O and other Narratives of the Operations. Oxford University Press.
