= HMS Murray (1914) =

Destroyer of the Royal Navy

History

United Kingdom
- Name: HMS Murray
- Builder: Palmers Shipbuilding & Iron Company, Hebburn on Tyne
- Laid down: 4 December 1913
- Launched: 6 August 1914
- Completed: December 1914
- Fate: Sold for scrap 9 May 1921

General characteristics
- Class & type: Admiralty M-class destroyer
- Displacement: 1,100 long tons (1,118 t) full load
- Length: 273 ft 4 in (83.31 m)
- Beam: 26 ft 8 in (8.13 m)
- Draught: 8 ft 6 in (2.59 m)
- Propulsion: 3 shafts, steam turbines, 25,000 shp (18,642 kW)
- Speed: 34 knots (63 km/h; 39 mph)
- Range: 2,100 nmi (3,900 km; 2,400 mi)
- Complement: 80
- Armament: 3 × QF 4 in (100 mm) Mark IV guns; 2 × twin 21 inch (533 mm) torpedo tubes

HMS Murray was a Royal Navy Admiralty M-class destroyer. Ordered before the outbreak of war, she was therefore the first of her class to enter operation during the early months of the First World War. She was also the first vessel of the Royal Navy to carry the name HMS Murray.

== Construction and design ==
Murray was one of two Admiralty M-class destroyers ordered from Palmers Shipbuilding & Iron Company as part of the 1913–1914 Construction Programme for the Royal Navy. (Note: The other Palmers-built destroyer was Myngs. Four more Admiralty M-class ships were ordered from other shipbuilders at the same time, while seven builder's specials (two from Hawthorn Leslie, two from Thornycroft and three from Yarrow) which did not follow the standard design were also ordered as part of the same programme.) The M-class was an improved version of the earlier Laforey-class destroyer, required to reach the higher speed of 36 knots (67 km/h; 41 mph) in order to counter rumoured German fast destroyers. Murray was laid down at Palmers' Hebburn on Tyne shipyard on 4 December 1913, launched on 6 August 1914 and completed in December 1914, at a price of £115,260.

Murray was 273 feet 4 inches (83.31 m) long overall and 265 feet 0 inches (80.77 m) between perpendiculars, with a beam of 26 feet 8 inches (8.13 m) and a draught of 8 feet 6 inches (2.59 m). Displacement was 900 long tons (910 t) legend and about 1,100 long tons (1,100 t) deep load. Four Yarrow three-drum boilers fed two sets of Parsons steam turbines rated at 25,000 shaft horsepower (19,000 kW), giving a normal maximum speed of 34 knots (63 km/h; 39 mph). Up to 228 tons of oil could be carried, giving an endurance of 2,100 nautical miles (3,900 km; 2,400 mi) at 15 knots (28 km/h; 17 mph). The ship's crew consisted of 80 officers and men. Armament consisted of three QF 4-inch (102 mm) Mk IV guns mounted on the ships centreline, and four 21 inch (533 mm) torpedo tubes in two twin mounts.

== Service ==
The destroyer formed part of the Harwich Force from commissioning until 1917. On 31 January 1915 Murray was one of seven M-class destroyers (Note: Murray, Miranda, Manley, Morris, Minos, Matchless and Milne) sent to Sheerness to escort minelaying operations at the east end of the English Channel by the minesweeper Paris. Minelaying operations started on 4 February and continued to 16 February, although the M-class destroyers, including Murray, were relieved by destroyers of the 3rd Destroyer Flotilla on 9 February, allowing them to return to Harwich. Late in March Murray was involved in anti-submarine patrols off the Dutch coast. On 23 March 1915, Murray took part in an attempted raid by seaplanes from the seaplane carrier Empress, escorted by the Harwich Force, against a radio station at Norddiech on the German North Sea coast. The attempt was abandoned due to heavy fog which caused the cruiser Undaunted and destroyer Landrail to collide, badly damaging both ships. Murray helped to escort the damaged Undaunted back to HMNB Chatham for repair. (Note: While Dorling and Conway's All The World's Fighting Ships states that the collision occurred in April 1915, Jones, when discussing attempted seaplane raids, notes that an attempted raid took place on 23 March, while Kindell notes three deaths from a collision between Undaunted and Landrail on 24 March.) In June–July 1915, the 10th Destroyer Flotilla, including Murray, as a result of German submarine activity in the English Channel and south-western approaches, was deployed in escorting troop transports through the south-west approaches.

On 23 August 1915, the Dover Patrol bombarded the German-held port of Zeebrugge, with Murray one of twelve destroyers from the Harwich Force attached to the Dover Patrol for this action. While at the time, the British believed that the bombardment was successful, in fact, little damage was done. On 30 October Murray took part in a sweep by the Harwich Force of the German Bight during which the Swedish steamer Osterland was stopped and sent to the Humber for investigation of a suspicious cargo of iron ore. On 8 November the Harwich Force was deployed in support of Operation DZ, where Princess Margaret and Angora laid 850 mines in the German Bight. On the return journey, the destroyer Matchless had her stern blown off by a German mine off Orfordness on the evening of 9 November and was taken under tow by Murray until relieved by a light cruiser from Harwich.

On the morning of 21 February 1916, Murray left Harwich as part of the Harwich Force to cover minesweeping operations in the North Sea. Later that day she collided with the destroyer Milne, receiving sufficient damage that she had to be sent to Chatham for repair. (This operation was plagued with accidents – the destroyers Lark and Llewellyn had collided on leaving Harwich on the afternoon of 20 February, while the leader Tipperary had run aground when leaving harbour on the morning of 21 February.) Murray took part in another attempted raid by seaplanes on 24–25 March 1916, this time launched by HMS Vindex against a German Zeppelin base believed to be at Hoyer in Schleswig-Holstein. Most of the Harwich Force was deployed as escort for Vindex. Only two out of five seaplanes dispatched returned, reporting that the Zeppelin base was in fact at Tondern, but that they were unable to attack the base. Tyrwhitt sent 10 of his destroyers, including Murray to search for the missing seaplanes. No sign of the missing seaplanes was found (they had ditched due to engine trouble, and their crews captured by the Germans) but the force encountered two German patrol boats (Braunschweig and Otto Rudolf) which they sank. When picking up survivors from the two patrol boats, Laverock rammed the destroyer Medusa. While damage to Laverock was confined to her bows, Medusa had been holed in her engine room and was taken in tow by the flotilla leader Lightfoot, but due to the severe weather, Medusa eventually had to be scuttled. During the return journey of Tyrwhitt's force, the cruisers Cleopatra and Undaunted also collided, badly damaging Undaunted, shortly after Cleopatra rammed and sunk the German destroyer G 194.

From 24 April 1916, the Dover Patrol carried out a large-scale operation off the Belgian coast to lay mines and nets, in an attempt to limit use of the ports of Ostend and Zeebrugge to German U-boats. Murray was one of twelve destroyers of the Harwich Force that took part in escorting the operations. On the afternoon of 24 April, three German torpedo boats attempted to interfere with the drifters laying the nets off Zeebrugge, and Murray, together with Milne, Medea and Melpomene, engaged the three torpedo boats, which retreated towards Zeebrugge with the four British destroyers in pursuit. The British destroyers came under heavy fire from German shore batteries. Murray was hit in the forecastle by a single 150 mm shell that failed to explode, while Melpomene was hit in the engine room and lost power. Milne attempted to take Melpomene under tow, but fouled her port propeller with the tow cable, so Medea went to assist with the tow. The three German torpedo boats then returned to attack the British ships, with Medea hit three times by German shells, but were driven off by 12-inch fire from the monitor Prince Eugene. The minefield probably caused the loss of one U-Boat, UB-13, although at the time it was thought that four or five German submarines had been sunk.

Murray transferred to the Sixth Destroyer Flotilla of the Dover Patrol on 5 June 1917. (Note: Some sources suggest that Murray, together with the rest of the pre-war M-class, served in the Mediterranean from 1917 to 1918, but Bacon says that she remained with the Dover Patrol, and contemporary Navy Lists state that Murray remained with the Dover Patrol and did not serve in the Mediterranean.) She collided with the British destroyer HMS Vehement on 14 January 1918. An investigation attributed the accident to an error in judgment by Vehement′s lieutenant in command.

On the night of 14/15 February 1918, Murray was on patrol in The Downs along with the light cruiser Attentive and the destroyers Crusader and Nugent, with a further six destroyers on patrol in the Channel itself, when seven German torpedo boats (equivalent to British destroyers) attacked the Dover Barrage. While Admiral Roger Keyes, commander of the Dover Patrol, ordered the destroyers in The Downs to try to intercept the German ships, none of the defensive forces managed to interfere with the German attack, which sank one trawler and seven drifters while severely damaging a further one trawler, five drifters and one minesweeper. At the end of the war, Murray was in the process of transferring to the 21st Destroyer Flotilla based at Rosyth in Scotland. By February 1919, however, she was listed as having returned to the Sixth Flotilla.

By this time the M-class destroyers were worn-out, and by May 1919, Murray was in reserve at Portsmouth. She was sold to Ward for breaking up at their Briton Ferry works on 9 May 1921.

== Bibliography ==
- Bacon, Reginald (1919). The Dover Patrol 1915–1917: Volume I. London: Hutchinson & Co. OCLC 252062093.
- Bacon, Reginald (1919). The Dover Patrol 1915–1917: Volume II. London: Hutchinson & Co. OCLC 867981501.
- Corbett, Julian S. (1923). History of the Great War: Naval Operations: Volume III. London: Longmans, Green & Co. OCLC 3759388.
- Dittmar, F.G; Colledge, J.J. (1972). British Warships 1914–1919. Shepperton, UK: Ian Allan. ISBN 0-7110-0380-7.
- Dorling, Taprell (1932). Endless Story: Being an account of the work of the Destroyers, Flotilla-Leaders, Torpedo-Boats and Patrol Boats in the Great War. London: Hodder and Stoughton.
- Friedman, Norman (2009). British Destroyers: From Earliest Days to the Second World War. Barnsley, UK: Seaforth Publishing. ISBN 978-1-84832-049-9.
- Gardiner, Robert; Gray, Randal, eds. (1985). Conway's All The World's Fighting Ships 1906–1921. London: Conway Maritime Press. ISBN 0-85177-245-5.
- Grant, Robert M. (1964). U-Boats Destroyed: The Effect of Anti-Submarine Warfare 1914–1918. London: Putnam. OCLC 4093996.
- Jones, H. A. (1928). History of the Great War:The War in the Air: Being the Story of the Part Played in the Great War by the Royal Air Force: Vol. II. Oxford: Clarendon Press.
- Karau, Mark D. (2014). The Naval Flank of the Western Front: The German MarineKorps Flandern 1914–1918. Barnsley, UK: Seaforth Publishing. ISBN 978-1-84832-231-8.
- McBride, Keith (1991). "British 'M' Class Destroyers of 1913–14". In Gardiner, Robert (ed.). Warship 1991. London: Conway Maritime Press. pp. 34–49. ISBN 0-85177-582-9.
- Monograph No. 18: The Dover Command: Vol. I (PDF). Naval Staff Monographs (Historical). Vol. VI. The Naval Staff, Training and Staff Duties Division. 1922.
- Monograph No. 29: Home Waters—Part IV.: From February to July 1915 (PDF). Naval Staff Monographs (Historical). Vol. XIII. The Naval Staff, Training and Staff Duties Division. 1925.
- Monograph No. 30: Home Waters—Part V.: From August 1915 to October 1915 (PDF). Naval Staff Monographs (Historical). Vol. XIV. The Naval Staff, Training and Staff Duties Division. 1926.
- Monograph No. 31: Home Waters—Part VI.: From October 1915 to May 1916 (PDF). Naval Staff Monographs (Historical). Vol. XV. The Naval Staff, Training and Staff Duties Division. 1926.
