= HMS Nugent =

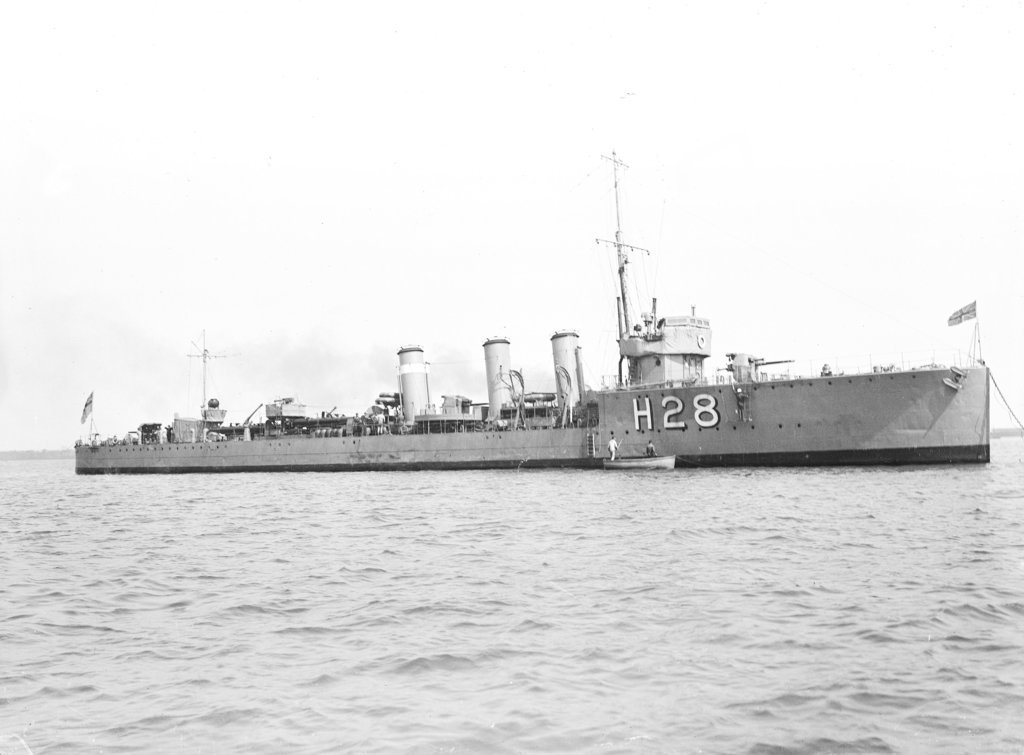
- Sister ship Orpheus

History

United Kingdom
- Name: Nugent
- Namesake: Sir Charles Nugent
- Ordered: November 1914
- Builder: Palmers, Hebburn
- Laid down: April 1915
- Launched: 23 January 1917
- Completed: April 1917
- Out of service: 9 May 1921
- Fate: Sold to be broken up

General characteristics
- Class & type: Admiralty M-class destroyer
- Displacement: 971 long tons (987 t) (normal)
- Length: 273 ft 4 in (83.3 m) (o/a); 265 feet (80.8 m) (p.p.)
- Beam: 26 ft 8 in (8.1 m)
- Draught: 8 ft 11 in (2.7 m)
- Installed power: 3 Yarrow boilers, 25,000 shp (19,000 kW)
- Propulsion: Parsons steam turbines, 3 shafts
- Speed: 34 knots (63 km/h; 39 mph)
- Range: 2,530 nmi (4,690 km; 2,910 mi) at 15 kn (28 km/h; 17 mph)
- Complement: 80
- Armament: 3 × single QF 4-inch (102 mm) guns; 2 × single 1-pdr 37 mm (1.5 in) AA guns; 2 × twin 21 in (533 mm) torpedo tubes

HMS Nugent was an Admiralty M-class destroyer which served in the Royal Navy during the First World War. The vessel had a largely uneventful career. Nugent was one of 85 M class, an improvement on those of the preceding L class, capable of higher speed. The destroyer was launched in 1917 and joined the Sixth Destroyer Flotilla of the Dover Patrol, operating in the Strait of Dover. The vessel was involved in attacks by German destroyers on Dover and the Dover Barrage in 1917 and 1918, but did not have contact with the enemy vessels, inflicted no damage and received no hits. The ship then provided part of the escort to the blockship Vindictive in the Second Ostend Raid but again saw no action. After the Armistice, Nugent was placed in reserve before being sold to be broken up in 1921.

== Design and development ==
Nugent was one of the 22 Admiralty M-class destroyers ordered by the British Admiralty in November 1914 as part of the First War Programme. The M class was an improved version of the earlier L class, required to reach a higher speed in order to counter rumoured new German fast destroyers. The remit was to have a maximum speed of 36 knots (67 km/h; 41 mph) and, although ultimately the destroyers fell short of that ambition in service, the extra performance that was achieved was valued by the navy and 85 M-class destroyers were eventually built. It transpired that the German warships did not exist.

The destroyer had a length of 265 ft (80.8 m) between perpendiculars and 273 ft 4 in (83.3 m) overall, with a beam of 26 ft 8 in (8.1 m) and draught of 8 ft 11 in (2.7 m). Displacement was 971 long tons (987 t) normal. Power was provided by three Yarrow boilers feeding Brown-Curtiss rated at 23,000 shaft horsepower (17,000 kW), driving three shafts and exhausting through three funnels. Design speed was 34 knots (63 km/h; 39 mph). A total of 228 long tons (232 t) of oil was carried. Design range was 2,530 nautical miles (4,690 km; 2,910 mi) at 15 knots (28 km/h; 17 mph), but actual endurance in service was less; sister ship Murray had a range of 2,240 nautical miles (4,150 km; 2,580 mi) at 15 knots (28 km/h; 17 mph).

Nugent had a main armament consisting of three single QF 4-inch (102 mm) Mk IV guns on the centreline, with one on the forecastle, one aft on a raised platform and one between the middle and aft funnels. Torpedo armament consisted of two twin torpedo tubes for 21 in (533 mm) torpedoes located aft of the funnels. Two single 1-pounder 37 mm (1.5 in) "pom-pom" anti-aircraft guns were carried. The anti-aircraft guns were later replaced by 2-pdr 40 mm (1.6 in) "pom-pom" guns. The ship had a complement of 80 officers and ratings.

== Construction and career ==
Laid down by Palmers Shipbuilding and Iron Company of Hebburn in April 1915, Nugent was launched on 23 January 1917 and completed during April that same year. The vessel was the only vessel in the Royal Navy to be named after Admiral of the Fleet Sir Charles Nugent. The destroyer joined the Dover Patrol as part of the Sixth Destroyer Flotilla.

Almost immediately, Nugent was in action. British naval traffic in the Strait of Dover had increased dramatically, particularly with the increasing numbers of convoys ferrying troops across to France that needed protecting. On 20 April, the vessel was on a patrol of the strait leading a division of destroyers including Amazon, Matchless and Morris. Towards the end of the day, they approached the Dover Barrage, a line of defences, including naval mines and nets set up by the Royal Navy across the strait to deter German ships and submarines. However, in the middle of night, the destroyer observed flashes of what might have been gunfire to the west of the barrage. It proved to be a flotilla of German destroyers that subsequently attacked Dover. As they fled, they were attacked by the flotilla leader Broke and Swift, which sank two of their number. Nugent was not involved in the sinking. On 22 September, the destroyer saw a German force of four destroyers and seven seaplanes, but they did not attack. Instead, the ship pulled the crew of one seaplanes that ditched in the sea out of the water. Three days later, while on another patrol, the destroyer was damaged by mines in the barrage.

On 14 February 1918, Nugent was again in service on patrol alongside the scout cruiser Attentive and destroyers Crusader and Murray off the coast of Kent. Two German destroyers attacked the minesweeper Newbury and three other vessels, but fled before Nugent and the rest of the division arrived. On 22 May, the destroyer escorted the blockship Vindictive in the Second Ostend Raid, which led to the partial blocking of the channel. At the end of the war, Nugent was part of the 21st Destroyer Flotilla.

After the Armistice that ended the war, the Royal Navy returned to a peacetime level of strength and both the number of ships and personnel needed to be reduced to save money. The destroyer was transferred to reserve at Portsmouth. However, the harsh conditions of wartime operations, particularly the combination of high speed and the poor weather that is typical of the North Sea, exacerbated by the fact that the hull was not galvanised, meant that the ship was soon worn out. Nugent was declared superfluous to operational requirements, retired, and, on 9 May 1921, sold to Ward and broken up at Hayle.

== Pennant numbers ==
| Pennant number | Date |
|---|---|
| G17 | September 1915 |
| F46 | January 1917 |
| F54 | January 1918 |
| D58 | September 1918 |
| G47 | January 1919 |
