= HMS Myngs (1914) =

British M-Class destroyer

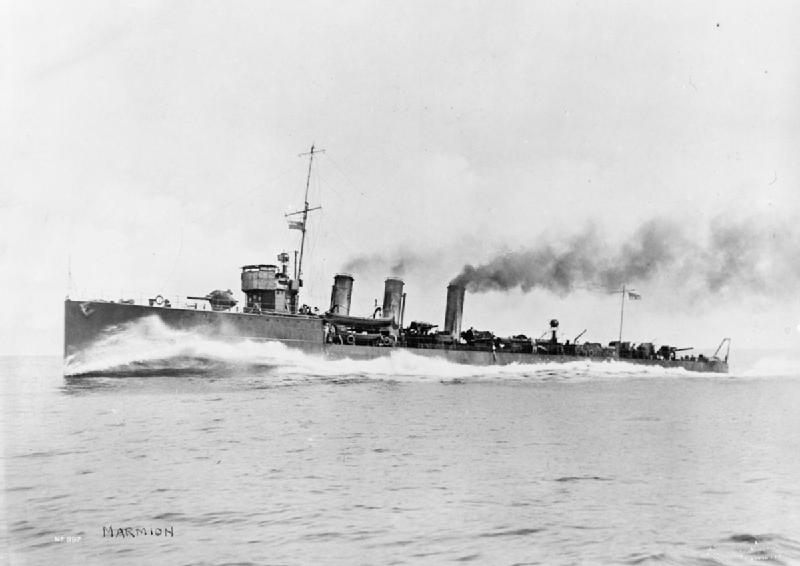
- Sister ship HMS Marmion

History

United Kingdom
- Name: HMS Myngs
- Namesake: Vice-Admiral Sir Christopher Myngs
- Ordered: May 1913
- Builder: Palmers, Hebburn
- Laid down: 31 December 1913
- Launched: 24 September 1914
- Completed: March 1915
- Out of service: 9 May 1921
- Fate: Sold to be broken up

General characteristics
- Class & type: Admiralty M-class destroyer
- Displacement: 971 long tons (987 t) (normal)
- Length: 273 ft 4 in (83.3 m) (o/a); 265 feet (80.8 m) (p.p.)
- Beam: 26 ft 9 in (8.2 m)
- Draught: 8 ft 6 in (2.6 m)
- Installed power: 3 Yarrow boilers, 25,000 shp (19,000 kW)
- Propulsion: Parsons steam turbines, 3 shafts
- Speed: 34 knots (63 km/h; 39 mph)
- Range: 2,530 nmi (4,690 km; 2,910 mi) at 15 kn (28 km/h; 17 mph)
- Complement: 80
- Armament: 3 × single QF 4-inch (102 mm) Mark IV guns; 2 × single 1-pdr 37 mm (1.5 in) AA guns; 2 × twin 21 in (533 mm) torpedo tubes

HMS Myngs was an Admiralty M-class destroyer which served in the Royal Navy during the First World War. The M-class ships were an improvement on those of the preceding L class, capable of higher speeds. Myngs, the first ship to enter Royal Navy service to be named after Vice-Admiral Sir Christopher Myngs, was launched in 1914. initially serving as part of the Grand Fleet, the vessel was involved in escorting troop ships like RMS Mauretania before being transferred to the Harwich Force in 1915. Placed within the Dover Patrol, the destroyer continued to operate as an escort, as well as taking part in sorties against German warships. The vessel formed part of the cover for monitors including Erebus and Terror for an attack on Zeebrugge in 1918. Towards the end of the war, Myngs sank the monitor Glatton, which was alight following an internal explosion, with a single torpedo. After the Armistice, the destroyer was placed in reserve and subsequently sold to be broken up in 1921.

== Design and development ==
Myngs was one of the initial six Admiralty M-class destroyers ordered by the British Admiralty in May 1913 as part of the 1913–14 Naval Programme, one of the last destroyers to be ordered before the outbreak of the First World War. The M class was an improved version of the earlier L-class, required to reach a higher speed in order to counter the rumoured new German fast destroyers. The remit was to have a maximum speed of 36 knots (67 km/h; 41 mph) and, although the eventual design did not achieve this, the greater performance of the M class was appreciated by the navy. It transpired that the German ships did not exist.

The destroyer had a length of 265 ft (80.8 m) between perpendiculars and 273 ft 4 in (83.3 m) overall, with a beam of 26 ft 9 in (8.2 m). Displacement was 971 long tons (987 t) normal. Design draught was 8 ft 6 in (2.6 m). Power was provided by three Yarrow boilers feeding Parsons steam turbines rated at 25,000 shaft horsepower (19,000 kW) and driving three shafts, to give a design speed of 34 knots (63 km/h; 39 mph). Three funnels were fitted. A total of 228 long tons (232 t) of oil were carried. Design range was 2,530 nautical miles (4,690 km; 2,910 mi) at 15 knots (28 km/h; 17 mph), but actual endurance in service was less; sister ship Murray had a range of 2,240 nautical miles (4,150 km; 2,580 mi) at 15 knots (28 km/h; 17 mph). The ship had a complement of 80 officers and ratings.

Myngs had a main armament consisting of three single QF 4-inch (102 mm) Mk IV guns on the centreline, with one on the forecastle, one aft on a raised platform and one between the middle and aft funnels. Torpedo armament consisted of two twin mounts for 21 in (533 mm) torpedoes located aft of the funnels. Fire control included a single Dumaresq and a Vickers range clock. Two single 1-pounder 37 mm (1.5 in) "pom-pom" anti-aircraft guns were carried. The anti-aircraft guns were later replaced by 2-pdr 40 mm (1.6 in) "pom-pom" guns. For anti-submarine warfare, Myngs was equipped with two chutes for two depth charges. The number of depth charges carried increased as the war progressed and, by 1918, the vessel was carrying between 30 and 50 depth charges.

== Construction and career ==
Myngs was laid down by Palmers Shipbuilding and Iron Company at their yard in Hebburn on 31 December 1913, was launched on 24 September the following year and was completed in March 1915. The destroyer cost £113,524. The vessel was the first to be named after the naval officer Vice-Admiral Sir Christopher Myngs. Myngs was deployed as part of the Grand Fleet, joining the newly formed Tenth Destroyer Flotilla.

The destroyer took part in a wide range of activities during the war, usually alongside other members of the flotilla. For example, the flotilla was involved in escorting ships, and Myngs escorted the troop ships RMS Aquitania and RMS Mauretania on their departures from Liverpool on 18 May 1915 and an ammunition ship between Queenstown and Avonmouth on 14 June the same year. By the following month, a routine developed of escorting transports departing Avonmouth and Devonport, then bringing in transports that had crossed from Canada. By October, the destroyer, along with the rest of the flotilla, had been transferred to the Harwich Force.

On arriving in Dover, the destroyer found there was less activity than expected. In fact, since 10 April 1915, the German navy had decided to no longer send warships into the Strait of Dover and the threats to shipping were substantially reduced. This gave time for other types of operations to be considered. On 25 April 1916, the flotilla engaged German battlecruisers returning from their bombardment of Yarmouth and Lowestoft, but the destroyer did not record any hits. On 14 August, the destroyer was to have supported a major minelaying expedition to take place off the Ems, but this was reduced to a much smaller operation and Myngs was no longer required. The ship remained part of the Tenth Flotilla. However, the amount of sailing increased. By the end of the year, British naval traffic in the Strait of Dover had increased dramatically and the flotilla was heavily involved in escorting convoys across to France as threats from German submarines also increased.

On 10 February 1917, Myngs was involved in an unsuccessful search for a German minelaying submarine, possibly UC-4. On 17 March, the destroyer was part of the Dover Patrol, but held in reserve against a German attack. This proved useful when, on 21 April, German destroyers of the 3rd Torpedo-Boat Flotilla attacked the Kent coast and were in turn engaged by British destroyers in an action that became known as the Battle of Dover Strait (1917). Myngs was dispatched, the last of the British destroyers deployed in the action. The ensuing battle led to the destruction of two of the German vessels and dissuaded the German fleet from attacking the Strait of Dover for many months. By this time, the Royal Navy force in Dover had grown to include 13 monitors and 43 destroyers. Myngs was part of the Sixth Destroyer Flotilla.

The destroyer again sailed against German shipping on 20 March 1918. Although still based at Dover, Myngs had been sent by Allied command in Dunkirk to patrol the east barrage in the Dover Straits in response to news of German ships being spotted there. No action took place on that occasion. After an aborted attempt on 11 April, the vessel escorted the monitors Erebus and Terror that attacked Zeebrugge on 18 April. The plan included the sinking of blockships to impede the flow of German submarines leaving the port. Although the operation did not meet the expectations of the Admiralty and the port remained open, the bombardment was achieved without interference by enemy warships or the loss of any British vessels. On 11 September, the monitor Glatton exploded while in Dover harbour. At great risk, the crew of Myngs launched a torpedo at the stricken vessel which successfully caused the ship to capsize, extinguishing the flames. Had the ship continued to burn, this could have led to many deaths.

After the Armistice of 11 November 1918 that ended the war, the Royal Navy returned to a peacetime level of strength and both the number of ships and personnel needed to be reduced to save money. Myngs was declared superfluous to operational requirements. The vessel was initially placed in reserve at the Nore but on 5 January 1920, the destroyer was passed to care and maintenance. This situation did not last long. The harsh conditions of wartime operations, particularly the combination of high speed and the poor weather that is typical of the North Sea, exacerbated by the fact that the hull was not galvanised, meant that the ship was worn out. On 9 May 1921, Myngs was sold to Thos. W. Ward to be broken up in Rainham.

== Pennant numbers ==
Pennant number	Date
HA5	August 1915
H87	January 1918
D41	September 1918
G88	January 1919
