= HMS Manly (1914) =

Destroyer of the Royal Navy

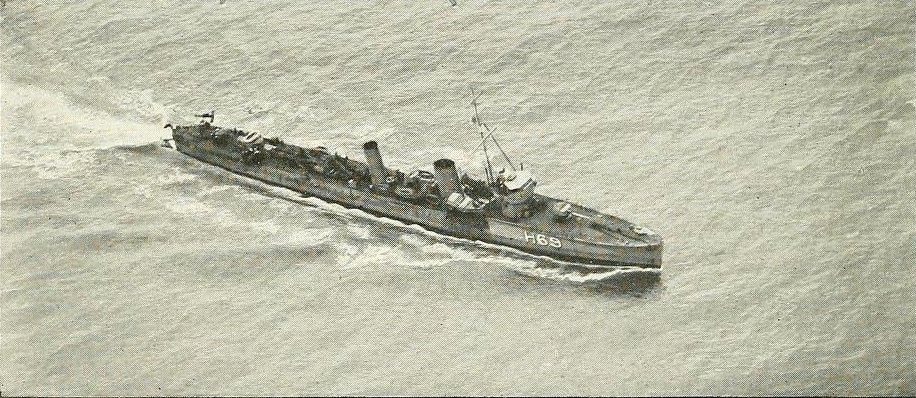
- Aerial view of HMS Manly

History

United Kingdom
- Name: HMS Manly
- Builder: Yarrow, Scotstoun
- Laid down: 12 May 1913
- Launched: 12 October 1914
- Completed: November 1914
- Fate: Sold October 1920

General characteristics
- Class & type: Yarrow M-class destroyer
- Displacement: 993 long tons (1,009 t) deep load
- Length: 269 ft 6 in (82.14 m) oa
- Beam: 25 ft 7 1/2 in (7.81 m)
- Draught: 10 ft 8 1/2 in (3.26 m)
- Installed power: 23,000 shp (17,000 kW)
- Propulsion: 3× Yarrow boilers; Brown-Curtis steam turbines; 2 shafts
- Speed: 35 kn (40 mph; 65 km/h)
- Complement: 76
- Armament: 3 × 4-inch (102 mm) guns; 2 × 2-pounder (40 mm) guns; 4 × 21 inch (533 mm) torpedo tubes

HMS Manly (Note: Sometimes listed as Manley.) was a Yarrow M-class destroyer of the British Royal Navy. Built by the Scottish shipbuilder Yarrow between 1913 and 1914, Manly served during the First World War. She formed part of the Harwich Force in the early years of the war, and then later in the English Channel as part of the Dover Patrol taking part in the Zeebrugge Raid in 1918. She survived the war, and was sold for scrap in 1920.

== Design and construction ==
For the 1913–1914 shipbuilding programme for the Royal Navy, the British Admiralty, prompted by the First Lord of the Admiralty, Winston Churchill, had a requirement for faster destroyers than those built in previous years, in order to match reported German ships. They hoped for a speed of 36 knots (41 mph; 67 km/h), but otherwise, the requirements were similar to those that gave rise to the previous year's L-class. The Admiralty first ordered two builder's specials each from the experienced destroyer builders Yarrow, Thornycroft and Hawthorn Leslie, to the builder's own designs, with another ship ordered to Yarrow's design in May 1913, and then ordered six to the standard admiralty design.

The Yarrow M-class destroyers were 269 feet 6 inches (82.14 m) long overall and 260 feet 3 inches (79.32 m) between perpendiculars, with a beam of 25 feet 7 1/2 inches (7.81 m) and a draught of 10 feet 8 1/2 inches (3.26 m). Displacement was 879 long tons (893 t) normal and 993 long tons (1,009 t) deep load. Three Yarrow water-tube boilers fed steam to Brown-Curtis impulse steam turbines, driving two propeller shafts. The machinery was rated at 23,000 shaft horsepower (17,000 kW) giving a speed of 35 knots (40 mph; 65 km/h).

The ships were armed with three 4-inch (102 mm) QF Mk 4 guns, together with two 2-pounder pom-pom anti-aircraft autocannons. (Note: It was originally planned to fit 1-pounder pom-poms, but when built the ships were fitted with 1 1/2-pounder (37-mm) pom-poms which were later replaced by 2-pounder (40-mm) guns.) Two twin 21-inch (533mm torpedo tubes were fitted. The ships had a crew of 79. (Note: Friedman gives a crew of 76.)

Manly, the third of the Yarrow-built specials, was laid down at Yarrow's Scotstoun shipyard on 12 May 1913 and launched on 12 October 1914. She reached a speed of 33.88 knots (38.99 mph; 62.75 km/h) during sea trials and was completed in November 1914. Contract price was £118,221.

== Service ==
Manly joined the Harwich Force on completion, which operated in the North Sea and could reinforce the Grand Fleet or forces in the English Channel as required. On 31 January 1915, Manly was one of seven destroyers of the Harwich Force dispatched to Sheerness to make part in minelaying operations east of the Straits of Dover to restrict the movements of German U-Boats. They continued escorting the minelayer Paris until 9 February. On 28 March, four destroyers of the Harwich force (Laurel, Liberty, Leonidas and Lucifer carried out an anti-submarine sweep off the Dutch coast. When a submarine was sighted, six more destroyers of the Harwich Force, including Manly, were sent to reinforce the patrol, but shortly after the two groups of destroyers met up, the force was recalled as radio intercepts indicated that German battlecruisers were about to sortie.

On 13 June 1915, the 10th Destroyer Flotilla, including Manly was ordered to Avonmouth for operations in the South-West Approaches, and in particular, to escort troopships carrying the 13th Division to the Middle East on the initial part of their journey, with two destroyers per transport. After the 13th Division had all left, the 10th Flotilla continued on escort duties based at Devonport, escorting the ships carrying the next division to be sent to the Gallipoli campaign, the 12th Division. On 2 July 1915, Manly, together with Mentor and Miranda escorted the former ocean liner Empress of Britain, on passage from Liverpool to the Dardanelles. Manly remained with Empress of Britain until 9:00 pm on 2 July, then set course to Queenstown to refuel, after which she was to rendezvous with the other two destroyers to escort the Aquitania, another Dardanelles-bound former ocean liner. Manly ran aground in thick fog just outside Queenstown, however, leaving Aquitania with only Mentor and Miranda as escort.

On 16 August 1915, 8 destroyers of the 10th Flotilla, including Manly, escorted the minelayer Princess Margaret which was tasked with laying a minefield on the Arum Bank. The force encountered five patrolling German destroyers, and the German destroyer B98 torpedoed the destroyer Mentor, blowing off Mentor's bows, and then turned away. This caused the operation to be abandoned. Despite the damage, Mentor made it safely back to Harwich. On 23 August 1915, 12 destroyers of the Harwich Force, including Manly, were attached to the Dover patrol to cover a bombardment of the German-held Belgian port of Zeebrugge by the monitors Lord Clive, Sir John Moore and Prince Rupert. Little damage was done, and the lock gates of the port, the principal objective of the operation, were untouched. On 6 October 1915, the Harwich Force set out on a sweep off the Danish coast. The force captured 15 German fishing trawlers and sunk another on 7 October, with Manly being responsible for at least one of the captures, the West, which was later operated by the Royal Navy in the Mediterranean as the Cordwosin.

On 25 December 1915, Manly was one of eight destroyers from the Harwich Force that were ordered with the leader Nimrod to the Channel as a result of attacks by the German submarine U-24. On 24 March 1916, the Harwich Force took part in a raid by seaplanes launched by the seaplane carrier Vindex against a German airship base believed to be at Hoyer on the coast of Schleswig, with Manly sailing as part of the escort. The air attack was unsuccessful, with the airship base not being at Hoyer as thought, but at Tondern further inland. The destroyer Medusa was sunk after a collision with the destroyer Laverock, while later in the day, in an encounter with German torpedo boats, the cruiser Cleopatra rammed and sunk the German torpedo-boat G194, but was then rammed herself by the cruiser Undaunted, damaging both cruisers.

On the night of 23/24 July 1916, eight destroyers and two light cruiser of the Harwich force set out on a patrol to protect shipping passing between Britain and the Netherlands from German attack, with the force being divided into two divisions, with Manly forming part of the 1st Division, led by the cruiser Carysfort. The division sighted three German destroyers and set off in pursuit, but the German force escaped under cover of a rain squall and a heavy smoke screen. The second division, led by the cruiser Canterbury, also encountered the three German destroyers, but the German force managed to reach Zeebrugge safely.

In December 1916, Manly was one of eight destroyers of the 10th Flotilla sent with Nimrod to Dunkirk to strengthen defences in the Channel against raids by German surface forces, but on 23 January, she, along with Nimrod and five other destroyers, was ordered to take part, with the Harwich Force, in an operation to intercept a flotilla of 11 German torpedo boats that were being sent from Germany to reinforce their naval forces in Belgium. In total six light cruisers, two leaders and 16 destroyers were deployed to intercept the German force. The German force avoided Manly's group, but ran into three British light cruisers, with the torpedo-boats V69 and G41 damaged by British shellfire and collision before escaping. The torpedo boat S50, which had lost contact with the rest of the German flotilla, encountered the British destroyer Simoom and torpedoed and sunk the British ship before escaping.

Manly transferred to the Dover Patrol on 8 May 1917, and on 5 June escorted the monitors Erebus and Terror when they bombarded Ostend. The bombardment sank the submarine UC-70, and two barges, and damaged three torpedo boats. Manly was still part of the Dover Patrol in July 1917.

Manly took part in the Raid on Zeebrugge on 23 April 1918, escorting the monitors Erebus and Terror. She remained part of the Dover patrol at the end of the war.

== Disposal ==
Manly was sold for scrap to the Barking Ship Breaking Company on 26 October 1921.

== Pennant numbers ==
Pennant number	Dates
H0A	1914–January 1918
H69	January 1918–September 1918
D20	September 1918 –

== Bibliography ==
- Bacon, Reginald (1919). The Dover Patrol 1915–1917: Vol. II. London: Hutchinson & Co.
- Corbett, Julian S. (1923). Naval Operations: Volume III. History of the Great War. London: Longmans, Green and Co.
- Dittmar, F. J.; Colledge, J. J. (1972). British Warships 1914–1919. Shepperton, UK: Ian Allan. ISBN 0-7110-0380-7.
- Friedman, Norman (2009). British Destroyers: From Earliest Days to the Second World War. Barnsley, UK: Seaforth Publishing. ISBN 978-1-84832-049-9.
- Gardiner, Robert; Gray, Randal, eds. (1985). Conway's All The World's Fighting Ships 1906–1921. London: Conway Maritime Press. ISBN 0-85177-245-5.
- Karau, Mark (2014). The Naval Flank of the Western Front: The German MarineKorps Flandern 1914–1918. Barnsley, UK: Seaforth Publishing. ISBN 978-1-84832-231-8.
- McBride, Keith (1991). "British 'M' Class Destroyers of 1913–14". In Gardiner, Robert (ed.). Warship 1991. London: Conway Maritime Press. pp. 34–49. ISBN 0-85177-582-9.
- Manning, T.D. (1961). The British Destroyer. London: Putnam. OCLC 6470051.
- Monograph No. 23: Home Waters Part I: From the Outbreak of War to 27 August 1914 (PDF). Naval Staff Monographs (Historical). Vol. X. Naval Staff, Training and Staff Duties Division. 1924.
- Monograph No. 29: Home Waters Part IV: From February to July 1915 (PDF). Naval Staff Monographs (Historical). Vol. XIII. Naval Staff, Training and Staff Duties Division. 1925.
- Monograph No. 30: Home Waters Part V: From July to October 1915 (PDF). Naval Staff Monographs (Historical). Vol. XIV. Naval Staff, Training and Staff Duties Division. 1926.
- Monograph No. 31: Home Waters Part VI: From October 1915 to May 1916 (PDF). Naval Staff Monographs (Historical). Vol. XV. Naval Staff, Training and Staff Duties Division. 1926.
- Monograph No. 33: Home Waters Part VII: From June 1916 to November 1916 (PDF). Naval Staff Monographs (Historical). Vol. XVII. Naval Staff, Training and Staff Duties Division. 1927.
- Monograph No. 34: Home Waters Part VIII: December 1916 to April 1917 (PDF). Naval Staff Monographs (Historical). Vol. XVIII. Naval Staff, Training and Staff Duties Division. 1933.
- Monograph No. 35: Home Waters Part IX: 1st May 1917 to 31st July 1917 (PDF). Naval Staff Monographs (Historical). Vol. XIX. Naval Staff, Training and Staff Duties Division. 1939.
- Moore, John (1990). Jane's Fighting Ships of World War I. London: Studio Editions. ISBN 1-85170-378-0.
- Newbolt, Henry (1928). Naval Operations: Volume IV. London: Longmans, Green and Co.
- Terry, C. Sanford, ed. (1919). Ostend and Zeebrugge: April 23:May 10 1918: The Dispatches of Vice-Admiral Roger Keyes K.C.B, K.V.C.O and other Narratives of the Operations. Oxford University Press.
