= RMS Mauretania =

Two ocean liners of the Cunard Line have been named RMS Mauretania, after the ancient territory of Mauretania:

- RMS Mauretania (1906), launched in 1906 and in service until 1934
- RMS Mauretania (1938), launched in 1938 and scrapped in 1965
