= HMS Morris =

British M-Class destroyer

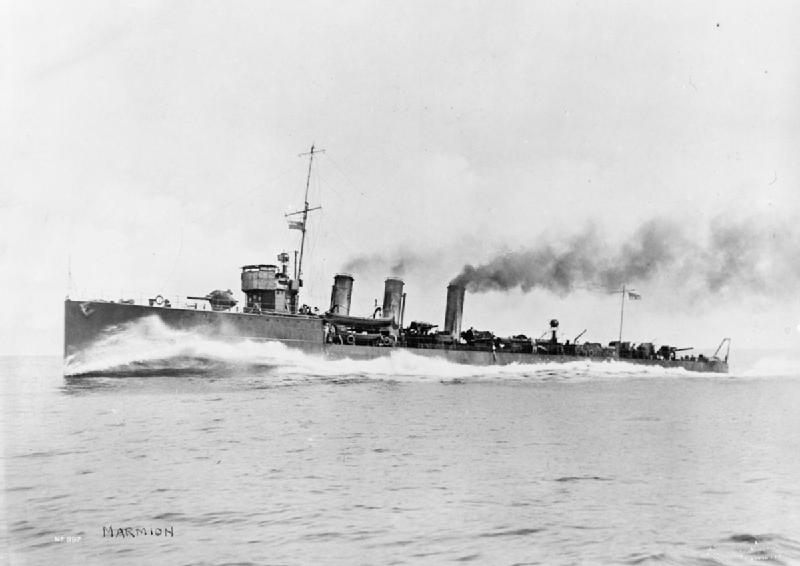
- Sister ship HMS Marmion

History

United Kingdom
- Name: HMS Morris
- Namesake: George Morris
- Ordered: May 1915
- Builder: John Brown & Company, Clydebank
- Yard number: 428
- Laid down: 26 March 1914
- Launched: 19 November 1914
- Completed: 31 December 1914
- Out of service: 8 November 1921
- Fate: Sold to be broken up

General characteristics
- Class & type: Admiralty M-class destroyer
- Displacement: 860 long tons (870 t) normal; 1,021 long tons (1,037 t) full load
- Length: 273 ft 8 in (83.4 m) o/a
- Beam: 26 ft 9 in (8.2 m)
- Draught: 16 ft 3 in (4.95 m)
- Propulsion: 3 Yarrow boilers; 2 Brown-Curtis steam turbines, 25,000 shp (19,000 kW)
- Speed: 34 knots (63.0 km/h; 39.1 mph)
- Range: 3,450 nmi (6,390 km; 3,970 mi) at 15 kn (28 km/h; 17 mph)
- Complement: 76
- Armament: 3 × QF 4 in (102 mm) Mark IV guns (3×1); 1 × 2-pounder (40 mm) "pom-pom" Mk. II anti-aircraft gun (1×1); 4 × 21 in (533 mm) torpedo tubes (2×2)

HMS Morris was an Admiralty M-class destroyer which served with the Royal Navy during the First World War. The M class were an improvement on the preceding L class, capable of higher speed. The ship, the only vessel to be named Morris to serve with the Royal Navy, was launched on 19 November 1914. Joining the Grand Fleet as part of a new flotilla, the destroyer was soon in action, serving as part of a destroyer screen during the Battle of Dogger Bank in January 1915 and an escort to the minelayer Princess Margaret during a skirmish with German torpedo boats eight months later. At the Battle of Jutland in 1916, the destroyer was a crucial part of the flotilla that drove the German torpedo boats away from the British battlecruisers. Morris received no hits during these confrontations. The destroyer assisted in the rescue of survivors from the R-class destroyer Simoom and the recovery of the damaged flotilla leader Botha in 1917. The ship also undertook general duties including escorting merchant ships, minelayers, monitors, and the seaplane carrier Vindex. After the armistice that ended the war, the destroyer was considered superfluous to requirements, Initially placed in reserve, Morris was decommissioned and, on 8 November 1921, sold to be broken up.

== Design and development ==
Morris was one of the initial six Admiralty M-class destroyers ordered by the British Admiralty in May 1915 as part of the 1913–14 Naval Programme, and one of the last destroyers to be ordered before the outbreak of the First World War. The M-class was an improved version of the earlier L class, designed to reach a higher speed in order to counter rumoured German fast destroyers, although it transpired these vessels did not exist. Although envisioned to have a maximum speed of 36 knots (67 km/h; 41 mph), they were eventually designed for a speed 2 knots (3.7 km/h; 2.3 mph) slower.

The destroyer was 273 feet 8 inches (83.41 m) long overall, with a beam of 26 feet 9 inches (8.15 m) and a draught of 16 feet 3 inches (4.95 m). Displacement was 860 long tons (870 t) normal and 1,021 long tons (1,037 t) full load. Power was provided by three Yarrow boilers feeding two Brown-Curtis steam turbines rated at 25,000 shaft horsepower (19,000 kW) and driving two shafts, to give a design speed of 34 knots (63 km/h; 39 mph). Three funnels were fitted and 296 long tons (301 t) of oil was carried, giving a design range of 3,450 nautical miles (6,390 km; 3,970 mi) at 15 knots (28 km/h; 17 mph).

Armament consisted of three 4-inch (102 mm) Mk IV QF guns on the ship's centreline, with one on the forecastle, one aft on a raised platform and one between the middle and aft funnels. A single 2-pounder (40 mm) pom-pom anti-aircraft gun was carried, while torpedo armament consisted of two twin mounts for 21 in (533 mm) torpedoes. The ship had a complement of 76 officers and ratings.

== Construction and career ==
Morris was laid down by John Brown & Company of Clydebank on 26 March 1914 with the yard number 428, launched on 19 November and completed on 31 December. The destroyer was the only vessel in the navy to be named after the naval officer George Morris, a commander of small ships between 1803 and 1812. The ship was deployed as part of the Grand Fleet, joining the newly formed Tenth Destroyer Flotilla.

On 23 January 1915, Morris was part of the destroyer escort for the battlecruisers of the First and Second Battlecruiser Squadrons at the Battle of Dogger Bank. The British fleet encountered a substantial German force, which turned away. Morris and rest of the flotilla pursued the retreating warships. However, the destroyers were unable to hold a speed ahead of the main fleet and so could not significantly influence the outcome of the battle. Nine days later, the destroyer joined six others of the M class at Sheerness to escort the telegraph steamer Alert in laying a minefield off the French coast, leaving the operation on 9 February. This was the first of a series of escorting duties. Morris formed part of the flotilla in escorting merchant ships between 1 and 10 June. On 16 August, the ship joined eight other destroyers that escorted the minelayer Princess Margaret on a sortie from Sheerness. During the night of the 17, the destroyer saw an attacking force of German torpedo boats, and turned to intercept them but lost sight before contact was made. By October, the destroyer, along with the rest of the flotilla, had been transferred to the Harwich Force.

The morning of 24 March 1916 found Morris escorting the seaplane carrier Vindex on an unsuccessful raid on Hoyer and Tondern. Two German armed trawlers were sunk in the action, but Morris came away unscathed. At the Battle of Jutland on 31 May and 1 June, Morris, under the command of Lieutenant Commander Edward S. Graham, was attached to the Thirteenth Destroyer Flotilla, along with sister ship Moorsom, under the light cruiser Champion. The destroyer was transferred from the Harwich Force to supplement the Grand Fleet, which had insufficient destroyers to shield both the First and Second Battlecruiser Squadrons. The flotilla attacked the battlecruisers of the German High Seas Fleet after the destruction of the Indefatigable and Queen Mary. The vessel became separated and, instead joined in a melee with German torpedo boats, led by V27. After engaging with guns and driving away the smaller warships, the destroyer attempted to attack the German capital ships but could not get a clear torpedo shot. On 23 July, the destroyer was on patrol in concert with two light cruisers and five destroyers when they encountered five torpedo boats of the German Second Flotilla. The British fleet was, however, weakened and only one of the light cruisers could be brought to bear. Morris attacked with gunfire and drove away the German ships, which escaped under the cover of a smoke screen.

On 22 January 1917, an intercepted German radio signal warned the British Admiralty that the German Sixth Torpedo Boat Flotilla was to be sent from the High Seas Fleet to reinforce their forces at Flanders. On the following day the destroyer was part of a flotilla, which also included Manly, Mansfield, Matchless, Moorsom, Nimrod and Phoebe, were to patrol an area of the Schouwen Bank. The force did not see the German ships; however, they did encounter another British contingent that did. Morris, still commanded by Graham, approached Simoom, which had been damaged in the action, and rescued 50 survivors. After unsuccessfully attempting to tow the stricken destroyer, Morris was joined by Matchless, which sank the ship.

Morris then joined the Dover Patrol, which had been recently equipped with thirteen monitors, forming part of the Sixth Destroyer Flotilla. Initially, the destroyer was held in reserve. However, this did not last long and, on 20 March, the destroyer accompanied the monitor Terror on an attack on German troops near Dunkirk. The flotilla, led by the leader Botha, encountered seven torpedo boats of the German Navy, one of which, A7, was sunk. However, Botha was damaged and Morris towed the crippled ship back to safety. On 11 May, the destroyer was part of the escort for the monitors Erebus, Marshal Soult, Sir John Moore and Terror in their bombardment of Ostend. The operation was deemed a success as the Admiralty gained intelligence that the bombardment led to the German command doubting that Ostend was a safe haven for their warships. The destroyer accompanied a subsequent attack on Zeebrugge by monitors on 24 April 1918, which also included the sinking of blockships to impede the flow of German submarines leaving the port. The ship provided a similar service to the monitors that attacked Ostend on 9 May, which once again including Erebus, Sir John Moore and Terror. Although the operation did not meet the expectations of the Admiralty and the port remained open, the bombardment was achieved without interference by enemy warships or loss of any British vessel.

After the armistice, the Royal Navy returned to a peacetime level of mobilisation and Morris was declared superfluous to operational requirements. On 15 October 1919, the destroyer was given a reduced completement and placed in reserve at Devonport. However, this did not last long and, after being decommissioned, on 8 November 1921, Morris was sold to Slough TC to be broken up.

== Pennant numbers ==
Pennant number	Date
HA3	August 1915
H85	January 1918
D35	September 1918
H47	January 1919
