= HMS Carysfort (1914) =

C-class light cruiser in the Royal Navy

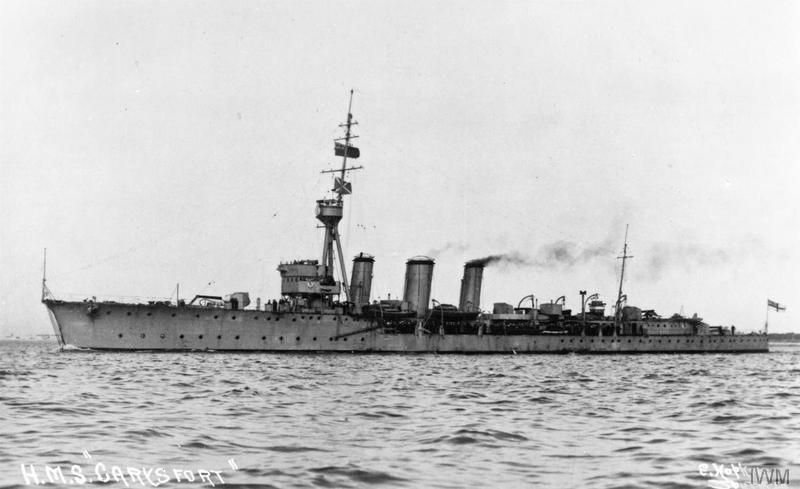
- Carysfort at anchor, 1920s

History

United Kingdom
- Name: Carysfort
- Namesake: Earl of Carysfort
- Ordered: July–August 1913
- Builder: Pembroke Dockyard, Pembroke Dock, Wales, or; Hawthorn Leslie and Company, Tyneside, England
- Laid down: 25 February 1914
- Launched: 14 November 1914
- Completed: June 1915
- Decommissioned: September 1923
- Recommissioned: September 1924
- Decommissioned: April 1931
- Identification: Pennant number: 88 (1914); 31 (Jan 18); 22 (Apr 18); 64 (Nov 19)
- Fate: Sold for scrap, August 1931

General characteristics (as built)
- Class & type: C-class light cruiser
- Displacement: 4,219 long tons (4,287 t)
- Length: 446 ft (135.9 m) (o/a)
- Beam: 41 ft 6 in (12.6 m)
- Draught: 16 ft (4.9 m) (mean)
- Installed power: 8 × Yarrow boilers; 40,000 shp (30,000 kW)
- Propulsion: 2 × shafts; 2 × steam turbines
- Speed: 28.5 knots (52.8 km/h; 32.8 mph)
- Range: 3,680 nmi (6,820 km; 4,230 mi) at 18 knots (33 km/h; 21 mph)
- Complement: 301
- Armament: 2 × single 6 in (152 mm) guns; 8 × single 4 in (102 mm) guns; 1 × single 13-pdr (3 in (76 mm)) AA gun; 2 × twin 21 in (533 mm) torpedo tubes
- Armour: Waterline belt: 1–3 in (25–76 mm); Deck: 1 in (25 mm); Conning tower: 6 in

HMS Carysfort was a C-class light cruiser built for the Royal Navy during World War I. She was one of six ships of the Caroline sub-class and was completed in 1915. Assigned to the Grand Fleet, the Harwich Force, and the Dover Patrol during the war, the ship served as a flagship for part of the war. Her only known combat was a short battle against German torpedo boats in the English Channel, although she was very active patrolling the North Sea and unsuccessfully searching for German ships. Carysfort was assigned to the Home and Atlantic Fleets after the war and was sent to the Mediterranean Fleet during the Chanak Crisis of 1922–23 to support British interests in Turkey. In 1922, she patrolled off the Irish coast during the Irish Civil War. The ship was placed in reserve after returning home in 1923 and, aside from ferrying troops overseas, remained in reserve until she was sold for scrap in 1931.

== Design and description ==
The C-class cruisers were intended to escort the fleet and defend it against enemy destroyers attempting to close within torpedo range. Ordered in July–August 1913 as part of the 1913–14 Naval Programme, the Carolines were enlarged and improved versions of the preceding Arethusa-class cruisers. The ships were 446 feet (135.9 m) long overall, with a beam of 41 feet 6 inches (12.6 m) and a mean draught of 16 feet (4.9 m). They displaced 4,219 long tons (4,287 t) at normal load and 4,733 long tons (4,809 t) at deep load.

Carysfort was powered by four direct-drive Brown-Curtis steam turbines, each driving one propeller shaft using steam generated by eight Yarrow boilers. The turbines produced a total of 40,000 shaft horsepower (30,000 kW) which gave her a speed of 28.5 knots (52.8 km/h; 32.8 mph). The ships carried enough fuel oil to give them a range of 3,680 nautical miles (6,820 km; 4,230 mi) at 18 knots (33 km/h; 21 mph). They had a crew of 301 officers and ratings.

The main armament of the Carolines consisted of two BL six-inch (152 mm) Mk XII guns that were mounted on the centreline in the stern, with one gun superfiring over the rearmost gun. Their secondary armament consisted of eight QF four-inch (102 mm) Mk IV guns, four on each side, one pair forward of the bridge, another pair abaft it on the forecastle deck and the other two pairs one deck lower amidships. For anti-aircraft defence, she was fitted with one QF 13-pounder (3-inch (76 mm)) gun. The ship also mounted two twin, rotating mounts for 21-inch (533 mm) torpedoes, one on each broadside. The Carolines were protected by a waterline belt amidships that ranged in thickness from 1–3 inches (25–76 mm) and a 1-inch (25 mm) deck. The walls of their conning tower were 6 inches thick.

=== Wartime modifications ===
A few weeks after completion, Carysfort's 13-pounder anti-aircraft (AA) gun was replaced by an Ordnance QF three-pounder (1.9-inch (47 mm)) Vickers Mk II AA gun. Between August–October 1916, her forward pair of four-inch guns were replaced by another six-inch gun and a QF four-inch Mk V gun replaced her three-pounder AA gun. In 1917, her aftmost four-inch guns were replaced by another pair of 21-inch torpedo mounts. During 1917–1918, her pole foremast was replaced by a tripod mast that was fitted with a gunnery director. In November 1918 her AA gun and a pair of four-inch guns was replaced by a pair of QF three-inch (76 mm) 20-cwt (Note: "Cwt" is the abbreviation for hundredweight, 20 cwt referring to the weight of the gun.) AA guns abaft the bridge, where the four-inch guns had originally been located. An additional six-inch gun was added abaft the funnels in March–April 1919 in lieu of her last four-inch guns. Sometime between 1919 and 1924 the ship received a pair of two-pounder (1.6-inch (40 mm)) Mk II "pom-pom" AA guns on single mounts. All of these changes adversely affected the ship's stability and the additional 21-inch torpedo tubes and the aft control position were removed by the end of 1921.

== Construction and career ==
Carysfort, the fourth ship of her name in the Royal Navy, was laid down by Pembroke Dockyard in Pembroke Dock, Wales, or Hawthorn Leslie and Company at Tyneside, England on 25 February 1914, launched on 14 November 1914, and completed in June 1915. Commissioned into service in that same month, Carysfort was assigned to the 4th Light Cruiser Squadron (4th LCS) of the Grand Fleet in August 1915.

Early that month, the squadron was dispatched to patrol off the Norwegian coast in search of the German commerce raider Meteor which was trying to return to Germany. While the squadron did not find her, the German ship was forced to scuttle herself on 9 August by other British cruisers to avoid being captured. In April 1916, she relieved her damaged sister HMS Conquest in the 5th Light Cruiser Squadron in the Harwich Force, which operated in the North Sea to guard the eastern approaches to the Strait of Dover and English Channel, and so did not participate in the Battle of Jutland a month later. In May, the ship participated in towing trials with the Coastal-class airship C 1.

On the evening of 22 July, she was flagship of Commodore Reginald Tyrwhitt, commander of the Harwich Force, as he took Carysfort, her half-sister Canterbury, and eight destroyers to sea to patrol the sea lanes between Felixstowe and the Dutch coast. He split his forces to cover the two routes involved and encountered three German torpedo boats en route to attack merchant shipping in that area around 01:15 of the following morning. Hampered by an inopportune rain squall and a German smoke screen, Tyrwhitt's ships were only able to engage the Germans for a short time before they disengaged. Tyrwhitt then ordered Canterbury and her escort to intercept the fleeing Germans; they spotted six torpedo boats about a half-hour later and opened fire at 02:02. Visibility was poor because of another smoke screen laid by the Germans and the British ships were forced to disengage without inflicting any damage at 02:25 as they were approaching a minefield.

On 19 August, the Harwich Force sortied in an attempt to intercept a German raid on Sunderland. The British had decoded German radio messages and knew the High Seas Fleet had sailed, but not its target or purpose and failed to locate the Germans. In contrast, German reconnaissance Zeppelins spotted the Harwich Force several times, but reported it as a force of battleships and cruisers, when, in actuality, it consisted of cruisers and destroyers. These reports, however, did persuade Admiral Reinhard Scheer, commander of the High Seas Fleet, to abandon his attack and turn for home. Losses to submarines and mines during the operation persuaded the British that it was too risky to deploy major forces in the southern part of the North Sea. This left the defence of the southern part of the English coast solely to local defence forces like the Harwich Force. This policy was tested when Scheer attempted another raid on 18–19 October; Tyrwhitt's force was ordered to sea based on German radio signals, but did not locate the Germans. Scheer turned around after one of his cruisers was torpedoed by a British submarine and the High Seas Fleet never again made a sortie into the North Sea in force.

A few days later, the Harwich Force sortied on the night of 23–24 October in response to the German transfer of two flotillas of torpedo boats to Zeebrugge, in occupied Belgium, but failed to make contact with the German ships. The Admiralty ordered Tyrwhitt to detach Carysfort and four destroyers to reinforce Vice-Admiral Reginald Bacon's Dover Patrol as they feared that the transfer was in preparation for a concerted attack on the shipping protected by the latter. Three nights later, the newly arrived German destroyers did exactly what the Admiralty feared and attacked. Carysfort played no role in the resulting action, but was kept in reserve and helped to search for damaged vessels the following morning. German destroyers made another attack on the night of 20/21 April 1917 and were driven off, losing two destroyers, without the cruiser's intervention.

By October, she had rejoined the 5th LCS and participated in the unsuccessful search for a pair of German light cruisers that destroyed a British convoy returning from Norway on 17 October. In December, Carysfort collided with the merchant ship SS Glentaise in the North Sea off Orford Ness, Suffolk, England. By May 1918, she was the flagship of the 7th Light Cruiser Squadron and remained with the squadron through the end of World War I in November 1918 and through at least 1 February 1919.

=== Post-war activities ===
By 18 July 1919, Carysfort had been reassigned to the 2nd Light Cruiser Squadron of the Home Fleet. She remained with the squadron as the Home Fleet was merged into the Atlantic Fleet at least through 18 December 1920. In 1922, she patrolled off the coast of Ireland during the Irish Civil War. She was detached to Turkish waters in September to support of British interests during the Chanak Crisis and remained there until April 1923. She was decommissioned and placed in reserve at Devonport in September.

In September 1924, Carysfort recommissioned for service transporting troops. She became the flagship of the Devonport Reserve in 1927. She carried troops to China from February to July 1929, and then again became flagship of the Devonport Reserve in January 1930, serving in that capacity until relieved by her sister Comus in April 1931, when Carysfort was decommissioned and placed under dockyard control at Devonport. The ship was sold for scrap four months later.
