= HMS Miranda (1914) =

Destroyer of the Royal Navy

HMS Miranda was an Yarrow M-class destroyer which served in the Royal Navy during the First World War. The M class was an improvement on those of the preceding L class, capable of higher speed. Launched in 1914, the vessel served as part of the Grand Fleet during the First World War and was sold to be broken up in 1921.
