= HMS Vindex (1915) =

British seaplane carrier

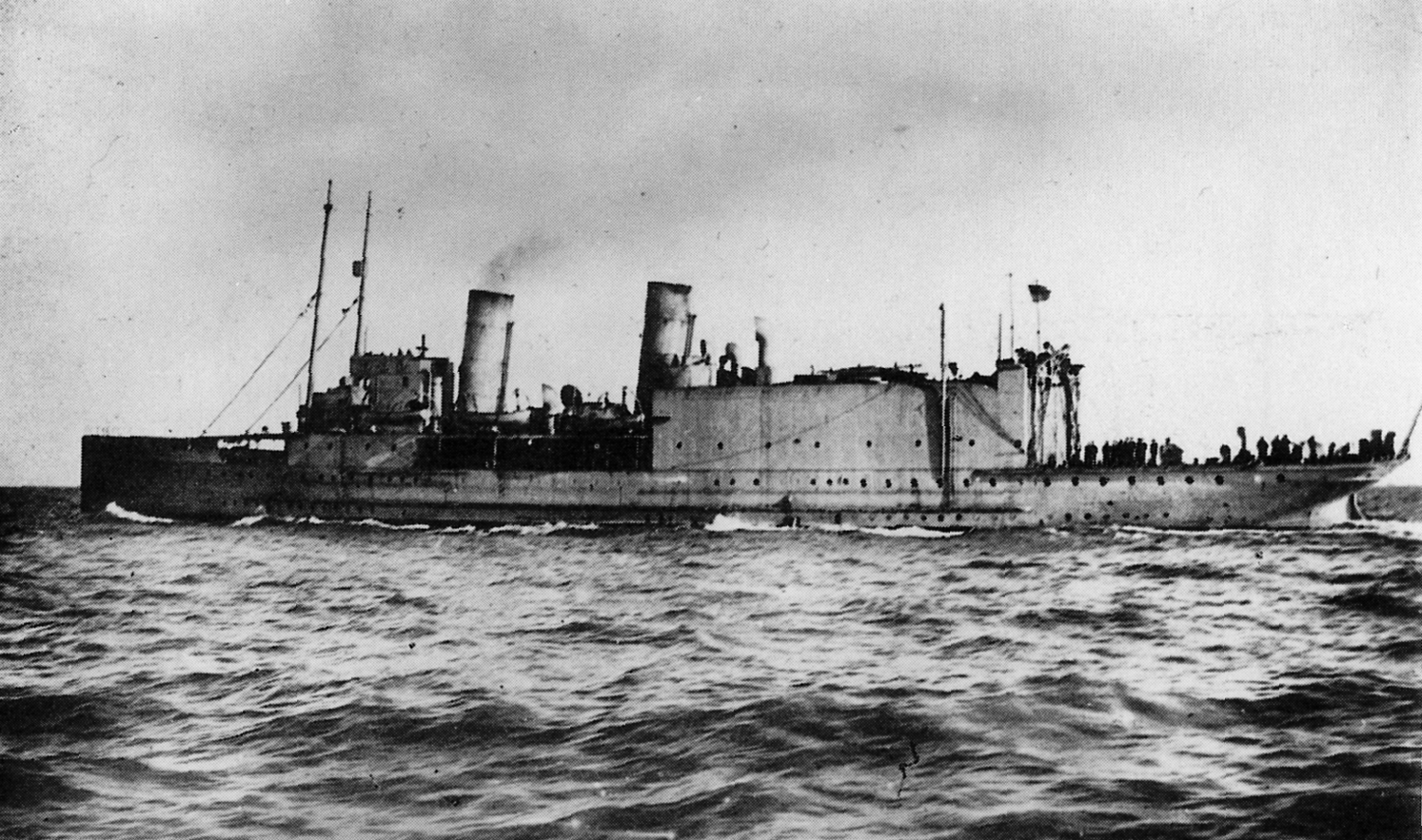
- Side view of HMS Vindex, showing the prominent seaplane hangar aft

History

United Kingdom
- Name: Vindex
- Namesake: Latin vindex ("defender, vindicator, protector")
- Builder: Armstrong Whitworth, Elswick
- Laid down: 1904
- Launched: 7 March 1905
- Completed: 26 June 1905
- Acquired: 26 March 1915 (chartered)
- Commissioned: 11 October 1915
- Fate: Scrapped, 1954

General characteristics
- Type: Aircraft/Seaplane carrier
- Displacement: 2,950 long tons (3,000 t)
- Length: 361 ft 6 in (110.2 m)
- Beam: 42 ft (12.8 m)
- Draught: 13 ft 8 in (4.2 m)
- Installed power: 4 × boilers; 11,000 shp (8,200 kW)
- Propulsion: 3 × shafts; 3 × steam turbines
- Speed: 23 kn (43 km/h; 26 mph)
- Range: 995 nmi (1,843 km; 1,145 mi) at 10 kn (19 km/h; 12 mph)
- Complement: 218
- Armament: 4 × 12-pdr (3 in (76 mm)) guns; 1 × 6-pdr (2.2 in (56 mm)) AA gun
- Aircraft carried: 7
- Aviation facilities: 1 × Flying-off deck forward

HMS Vindex was a Royal Navy seaplane carrier during the First World War, converted from the fast passenger ship SS Viking. The ship spent the bulk of her career operating the North Sea, where she twice unsuccessfully attacked the German Zeppelin base at Tondern and conducted anti-Zeppelin patrols. One of her Bristol Scout aircraft made the first take-off from an aircraft carrier in late 1915. Another made the first interception of an airship by a carrier-based aircraft on 2 August 1916, when it unsuccessfully attacked the Zeppelin LZ 53 (L 17). Vindex was transferred to the Mediterranean in 1918 and was sold back to her original owners in 1920. She was requisitioned again in 1939 and served through the Second World War as a troopship under a different name. After the end of the war, the ship was returned to her owners and was sold for scrapping in 1954.

== Description and conversion ==
The ship had an overall length of 361 feet 6 inches (110.2 m), a beam of 42 feet (12.8 m), and a draught of 13 feet 8 inches (4.2 m) at deep load. She displaced 2,950 long tons (3,000 t). Her three direct-drive steam turbines, each driving one propeller shaft, using steam provided by four boilers. The turbines produced a total of 11,000 shaft horsepower (8,200 kW) which gave the ship a speed of 23 knots (43 km/h; 26 mph). The ship carried 475 long tons (483 t) of coal which meant that she could steam for 995 nautical miles (1,843 km; 1,145 mi) at a speed of 10 knots (19 km/h; 12 mph). Her crew numbered 218, including 76 aviation personnel.

Vindex's main armament consisted of four 50-calibre, 3-inch (76 mm) 12-pounder 18 cwt (Note: "cwt" is the abbreviation for hundredweight, 18 cwt referring to the weight of the gun.) guns, with 130 rounds stored for each gun. They fired 12.5-pound (5.7 kg) projectiles at a muzzle velocity of 2,600 ft/s (790 m/s); this gave a maximum range of 9,300 yd (8,500 m). Their rate of fire was 15 rounds per minute. The ship also carried a single QF 6 pounder Hotchkiss anti-aircraft gun for which she carried 55 rounds. This had a maximum depression of 8° and a maximum elevation of 60°. It fired a 6-pound (2.7 kg) shell at a muzzle velocity of 1,765 ft/s (538 m/s) at a rate of fire of 20 rounds per minute. It had a maximum ceiling of 10,000 ft (3,000 m), but an effective range of only 1,200 yards (1,100 m). The 12-pounder guns were later replaced by two 4-inch (102 mm) anti-aircraft guns.

Vindex was fitted with a 64-foot-long (19.5 m) flying-off deck forward, intended for aircraft with wheeled undercarriages, and a prominent hangar aft. Two electric cranes were fitted aft and two derricks forward to handle her aircraft. Initially she carried two dismantled single-seat aircraft in her small forward hangar and five floatplanes in the hangar aft. Both aircraft in the forward hangar could be reassembled and flown off in about ten minutes. She was capable of operating up to seven aircraft, and during her career, operated a range of aircraft including the Sopwith Schneider, the Sopwith Pup and the Sopwith 1½ Strutter in addition to the aircraft mentioned.

== Service ==
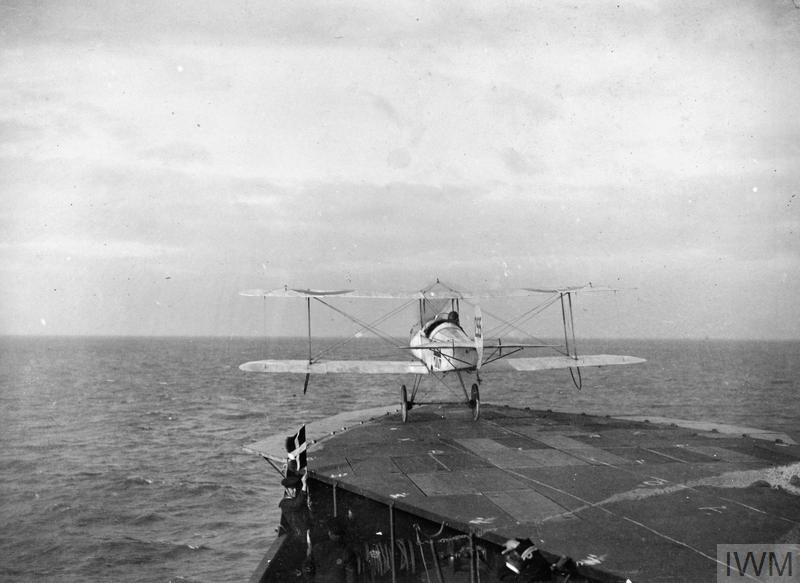
Flight Lt Harold Towler making the first take-off from an aircraft carrier during wartime on 3 November 1915 in a Bristol Scout C

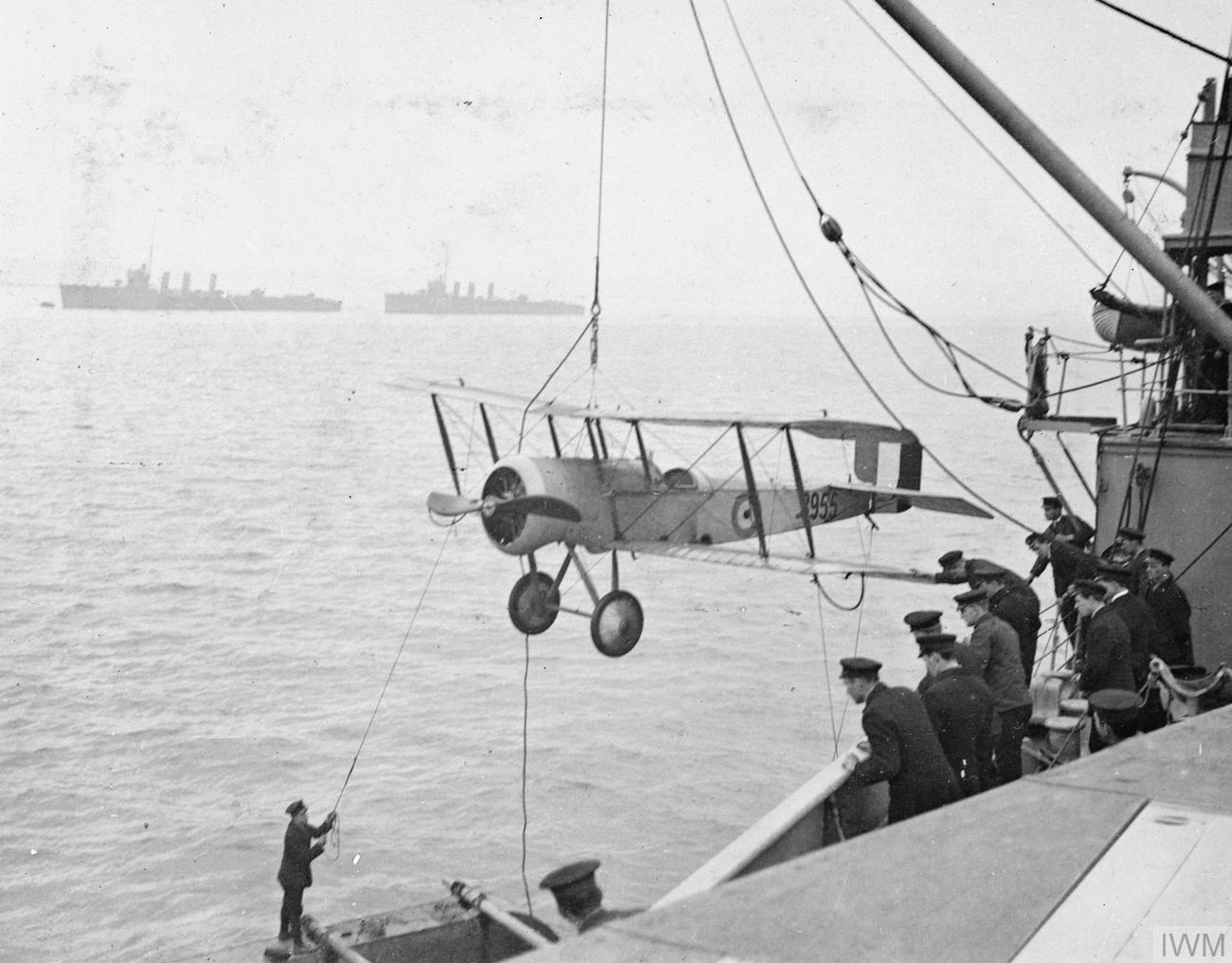
A Bristol Scout being hoisted by the Vindex's crane to be taken ashore

The ship was built in 1905 by Armstrong Whitworth, Newcastle upon Tyne as the Viking, a fast passenger ferry for the Isle of Man Steam Packet. Viking was requisitioned by the Royal Navy on 26 March 1915 for conversion to a seaplane carrier, and was purchased outright on 11 November 1915. She was renamed HMS Vindex to avoid confusion with the destroyer HMS Viking.

Vindex was assigned to the Harwich Force in November 1915 and operated in the North Sea through 1917. A Bristol Scout C flown by Flight Lieutenant Harold Towler made the first take-off from the ship on 3 November 1915 with the ship steaming at 12 knots (22 km/h; 14 mph); the aircraft only used 46 feet (14.0 m) of the flight deck and it was the first take-off by a landplane from a Royal Navy ship. On 25 March 1916 Vindex attempted to attack the Zeppelin base at Tondern with three Short Type 184 and two Sopwith Baby floatplanes, but the attack was ineffective. It did, however, draw out elements of the German Navy so it was repeated on 4 May with the addition of HMS Engadine. The two ships carried eleven Babies between them, each armed with 65-pound (29.5 kg) bombs, but eight failed to take-off; one hit the mast of an escorting destroyer and one had to return due to engine trouble. No damage was inflicted, but one Zeppelin was shot down by a cruiser when it sortied to find the British ships. On 2 August one of her Bristol Scouts unsuccessfully attacked the Zeppelin LZ 53 (L 17) with explosive Ranken darts, the first interception of an airship by a carrier-based aircraft in history. Vindex was to provide aerial reconnaissance with two of her seaplanes for a Coastal Motor Boat raid on 22 October 1916, but the operation was aborted because of fog.

The ship was transferred to the Mediterranean Fleet at Malta in 1918, where she served until she was paid off in late 1919. Vindex was originally intended to be retained for service with the fleet after the end of the war, but this proved to be too expensive and she was sold back to her original owners on 12 February 1920 and reverted to her original name. She was requisitioned again in 1939 and served through the Second World War as a troopship, but not under her earlier name. The ship was returned to her owners in 1945 and was finally sold for scrap in 1954.
