= Dover Patrol =

World War I Royal Navy unit

Coordinates: 51°9′24.7″N 1°23′33.7″E

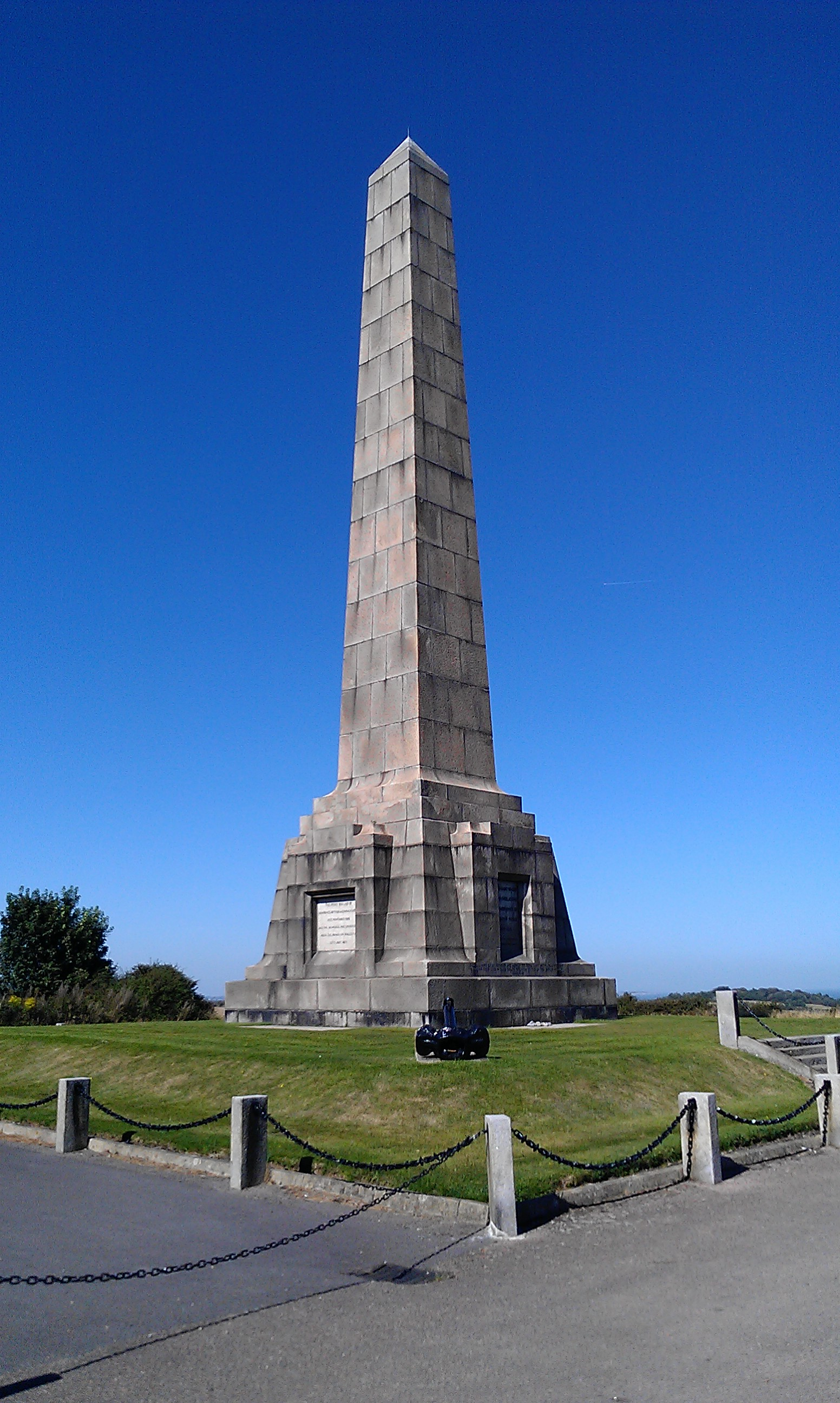
- Dover Patrol Monument near Dover
- Active: 1914–1919
- Country: United Kingdom
- Branch: Royal Navy

Commanders
- Notable commanders: Reginald Bacon

The Dover Patrol and later known as the Dover Patrol Force was a Royal Navy command of the First World War, notable for its involvement in the Zeebrugge Raid on 22 April 1918. The Dover Patrol formed a discrete unit of the Royal Navy based at Dover and Dunkirk for the duration of the First World War. Its primary task was to prevent enemy German shipping—chiefly submarines—from entering the English Channel en route to the Atlantic Ocean, thereby forcing the Imperial German Navy to travel via the much longer route around Scotland which was itself covered by the Northern Patrol.

== History ==
In late July 1914, with war looming, 12 Tribal-class destroyers arrived at Dover to join the near obsolete destroyers already at anchor in the harbour, most of them built in the late 19th century. These destroyers formed the nucleus of the fledgling Dover Patrol, which, from its early beginnings as a modest and poorly equipped command, became one of the most important Royal Navy commands of the First World War.

The Dover Patrol was established as an independent command on 12 October 1914 after the German capture of Antwerp, Zeebrugge and the impending fall of Ostend. German possession of Belgian Channel ports and rising activity of U-boats led the Admiralty to consider the Dover Straits vital enough to be distinct from the Admiral of Patrols. The first actions of the Dover Patrol included bombarding German coastal positions during the Battle of the Yser and defeating a German Navy detachment in the Battle off Texel.

The Dover Patrol assembled cruisers, monitors, destroyers, naval trawlers and drifters, paddle minesweepers, armed yachts, Motor Launches and Coastal Motor Boats, submarines, seaplanes, aeroplanes and airships. With these resources it performed several duties simultaneously in the Southern North Sea and the Dover Straits, carrying out anti-submarine patrols; escorting merchantmen, hospital and troop ships; laying sea-mines and even constructing mine barrages; sweeping up German mines; bombarding German military positions on the Belgian coast and sinking U-boats. The Dover patrol was often attacked and took many casualties as in the action of 15 February 1918.

During the war, the Dover Patrol was maintained by the Dover Engineering Works, an Iron Foundry which employed and housed hundreds of workers in Dover Town and was managed by Vivian Elkington, nephew of Walter Emden. The company still exists, operating from a reduced premises at Holmestone Road, under the name of Gatic. In March 1919 the Dover Patrol was renamed Dover Patrol Force.

== Commemoration ==
After the war, a fund was set up to erect a memorial to the Dover Patrol. In July 1921, a memorial at Leathercote Point near St Margaret's Bay was unveiled. Similar memorial obelisks stand at Cap Blanc Nez on the French channel coast, and at John Paul Jones Park near Fort Hamilton, overlooking New York harbour.

== Admirals commanding ==
Post holders included:

- Rear-Admiral The Hon. Horace Hood, 12 October 1914 – 13 April 1915
- Vice-Admiral Sir Reginald Bacon, 13 April 1915 – 1 January 1918
- Acting Vice-Admiral Sir Roger Keyes, 1 January 1918 – 20 March 1919
- Vice-Admiral Cecil Dampier, 20 March – 15 October 1919

=== Dover senior officers ===
==== Rear-Admiral and Senior Officer, Dover ====
Post holders included:

- Rear-Admiral Heathcoat Grant, 10 January – 18 June 1917
- Rear-Admiral Cecil Dampier, 18 June 1917 – 1 June 1918, also Admiral-Superintendent, Dover

==== Senior Naval Officer, Dunkirk ====
Post holders included:

- Commodore Charles Johnson, 13 December 1914 – 4 July 1917
- Commodore Hubert Lynes, 5 July 1917 – May 1918
- Commodore Frank Larken, June 1918

==== Senior Naval Officer, Folkestone ====
- Captain Pennant Lloyd, 30 October 1914 – 15 September 1916
- Rear-Admiral Bentinck Yelverton, 18 September 1916 – 21 October 1919 (retired)

==== Senior Naval Officer, Ramsgate ====
Post holders included:

- Captain George Tomlin, 15 January 1915 – 28 May 1917
- Captain Walter Allen, 27 May 1917 – 25 March 1919

== See also ==
- Charles Lightoller
- Northern Patrol
- Operation Hush
- Dover Barrage

== Bibliography ==
- Corbett, Julian Stafford (1920). Naval Operations: To the Battle of the Falklands, December 1914. History of the Great War Based on Official Documents by Direction of the Historical Section of the Committee of Imperial Defence. Vol. I (1st ed.). London: Longmans, Green & Co. OCLC 929536844.
- Scarpa, Peter (2001). Bay Ridge, New York (Images of America Series). Arcadia Publishing SC. ISBN 978-0-73-850870-2.
