= HMS Tarpon (1917) =

Destroyer of the Royal Navy

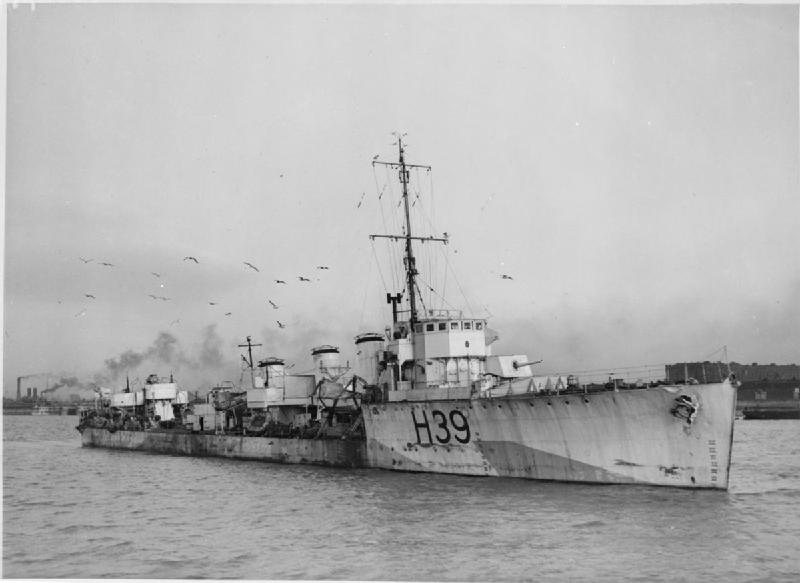
- sister ship HMS Skate in 1942

History

United Kingdom
- Name: HMS Tarpon
- Builder: John Brown & Company, Clydebank
- Laid down: 12 April 1916
- Launched: 10 March 1917
- Completed: April 1917
- Fate: Sold 4 August 1927

General characteristics
- Class & type: R-class destroyer
- Displacement: 975 long tons (991 t)
- Length: 276 ft (84.1 m)
- Beam: 26 ft 6 in (8.08 m)
- Draught: 9 ft 2 in (2.79 m)
- Propulsion: 3 boilers; 2 geared Brown Curtis steam turbines, 27,000 shp (20,000 kW)
- Speed: 36 knots (41.4 mph; 66.7 km/h)
- Range: 3,440 nmi (6,370 km) at 15 kn (28 km/h)
- Complement: 82
- Armament: 3 × QF 4-inch (101.6 mm) Mark IV guns; 1 × single 2-pounder (40-mm) "pom-pom" Mk. II anti-aircraft gun; 4 × 21 in (533 mm) torpedo tubes (2×2)

HMS Tarpon was a Royal Navy R-class destroyer constructed and operational in the First World War. She is named after the large fish Tarpon; one species of which is native to the Atlantic, and the other to the Indo-Pacific Oceans. Tarpon was built by the shipbuilders John Brown & Company at their Clydebank shipyard and was launched in March 1917 and entered service in April that year.

Tarpon served as a minelayer through the remainder of the First World War, and operated in the Baltic during the Russian Civil War. After a period attached to the Torpedo School at Portsmouth, where she was used for training and experimental purposes, Tarpon was sold for scrap in 1927.

== Construction ==
The R-class was a further development of the M-class destroyer, which had been the last class of destroyers ordered for the Royal Navy before the start of the First World War, and had therefore been built in large numbers during the early years of the war. The R-class differed by having geared rather than direct drive steam turbines, giving greater fuel efficiency, having a higher forecastle for better seakeeping and a larger and more robust bridge structure.

Tarpon was ordered from John Brown & Company by the British Admiralty in March 1916 as part of the Eighth War Construction Programme. (Note: Tarpon was one of 12 Admiralty R-class destroyers ordered as part of this programme, together with three Yarrow M-class destroyers and 11 Admiralty Modified R-class destroyers.) The ship was laid down at John Brown's Clydebank shipyard on 12 April 1916. On 10 February 1917, while Tarpon was still under construction, it was decided to modify the destroyer for use as a minelayer. She was launched on 10 March 1917 and completed in April that year.

Tarpon was 276 feet (84.12 m) long overall, with a beam of 26 feet 6 inches (8.08 m) and a draught of 9 feet (2.74 m). Displacement was 975 long tons (991 t) normal and 1,075 long tons (1,092 t) deep load. Three Yarrow boilers fed steam to two sets of Brown-Curtis geared steam turbines rated at 27,000 shaft horsepower (20,000 kW) and driving two shafts, giving a design speed of 36 knots (67 km/h; 41 mph). Three funnels were fitted. 296 tons of oil were carried, giving a design range of 3,450 nautical miles (6,390 km; 3,970 mi) at 15 knots (28 km/h; 17 mph). Armament consisted of three QF 4in Mk IV guns on the ship's centreline, with one on the forecastle, one aft on a raised bandstand and one between the second and third funnels. A single 2-pounder (40 mm) pom-pom anti-aircraft gun was fitted, while torpedo armament consisted of four 21 inch (533 mm) torpedoes in two twin mounts. As converted to a minelayer, Tarpon's aft gun and one of the pairs of torpedo-tubes could be removed to accommodate about 40 mines to be carried. (Note: Friedman notes that the rated capacity was 44 mines as built, which reduced to 38 in 1918. but Smith states a load of 40 mines for Tarpon and sister ship Telemachus.) The armament could be re-instated in about 12 hours to allow operation as a normal destroyer. The ship had a complement of 82 officers and men.

== Service ==
In May 1917 the destroyer was assigned to the 13th Destroyer Flotilla of the Grand Fleet, based at Rosyth and combining support to the Battlecruiser force with minelaying operations. On the night of 13/14 June 1917, Tarpon, together with the light cruiser Royalist and the destroyer leader Abdiel, together with a close escort of four destroyers and a more distant screening force of three more destroyers and two light cruisers, laid a minefield of 195 mines in the Heligoland Bight. Tarpon, together with sister ship Telemachus and the destroyers Meteor and Legion, escorted by the destroyers Swift, Torrid, Teazer, Thruster and Springbok, laid mines off Ostend on the night of 14/15 July 1917. Two German torpedo boats, probably G91 and V70, passed within 500 yards (460 m) of the force while they were laying the minefield but saw nothing. On the return journey, Tarpon struck a mine, badly damaging her stern, and had to be towed back to Dunkirk by Thruster. This minefield may have caused the loss of the German submarine UC-1, which failed to return from a mission to lay mines off Calais, departing Zeebrugge on 18 July and was due back on 20 July.

Tarpon was under repair for several months, and then joined the recently established 20th Destroyer Flotilla based on the Humber, which had the principal role of minelaying, particularly in the Helgoland Bight. She is listed in the Navy List as being part of the 20th Flotilla in March 1918, but did not carry out another minelaying operation until the night of 21/22 April, when Tarpon, Telemachus, Abdiel, Legion, Ariel and Sandfly laid 318 mines. On 15 May 1918, Tarpon, together with Abdiel, Telemachus, Venturous, Ariel, Ferret and Sandfly were on their way to lay a minefield when they ran into thick fog. Telemachus collided with Sandfly and Tarpon with Ariel. While Telemachus, Tarpon and Ariel sustained little damage, Sandfly was holed in the engine room, and had to be towed back to England by Ferret, escorted by Telemachus. Venturous lost touch with the formation, so in the end, only Tarpon, Abdiel and Ariel succeeded in laying a total of 152 mines. Tarpon was refitted in late June 1918.

The 20th Flotilla, including Tarpon, was carrying another minelaying operation on the night of 2–3 August 1918 when the destroyer Vehement struck a mine, blowing off her bow, quickly followed by Ariel, which soon sank. It proved impossible to salvage Vehement, which was scuttled using gunfire and depth charges. These losses were as a result of German defensive minefields in the Bight, which resulted in a reduction of British minelaying activities there, but the 20th Flotilla, including Tarpon continued to be active through to the end of the war. Tarpon laid a total of 1425 mines during the war.

The 20th Flotilla was deployed to the Baltic at the end of June 1919, providing minelaying support to the British intervention in the Russian Civil War. Tarpon remained part of the 20th Flotilla in October 1919, and was at Riga in Latvia in October 1919. The 20th Flotilla sailed from the Baltic for Britain on 25 October. By December 1919, Tarpon was listed as attached to the 2nd Flotilla of the Atlantic Fleet. She was re-commissioned on 1 February 1920 as a tender to HMS Vernon, the Torpedo School at Portsmouth. Tarpon remained part of Vernon in 1925, being used for experimental work on mine warfare, including tests of high speed sweeps for minesweeping and testing the behaviour of depth charges when used against deep diving submarines, as well as regular training activities as part of the school.

Tarpon was sold for scrap to Cashmore's of Newport on 4 August 1927.

== Pennant numbers ==
Pennant number	Dates
F72	1917–January 1918
F22	January 1918–June 1918
H97	June 1918 –September 1918
F79	September 1918 – 1919
F65	1919–
