= HMS Springbok =

Destroyer of the Royal Navy

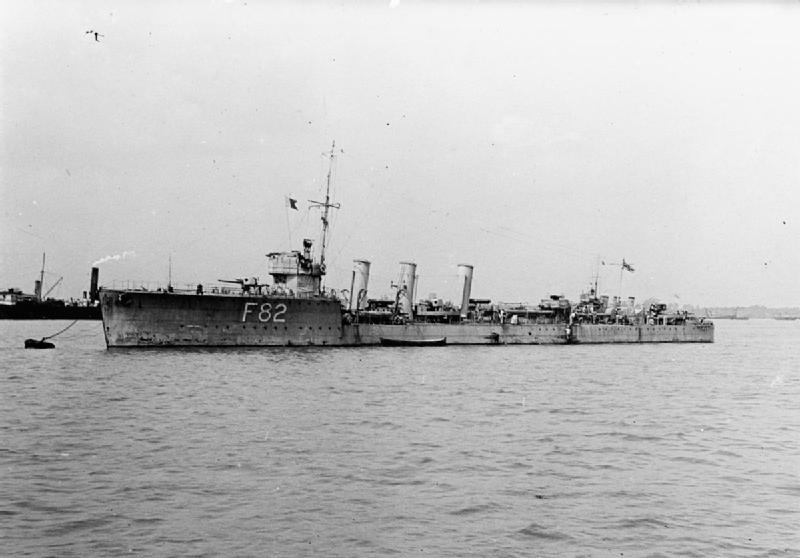
- Sistership HMS Thisbe

History

United Kingdom
- Name: HMS Springbok
- Namesake: Springbok
- Ordered: December 1915
- Builder: Harland and Wolff, Belfast
- Laid down: 27 January 1916
- Launched: 9 March 1917
- Commissioned: 30 April 1917
- Out of service: 16 December 1926
- Fate: Sold to be broken up

General characteristics
- Class & type: R-class destroyer
- Displacement: 1,036 long tons (1,053 t) normal
- Length: 265 ft (80.8 m) long overall
- Beam: 26 ft 9 in (8.15 m)
- Draught: 9 ft (2.7 m) mean
- Propulsion: 3 Yarrow boilers; 2 geared Brown-Curtis steam turbines, 27,000 shp (20,000 kW)
- Speed: 36 knots (41.4 mph; 66.7 km/h)
- Range: 3,450 nmi (6,390 km) at 15 kn (28 km/h)
- Complement: 90
- Armament: 3 × QF 4-inch (101.6 mm) Mark IV guns, mounting P Mk. IX; 1 × single 2-pounder (40-mm) "pom-pom" Mk. II anti-aircraft gun; 4 × 21 in (533 mm) torpedo tubes (2×2); 2 x 18 in (457 mm) torpedo tubes

HMS Springbok was an R-class destroyer which served with the Royal Navy during World War I. The R class were an improvement on the preceding M-class, including using geared steam turbines. Launched on 9 March 1917, the vessel operated as part of the Harwich Force on escort duties. In 1917, the destroyer, along with sister ship Thruster, captured the German merchant ships Brietzig and Pellworm. After the conflict, the destroyer initially was posted to the navy's torpedo school but was soon afterwards reduced to reserve. After less than ten years in service, Springbok was sold on 16 December 1926 and broken up.

== Design and development ==
Springbok was one of eight R-class destroyers ordered by the British Admiralty on 21 December 1915 as part of the Seventh War Construction Programme. The design was generally similar to the preceding M-class destroyers, but differed in having geared steam turbines, the central gun mounted on a bandstand and minor changes to improve seakeeping.

The destroyer was 265 feet (80.77 m) long overall, with a beam of 26 feet 9 inches (8.15 m) and a draught of 9 feet (2.74 m). Displacement was 1,036 long tons (1,053 t). Power was provided by three Yarrow boilers feeding two Brown-Curtis geared steam turbines rated at 27,000 shaft horsepower (20,000 kW). Each turbine drove a single shaft to give a design speed of 36 knots (67 km/h; 41 mph). Three funnels were fitted. A total fuel load of 296 long tons (301 t) of oil was carried, giving a design range of 3,450 nautical miles (6,390 km; 3,970 mi) at 15 knots (28 km/h; 17 mph).

Armament consisted of three 4 in (102 mm) Mk IV QF guns on the ship's centreline, with one on the forecastle, one aft on a raised platform and one between the funnels, and a single 2-pounder (40 mm) pom-pom anti-aircraft gun. Torpedo armament was four 21-inch (533 mm) torpedo tubes in two twin rotating mounts aft, initially complemented by two 18-inch (457 mm) tubes mounted either side of the superstructure. Soon into service, the two smaller calibre torpedoes were removed as they proved ineffectual. The ship had a complement of 82 officers and ratings.

== Construction and career ==
Springbok was laid down by Harland and Wolff at Belfast with yard number 497. Construction was very swift, with the keel laid down on 27 January 1916, launching on 9 March 1917 and fitting out completed on 30 April. The ship was named after the springbok, the African antelope Antidorcas marsupialis.

On commissioning, Springbok joined the 10th Destroyer Flotilla as part of the Harwich Force under the flotilla leader Nimrod. On 4 June, Springbok formed part of the support for the bombardment of Ostend on 5 June 1917. The destroyer, together with Swift, Teazer, Thruster and Torrid, escorted Legion, Meteor, Tarpon and Telemachus as they laid mines off Ostend on the night of 14/15 July 1917. This minefield may have caused the loss of the German submarine UC-1, which departed from Zeebrugge on 18 July and failed to return from a mission to lay mines off Calais. Meanwhile, on 15 July, Springbok had captured, along with Thruster, the Hamburg-registered merchant ships S.S. Brietzig and Pellworm, furnishing the captured ships with prize crews.

After the war, the destroyer was allocated to the torpedo school at Nore. However, this posting did not last long and the vessel was reduced to reserve on 22 May 1919. In 1923, the Royal Navy decided to scrap many of the older destroyers in preparation for the introduction of newer and larger vessels. After less than ten years in service, the destroyer was sold on 16 December 1926 at Granton, Edinburgh and broken up.

== Pennant numbers ==
Pennant number	Date
F65	January 1917
F63	January 1918
G49	January 1919
H40	January 1922
