= HMS Gabriel (1915) =

Destroyer of the Royal Navy

History

United Kingdom
- Name: HMS Gabriel
- Builder: Cammell Laird, Birkenhead, England
- Laid down: 12 January 1915
- Launched: 23 December 1915
- Commissioned: 1 July 1916
- Fate: Sold for scrapping 9 May 1921

General characteristics
- Class & type: Marksman-class flotilla leader
- Displacement: 1,700 long tons (1,700 t) (full load)
- Length: 324 ft 10 in (99.01 m) o/a
- Beam: 31 ft 9 in (9.68 m)
- Draught: 12 ft 0 in (3.66 m)
- Propulsion: Oil-fired Yarrow type boilers; Parsons steam turbines; 2 shafts; 36,000 shp (27,000 kW)
- Speed: 34 knots (39 mph; 63 km/h)
- Complement: 106—116
- Armament: 2 × QF 4-inch (101.6 mm) Mk IV guns; 2 × single 2 pdr "pom-pom" Mk. II AA guns; 2 × twin 21 inch (533 mm) torpedo tubes

HMS Gabriel was a Marksman-class flotilla leader of the British Royal Navy, that took part in the First World War. The ship was built by Cammell Laird at Birkenhead, being launched on 23 December 1915 and entering service in July 1916. Gabriel served with the Grand Fleet, leading a destroyer flotilla and was later used as a minelayer. She survived the war, before being sold for scrap on in May 1921.

== Construction and design ==
In November 1914, as part of the Emergency War Programme of shipbuilding, the British Admiralty ordered three Marksman-class flotilla leaders (i.e. large destroyers intended to lead flotillas of smaller destroyers in action) from the Birkenhead shipyard Cammell Laird. (Note: The first two ships of the class, Marksman and Lightfoot, were ordered as part of the 1913–1914 shipbuilding programme, with two more ships, Kempenfelt and Nimrod as part of the 1914–1915 programme.) The first of these three ships, HMS Gabriel (originally to be named Abdiel) was laid down on 12 January 1915 and was launched on 23 December 1915. The construction of the three Marksman-class ships by Cammell Laird was problematical, with the ships suffering machinery problems and construction delays, with the Admiralty complaining to Lairds that "better workmanship and supervision" were needed for Ithurial and Gabriel, which were 8 months behind programme. Gabriel was to continue to suffer from machinery problems throughout her career. Gabriel was considered during construction for a conversion to a minelayer, but construction delays resulted in Abdiel, which was expected to complete earlier, being chosen instead. Gabriel was commissioned on 1 July 1916.

The Marksman-class ships were 324 feet 10 inches (99.01 m) long overall, 324 ft (99 m) at the waterline and 315 ft 0 in (96.01 m) between perpendiculars. They had a beam of 31 ft 9 in (9.68 m) and a draught of 12 ft 0 in (3.66 m). The design displacement was 1,440 long tons (1,460 t) normal and 1,700 long tons (1,700 t) full load. (Note: Jane's Fighting Ships gave a displacement of 1,655 long tons (1,682 t) in 1919 for Gabriel.) Gabriel was propelled by three sets of Parsons steam turbines, fed by four Yarrow three-drum boilers, rated at 36,000 shaft horsepower (27,000 kW), which gave a speed of 34 kn (39 mph; 63 km/h). Four funnels were fitted. Up to 515 tons of oil fuel could be carried, giving a range of 4,290 nautical miles (7,950 km; 4,940 mi) at 15 knots (28 km/h; 17 mph). The ship's crew was 104 officers and men.

Gabriel was armed with four QF 4-inch (102 mm) Mk IV guns mounted on the ships centreline, with two 2-pounder (40-mm) "pom-pom" anti-aircraft guns and four 21 inch (533 mm) torpedo tubes.

== Service ==
On commissioning, Gabriel joined the 13th Destroyer Flotilla of the Grand Fleet, serving as leader along with the cruiser Champion, duties including acting as escort to the Battle Cruiser Force. In July 1916, intelligence reports of a German Merchant raider attempting to break out into the North Sea and Atlantic, resulted in a large scale operation being launched to intercept the ship, involving 14 cruisers, 13 armed merchant cruisers and 18 destroyers. As part of these operations, Gabriel and sister ship Marksman patrolled the Fair Isle channel between the Orkneys and Shetland Islands from 11 to 13 July. Nothing was found by these operations.

On 18 March 1917, Gabriel attacked a German submarine with depth charges, without any apparent effect. She again depth charged a suspected German submarine on 30 April 1917. In May 1917, the 13th Flotilla, including Gabriel moved to Rosyth. In October 1917, Gabriel formed part of a large-scale operation, involving 30 cruisers and 54 destroyers deployed in eight groups across the North Sea in an attempt to stop a suspected sortie by German naval forces, with Gabriel (along with Petard, Norseman and Urchin) joining up with the 1st Light Cruiser Squadron on 17 October. Despite these countermeasures, the two German light cruisers Bremse and Brummer managed to evade the patrols and attacked the regular convoy between Norway and Britain on 17 October, sinking nine merchant ships and two destroyers, Mary Rose and Strongbow before returning safely to Germany.

In mid-1918, Gabriel was converted to a minelayer, with the ability to carry 80 mines, with minesweeping paravanes fitted to provide some protection against mines when penetrating enemy minefields. Gabriel re-entered service after conversion in July 1918 with the 20th Destroyer Flotilla, (Note: Smith states that Gabriel joined the 20th Flotilla in August 1918.) a specialist destroyer minelaying flotilla based at Immingham with the role of laying mines in the Heligoland Bight, blocking German swept channels through existing minefields. Gabriel acted as leader for the "Slow Division", consisting of the older destroyers of the flotilla, while the newer faster vessels formed the "Fast Division", led by Abdiel. Gabriel took part in the ship's first offensive minelaying sortie in enemy-controlled waters on 28 September, carrying out more offensive minelaying operations on 30 September and on 2 October. In total, Gabriel had laid 850 mines by the end of the war in November 1918.

Gabriel remained in the 20th Flotilla after the end of the war, deploying with the flotilla to the Baltic in July–August 1919 as part of the British intervention in the Russian Civil War, operating from Reval (now Tallinn) in Estonia and Libau (now Liepāja) in Latvia. Duties including laying minefields to restrict the operations of the Soviet Baltic Fleet and to protect the anchorages used by the British.

On 23 August 1919, Gabriel arrived at Queenstown in Ireland for laying up with defective boiler tubes, being relieved in the 20th Flotilla by Seymour. While initially it was planned to repair the ship's boilers, by October it had been decided to spend no more money on Gabriel, which was laid up at Devonport.

== Disposal ==
Gabriel was sold to T. W. Ward for £2,756 on 9 May 1921 as part of a bulk sale of obsolete warships. She was handed over for scrapping at Ward's Lelant, Cornwall yard on 20 October 1922.

== Pennant numbers ==
Pennant number	From	To
G21	July 1916	January 1917
F00	January 1917	June 1918
F91	September 1918	October 1919
F67	November 1919	-
