= HMS Telemachus (1917) =

Destroyer of the Royal Navy

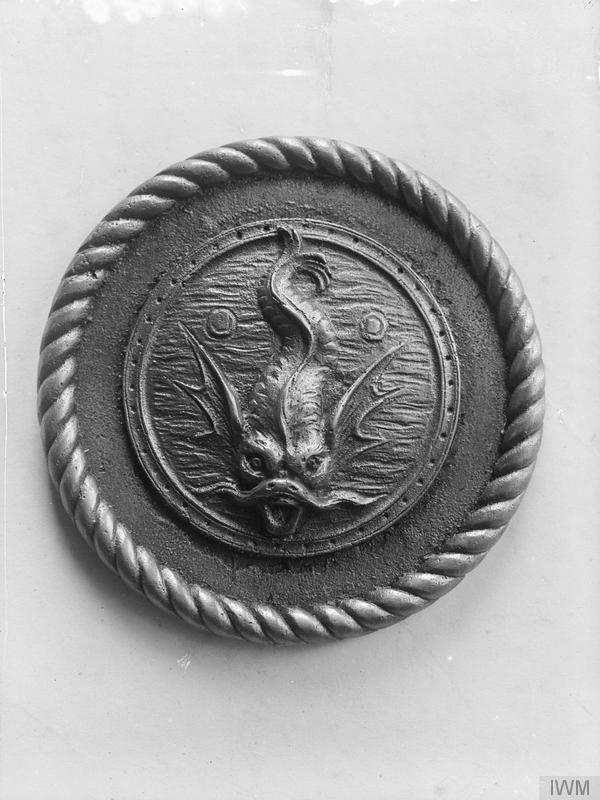
- Badge of the Telemachus

History

United Kingdom
- Name: HMS Telemachus
- Namesake: Telemachus
- Builder: John Brown & Co., Clydebank
- Laid down: 12 April 1916
- Launched: 21 April 1917
- Completed: June 1917
- Fate: Sold 26 July 1927

General characteristics
- Class & type: R-class destroyer
- Displacement: 1,220 long tons (1,240 t) deep load
- Length: 276 ft 1 in (84.15 m) oa
- Beam: 26 ft 9 in (8.15 m)
- Draught: 1 ft 5 1/2 in (0.44 m)
- Installed power: 27,000 shp (20,000 kW)
- Propulsion: 3× Yarrow boilers; Brown-Curtis steam turbines; 3 shafts
- Speed: 36 kn (41 mph; 67 km/h)
- Complement: 82
- Armament: 3 × 4-inch (102 mm) guns; 1 × 2-pounder (40 mm) guns; 4 × 21 inch (533 mm) torpedo tubes

HMS Telemachus was a R-class destroyer of the British Royal Navy that took part in the First World War. She was built in 1916–1917 by the Scottish shipbuilder John Brown at their Clydebank shipyard. Telemachus was modified to serve as a minelayer, laying minefields in the German Bight and English Channel to restrict the operation of German submarines. The ship survived the war and was sold for scrap in 1927.

== Design ==
The R-class was a further development of the M-class destroyer, which had been the last class of destroyers ordered for the Royal Navy before the start of the First World War, and had therefore been built in large numbers during the early years of the war. The R-class differed by having geared rather than direct drive steam turbines, giving greater fuel efficiency, having a higher forecastle for better seakeeping and a larger and more robust bridge structure.

The standard Admiralty M-class ships were 276 feet 1 inch (84.15 m) long overall and 265 feet 0 inches (80.77 m) between perpendiculars, with a beam of 26 feet 9 inches (8.15 m) and a draught of 13 feet 5 1/2 inches (4.102 m). Displacement was 1,072 long tons (1,089 t) normal and 1,220 long tons (1,240 t) deep load. Three Yarrow water-tube boilers fed steam to Brown-Curtis geared steam turbines which drove two propeller shafts. The machinery was rated at 27,000 shaft horsepower (20,000 kW) giving a speed of 36 knots (41 mph; 67 km/h).

The ships were armed with three 4-inch (102 mm) QF Mk IV guns, together with one 2-pounder pom-pom anti-aircraft autocannon. Two twin 21-inch (533mm torpedo tubes were fitted. The ships had a crew of 82. As converted to a minelayer, Telemachus's aft gun and one of the pairs of torpedo-tubes were removed to allow 40 mines to be carried. The armament could be re-instated in about 12 hours to allow operation as a normal destroyer.

Telemachus was one of 15 R-class destroyers ordered in March 1916 as part of the 8th Emergency War programme. She was laid down on 12 April 1916 at John Brown & Co.'s Clydebank shipyard. In January 1917 it was decided to convert Telemachus to a minelayer while she was still under construction. Telemachus was launched on 21 April 1917 and completed in June 1917.

== Service ==
On commissioning, Telemachus joined the 13th Destroyer Flotilla of the Grand Fleet, based at Rosyth. Telemachus combined the flotilla's normal duties in support of the Grand Fleet's battlecruisers with minelaying operations, frequently converting between normal destroyer and minelayer configuration. Telemachus, together with sister ship Tarpon and the destroyers Meteor and Legion, escorted by the destroyers Swift, Torrid, Teazer, Thruster and Springbok, carried out her first minelaying operation on the night of 14/15 July 1917, when mines were laid off Ostend. Two German torpedo boats, probably G91 and V70, passed within 500 yards (460 m) of the force while they were laying the minefield but saw nothing. On the return journey, Tarpon struck a mine, badly damaging her stern, and had to be towed back to Dunkirk by Thruster. This minefield may have caused the loss of the German submarine SM UC-1, which failed to return from a mission to lay mines off Calais, departing Zeebrugge on 18 July and was due back on 20 July. On 1–10 October 1917, Telemachus took place in a large scale operation to intercept German submarines on their way home through the North Sea, with destroyers patrolling a line of mine-nets which were hoped to catch any passing submarine. At the time it was thought the operation accounted for three submarines (U-50, U-66 and U-106) but in fact these submarines were sunk elsewhere. On 13 October, the Swedish barque Esmerelda, sailing for the Tyne with a load of pit-props, was sunk by the German submarine UB-58. Telemachus spotted the burning Esmerelda and rescued her crew.

While she served with the 13th Flotilla, Telemachus's minelaying duties mainly lay in the approaches to the Belgian ports rather than longer-ranged missions to the German Bight. In February 1918, Telemachus joined the newly established 20th Flotilla, tasked with laying mines in channels swept by the Germans in the existing British minefields in the German Bight. As well as the direct effects of ships sunk by the mines, these mines would require considerable effort by the Germans in clearing them.

On the morning of 27 March 1918, (Note: Smith says the incident occurred on 28 March.) Telemachus, together with Abdiel, Legion, Vanquisher, Ariel and Ferret, were laying a minefield in the German Bight when they encountered three German trawlers serving as patrol boats. The three trawlers did not realise that the destroyers were British until they had finished laying their minefield, when they signalled by radio the presence of the British ships. Telemachus went to seize one of the trawlers, which the Germans scuttled, while the remaining two German ships were captured by the British and then scuttled. On 15 May 1918, Telemachus, together with Abdiel, Tarpon, Venturous, Ariel, Ferrett and Sandfly were on their way to lay a minefield when they ran into thick fog. Telemachus collided with Sandfly and Tarpon with Ariel. While Telemachus, Tarpon and Ariel sustained little damage, Sandfly was holed in the engine room, and had to be towed back to England by Ferret, escorted by Telemachus.

The 20th Flotilla, including Telemachus, was carrying another minelaying operation on the night of 2–3 August 1918 when the destroyer Vehement struck a mine, blowing off her bow. Abdiel was preparing to take Vehement under tow when a second destroyer, Ariel was also mined. Ariel quickly sank, and it proved impossible to salvage Vehement, which was scuttled by Telemachus and Vanquisher using gunfire and depth charges. The squadron continued minelaying until the end of the war, with Telemachus laying a total of 1898 mines during the war.

Telemachus remained in use after the war as an experimental minelayer, but was sold for scrap to Hughes Bolckow at Blyth on 26 July 1927.

== Pennant numbers ==
Pennant number	Dates
F86	1917–January 1918
F23	January 1918–June 1918
H98	June 1918 –September 1918
F81	September 1918 – 1919
F66	1919–

== Bibliography ==
- Dittmar, F.J.; Colledge, J.J. (1972). British Warships 1914–1919. Shepperton, UK: Ian Allan. ISBN 0-7110-0380-7.
- Dorling, Taprell (1932). Endless Story: Being an Account of the Work of the Destroyers, Flotilla Leaders, Torpedo-Boats and Patrol Boats in the Great War. London: Hodder and Stoughton.
- Friedman, Norman (2009). British Destroyers: From Earliest Days to the Second World War. Barnsley, UK: Seaforth Publishing. ISBN 978-1-84832-049-9.
- Gardiner, Robert; Gray, Randal, eds. (1985). Conway's All The World's Fighting Ships 1906–1921. London: Conway Maritime Press. ISBN 0-85177-245-5.
- Grant, Peter M. (1964). U-Boats Destroyed: The Effect of Anti-Submarine Warfare, 1914–1918. London: Putnam.
- Manning, T. D. (1961). The British Destroyer. London: Putnam.
- Monograph No. 35: Home Waters Part IX: 1st May 1917 to 31st July 1917 (PDF). Naval Staff Monographs (Historical). Vol. XIX. Naval Staff, Training and Staff Duties Division. 1939.
- Smith, Peter C. (2005). Into The Minefields: British Destroyer Minelaying 1916–1960. Barnsley, UK: Pen & Sword Books. ISBN 1-84415-271-5.
