= HMS Kempenfelt (1915) =

Destroyer of the Royal Navy

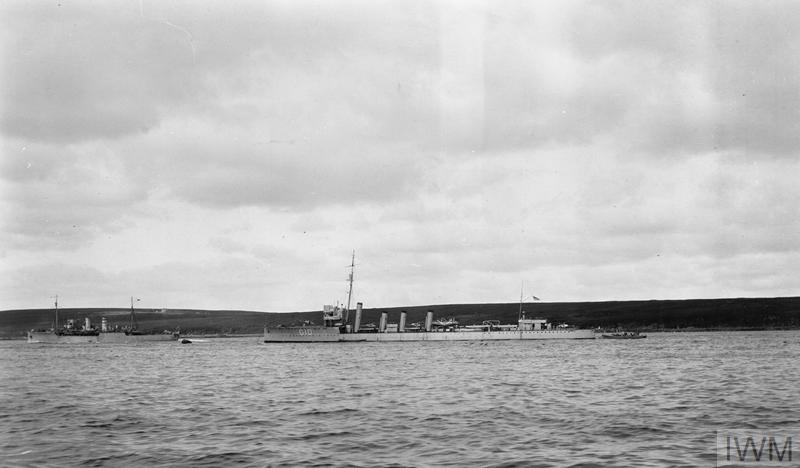
- Kempenfelt, May 1917

History

United Kingdom
- Name: HMS Kempenfelt
- Builder: Cammell Laird, Birkenhead
- Laid down: 2 October 1914
- Launched: 1 May 1915
- Commissioned: 20 August 1915
- Fate: Sold for scrap 9 May 1921

General characteristics
- Class & type: Marksman-class flotilla leader
- Displacement: 1,440 long tons (1,460 t) normal; 1,700 long tons (1,700 t) deep load
- Length: 324 ft 10 in (99.01 m) (overall)
- Beam: 31 ft 9 in (9.68 m)
- Draught: 12 ft (3.66 m)
- Propulsion: Three shafts; Brown-Curtis steam turbines; Four Yarrow boilers; 36,000 shp (27,000 kW)
- Speed: 34 kn (63 km/h; 39 mph)
- Range: 4,290 nmi (7,950 km; 4,940 mi) at 15 knots (28 km/h; 17 mph)
- Complement: 104
- Armament: 4 × QF 4-inch (102 mm) Mark IV guns; 2 × single 2-pounder (40-mm) "pom-pom" Mk. II; 2 × twin 21-inch (533 mm) torpedo tubes

HMS Kempenfelt was a Marksman-class flotilla leader (Note: Also known as the Lightfoot-class or the Kempenfelt-class.) of the British Royal Navy. She was built by the Cammell Laird at their Birkenhead shipyard, with construction starting in 1914 and completed in August 1915. She served through the remainder of the First World War. She was sold for scrap in 1921.

== Construction and design ==
The British Admiralty issued requests for tenders for two flotilla leaders of the Marksman-class, Nimrod and Kempenfelt, in April 1914 as part of the 1914–1915 Naval Estimates, as a follow-on to the orders placed for the two ships of the class (Note: Lightfoot and Marksman) in the 1913–1914 Estimates. Flotilla Leaders were large destroyer-type vessels intended to lead flotillas of smaller destroyers in action.

The Marksman-class ships were 324 feet 10 inches (99.01 m) long overall, 324 feet (99 m) at the waterline and 315 feet 0 inches (96.01 m) between perpendiculars. They had a beam of 31 feet 9 inches (9.68 m) and a draught of 12 feet 0 inches (3.66 m). The design displacement was 1,440 long tons (1,460 t) normal and 1,700 long tons (1,700 t) full load, with a displacement of 1,607 long tons (1,633 t) stated for Nimrod in 1919. Three sets of Brown-Curtis steam turbines were fed by four Yarrow three-drum boilers, rated at 36,000 shaft horsepower (27,000 kW), which gave a speed of 34 knots (63 km/h; 39 mph). Cruising turbines were fitted to the outer shafts. Four funnels were fitted. Up to 515 tons of oil fuel could be carried, giving a range of 4,290 nautical miles (7,950 km; 4,940 mi) at 15 knots (28 km/h; 17 mph).

The ship's main gun armament consisted of four QF 4-inch (102 mm) Mk IV guns mounted on the ships centreline, with two of the guns positioned between the ship's funnels. An anti-aircraft armament of two 1-pounder (37 mm) "pom-pom" autocannons was planned, but during construction the 1-pounder pom-poms were diverted to the British Expeditionary Force when it deployed to France at the start of the First World War, and the ship completed with two 2-pounder (40-mm) "pom-pom"s instead. Torpedo armament consisted of two twin 21-inch (533 mm) torpedo tubes. In August 1915 Kempenfelt was selected for conversion to a fast minelayer, but owing to problems during sea trials, sister ship Abdiel was selected instead. In 1916, Kempenfelt was fitted with an explosive anti-submarine sweep, but this was removed in July that year. The ship's crew was 104 officers and men.

Kempenfelt was laid down at Cammell Laird's Birkenhead shipyard on 2 October 1914 and was launched on 1 May 1915. During sea trials, the ships machinery was heavily forced, producing over 37,000 shp (28,000 kW) with speeds of almost 35 knots (40 mph; 65 km/h). The ship was completed on 20 August 1915.

== Service ==
On 14 August 1915, while undergoing sea trials in Liverpool Bay, Kempenfelt reported sighted the periscope of an unknown submarine, possibly U-38. On 21 August 1915, following commissioning Kempenfelt joined the newly established 11th Destroyer Flotilla at Scapa Flow, part of the Grand Fleet, as leader. On 6 January 1916, the pre-dreadnought battleship King Edward VII, which was travelling alone because the severe weather prevented destroyers from keeping pace, struck a mine near Cape Wrath. When reports of the mining reached Scapa Flow, Kempenfelt and 12 destroyers were despatched to assist and to protect the stricken battleship from enemy submarines. (It was thought at first that King Edward VII had been torpedoed). Kempenfelt and a tug took King Edward VII but the towline parted and the battleship was abandoned, with her crew being taken off by the destroyers Musketeer, Marne, Fortune and Nessus before the battleship sank.

Kempenfelt sailed as part of the 11th Destroyer Flotilla at the Battle of Jutland on 31 May–1 June 1916. Kempenfelt survived the battle without damage.

Kempenfelt remained part of the 11th Flotilla until September 1917, joining the 6th Destroyer Flotilla as part of the Dover Patrol on 15 September, where she served until 2 April 1918, then rejoining the 11th Flotilla. Kempenfelt was still a member of the 11th Flotilla at the end of the war. By March 1919, Kempenfelt was in reserve at Portsmouth. She was sold for scrap to T W Ward on 9 May 1921 for £2778 and was broken up at Ward's Morecambe yard from August 1921.

== Pennant numbers ==
| Pennant Number | From | To |
|---|---|---|
| HA1 | August 1915 | 1917 |
| G10 | 1917 | January 1918 |
| F87 | January 1918 | April 1918 |
| G12 | April 1918 | - |

== Bibliography ==
- Bacon, Reginald (1919). The Dover Patrol 1915–1917 Volume II. London: Hutchinson & Son. OCLC 867981501.
- Burt, R. A. (1986). Warships Illustrated No. 7: British Destroyers in World War One. London: Arms & Armour Press. ISBN 0-85368-753-6.
- Campbell, John (1998). Jutland: An Analysis of the Fighting. London: Conway Maritime Press. ISBN 0-85177-750-3.
- Dittmar, F.J.; Colledge, J.J. (1972). British Warships 1914–1919. Shepperton, UK: Ian Allan. ISBN 0-7110-0380-7.
- English, John (2019). Grand Fleet Destroyers: Part I: Flotilla Leaders and 'V/W' Class Destroyers. Windsor, UK: World Ship Society. ISBN 978-0-9650769-8-4.
- Friedman, Norman (2009). British Destroyers: From Earliest Days to the First World War. Barnsley, UK: Seaforth Publishing. ISBN 978-1-84832-049-9.
- Gardiner, Robert; Gray, Randal, eds. (1985). Conway's All the World's Fighting Ships 1906–1921. London: Conway Maritime Press. ISBN 0-85177-245-5.
- Jellicoe, John (1919). The Grand Fleet 1914–1916: Its Creation, Development and Work. London: Cassell and Company, Ltd.
- Manning, T. D. (1961). The British Destroyer. London: Putnam.
- Moore, John (1990). Jane's Fighting Ships of World War I. London: Studio. ISBN 1-85170-378-0.
- Monograph No. 13: Summary of Operations of the Grand Fleet August 1914 to September 1916 (PDF). Naval Staff Monographs (Historical). 1921.
- Monograph No. 30: Home Waters—Part V: From July to October 1915 (PDF). Naval Staff Monographs (Historical). Vol. XIV. The Naval Staff, Training and Staff Duties Division. 1926.
- Monograph No. 31: Home Waters—Part VI: From October 1915 to May 1916 (PDF). Naval Staff Monographs (Historical). Vol. XV. The Naval Staff, Training and Staff Duties Division. 1926.
- Smith, Peter C. (2005). Into the Minefields: British Destroyer Minelaying 1916–1960. Barnsley, UK: Pen & Sword Maritime. ISBN 1-84415-271-5.
