= HMS Abdiel (1915) =

Royal Navy minelayer (1915)

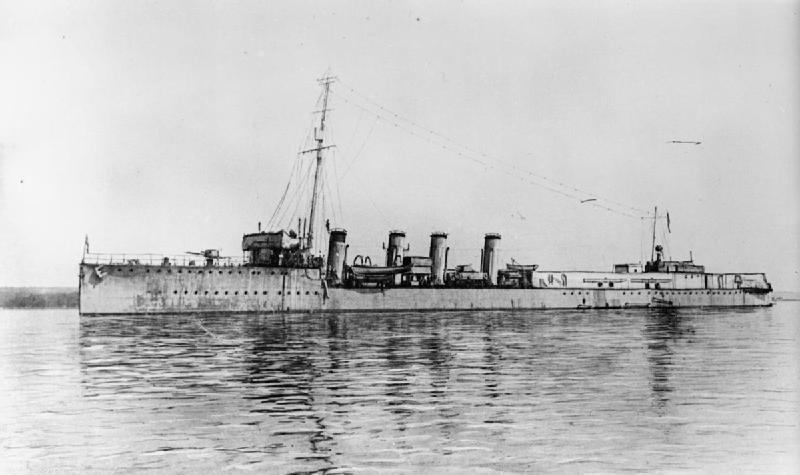
- HMS Abdiel fitted as a minelayer. The aft end of the ship is screened off with canvas to conceal the minelaying equipment

History

United Kingdom
- Name: HMS Abdiel
- Builder: Cammell Laird, Birkenhead
- Laid down: 6 May 1915
- Launched: 12 October 1915
- Commissioned: 26 March 1916
- Honours and awards: Jutland 1916
- Fate: Sold for scrap 30 July 1936

General characteristics
- Class & type: Marksman-class flotilla leader
- Displacement: 1,440 long tons (1,460 t) normal; 1,700 long tons (1,700 t) deep load
- Length: 324 ft 10 in (99.01 m) (overall)
- Beam: 31 ft 9 in (9.68 m)
- Draught: 12 ft (3.66 m)
- Propulsion: Three shafts; Parsons turbines; Four Yarrow boilers; 36,000 shp (27,000 kW)
- Speed: 34 kn (63 km/h; 39 mph)
- Range: 4,290 nmi (7,950 km; 4,940 mi) at 15 knots (28 km/h; 17 mph)
- Complement: 104
- Armament: 2 × QF 4-inch (102 mm) Mk IV guns; 2 × single 2 pdr "pom-pom" Mk. II AA guns; 66 mines

HMS Abdiel was a Marksman-class flotilla leader of the Royal Navy, built by Cammell Laird during the First World War. She was converted to a minelayer during construction, commissioning during 1916, and served at the Battle of Jutland. Following the end of the war, Abdiel served in the Baltic during the Russian Civil War. She was sold for scrap in 1936.

== Construction and design ==
In November 1914, as part of the Emergency War Programme of shipbuilding, the British Admiralty ordered three Marksman-class flotilla leaders (i.e. large destroyers intended to lead flotillas of smaller destroyers in action) from the Birkenhead shipyard Cammell Laird. (Note: The first two ships of the class, Marksman and Lightfoot, were ordered as part of the 1913–1914 shipbuilding programme, with two more ships, Kempenfelt and Nimrod as part of the 1914–1915 programme.) The third of these three ships, HMS Abdiel (originally to be named Ithuriel) was laid down on 6 May 1915 and was launched on 12 October 1915.

The Marksman-class ships were 324 feet 10 inches (99.01 m) long overall, 324 feet (99 m) at the waterline and 315 feet 0 inches (96.01 m) between perpendiculars. They had a beam of 31 feet 9 inches (9.68 m) and a draught of 12 feet 0 inches (3.66 m). The design displacement was 1,440 long tons (1,460 t) normal and 1,700 long tons (1,700 t) full load. Abdiel was propelled by three sets of Parsons steam turbines, fed by four Yarrow three-drum boilers, rated at 36,000 shaft horsepower (27,000 kW), which gave a speed of 34 knots (63 km/h; 39 mph). Four funnels were fitted. Up to 515 tons of oil fuel could be carried, giving a range of 4,290 nautical miles (7,950 km; 4,940 mi) at 15 knots (28 km/h; 17 mph). The ship's crew was 104 officers and men. (Note: Jane's Fighting Ships of World War I gives a crew of 110, while Jane's Fighting Ships 1931 gives a crew of 128.)

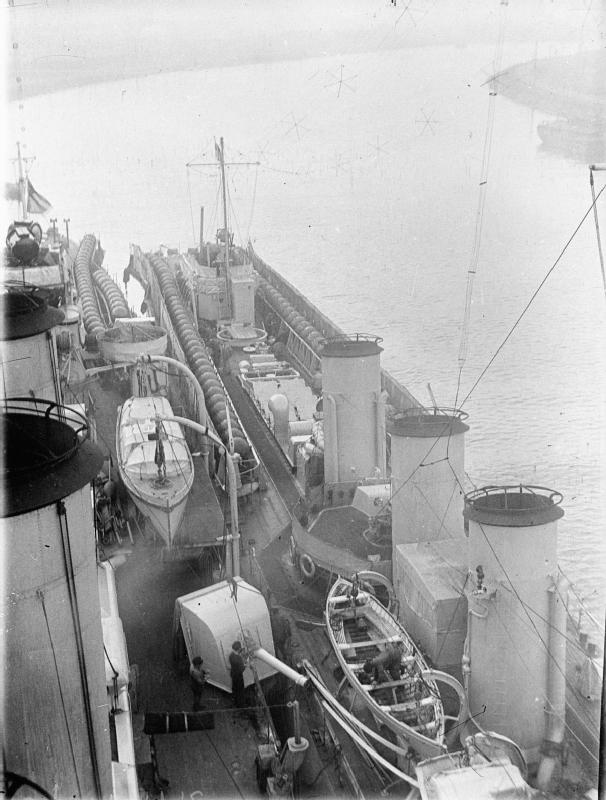
Abdiel (right) moored alongside the cruiser Aurora, showing the ships' minerails.

The armament of the Marksman-class was planned to be four QF 4-inch (102 mm) Mk IV guns mounted on the ships centreline, with two 2-pounder (40-mm) "pom-pom" anti-aircraft guns and four 21 inch (533 mm) torpedo tubes. In September 1915 it was decided to convert Abdiel to allow her to operate as a fast minelayer. (Note: Both Kempenfelt and Gabriel were considered for the prototype minelayer conversion, but Abdiel was chosen owing to the progress of her construction.) The conversion involved removing the ship's torpedo tubes and the aft two 4-inch guns to allow the fitting of rails to carry mines. Abdiel's initial mine payload was 66 mines. Canvas screens were fitted to hide the ship's mine rails from neutral observers. Silhouettes of guns and torpedo tubes were later painted on the canvas screens to further disguise the ship's role and equipment, particularly from long distances and in poor visibility. When fully laden with mines, the ship's speed was reduced to 30 knots (56 km/h; 35 mph), with a range of 800 nautical miles (1,500 km; 920 mi) at 25 knots (46 km/h; 29 mph), sufficient for the ship's intended operational area of the Heligoland Bight.

In 1917, Abdiel was fitted with a modified superstructure, while in 1918, her mine rails were modified to allow 80 mines to be carried, and a third 4-inch gun fitted.

== Service ==
=== First World War ===
On commissioning on 26 March 1916, Abdiel joined the Grand Fleet, based at Scapa Flow in Orkney. Abdiel, under the command of Commander Berwick Curtis was employed carrying out night-time minelaying missions in the Heliogoland Bight and off Horns Reef. Abdiel accompanied the Grand Fleet at the Battle of Jutland on 31 May/1 June 1916. During the main fleet engagement, Abdiel was on the disengaged side of Jellicoe's battleships, After nightfall, Jellicoe ordered Abdiel to lay a minefield in the expected path of the retreating German fleet, to the northwest of Sylt. Abdiel successfully laid her mines between 01:24 and 02:04. Later that morning, the German battleship Ostfriesland struck a mine laid by Abdiel on 4 May, blowing a hole 12.2 m × 4.9 m (40 ft × 16 ft), and causing damage that kept Ostfriesland in dock until 26 July.

Abdiel continued her minelaying operations through 1917 and into 1918, with her earlier solo missions being superseded by more complex operations involving more ships which resulted in larger minefields being laid. In February 1918, the 20th Destroyer Flotilla, a specialist minelaying flotilla based at Immingham on the Humber, was formed, with Curtis in command and Abdiel as his flagship, tasked with mining the swept channels that German minesweepers made in existing minefields. On 27 March 1918, while laying minefield A34 70 nmi (81 mi; 130 km) north-west of Heligoland, Abdiel, together with Legion, Telemachus, Vanquisher, Ariel and Ferret encountered three armed German trawlers, Polarstern, Mars and Scharbentz. All three trawlers were sunk and 72 prisoners were captured.

During July 1918, Abdiel underwent a much needed refit. On 1 August 1918, Abdiel was leading the 20th Flotilla on its way to lay minefield A67 when the flotilla ran into a German minefield, with the destroyers Vehement and Ariel striking mines. Ariel sank quickly with the loss of 49 of her crew, but Abdiel took the remains of Vehement in tow. (Vehement's bow had been blown off by the explosion, which killed 48 of her crew). The attempt proved unsuccessful, however, with the tow having to be abandoned and Vehement was scuttled. The Flotilla continued its minelaying operations until the end of the war, with Abdiel laying 6293 mines during the war.

=== Post war-operations ===
Abdiel continued as leader of the 20th Flotilla following the end of the war, and when the 20th Flotilla was sent to the Baltic to provide minelaying support to the British intervention in the Russian Civil War, Abdiel with Curtiss still in command, went at its head. The 20th Flotilla arrived in the Baltic at the end of June 1919, but on 12 July Abdiel and five destroyers were sent back to England in order to escort a flotilla of eight Coastal Motor Boats (CMBs) from their base at Osea Island, Essex to Biorko, Finland. While one of the CMBs sank under tow, the other seven boats successfully reached their destination. The 20th Flotilla, supported by the minelayer Princess Margaret, then reverted to its main role of laying minefields to contain the Bolshevik Baltic Fleet. On 31 August, Abdiel and Vittoria had anchored near Seskar Island while on patrol and were spotted by the Bolshevik submarine Pantera, which fired two torpedoes, which sunk Vittoria. Abdiel rescued all but eight of Vittoria's crew, while Pantera returned to Kronstadt. Minelaying operations were completed by the middle of September, but Abdiel and part of the 20th Flotilla remained in the Baltic. On 8 October 1919, pro-Baltic German forces under the command of Pavel Bermondt-Avalov attempted to seize the Latvian capital Riga. Abdiel, anchored on the Dvina river in Riga came under heavy fire on 10 October, being forced to move out of range of the shelling by Bermondt's forces. Bermondt's attack was repelled by the Latvians following a bombardment by British and French warships, and on 26 October, the 20th Flotilla was relieved and set out on its journey back to the United Kingdom.

It was decided to retain Abdiel for service as a minelayer postwar, and she was refitted at Chatham Dockyard in March–April 1920, before taking part in Reserve Fleet exercises at Portland Harbour in July that year. By August 1920, Abdiel was in reserve at the Nore, again taking part in Reserve Fleet exercises, this time at Torbay in July–August 1924. In 1926, underwent a refit, refurbishing her machinery and retubing her boilers. She was also fitted to carry larger mines during this period. On completing this refit, Abdiel reached a speed of 31 knots (57 km/h; 36 mph) during sea trials, and commissioned into active service with the Atlantic Fleet on 30 September that year. In January 1927, Abdiel returned to the reserve, with her crew being assigned to the destroyer Tyrian. She remained in reserve, first at Sheerness, and from August 1927 at Chatham, until 1936. On 30 July that year Abdiel was sold for scrap to Rees of Llanelly for £6,755.

== Pennant numbers ==
Pennant Number	From	To
G35	March 1916	January 1917
F43	January 1917	January 1918
F49	1 Jan 1918	1919
F60	1919	-
