= HMS Venturous =

Destroyer of the Royal Navy

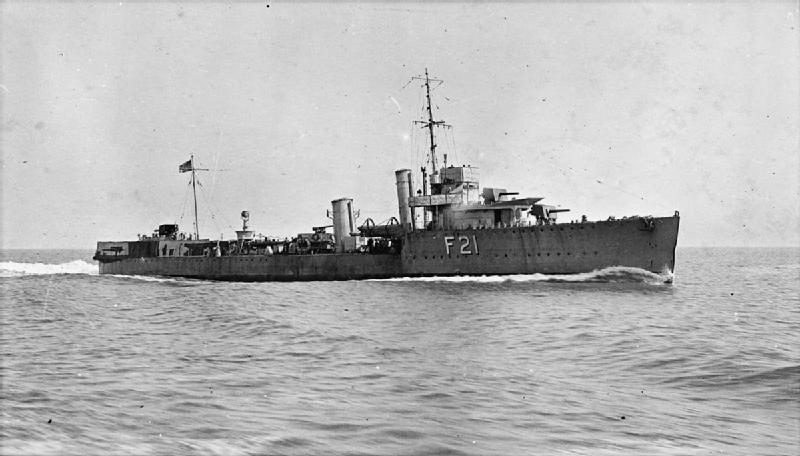
- HMS Venturous sometime between January and September 1918, when her pennant number was F21. She has a gun painted on a canvas screen aft to conceal her minelaying capabilities.

History

United Kingdom
- Name: HMS Venturous
- Namesake: venturous
- Ordered: July 1916
- Builder: William Denny and Brothers, Dumbarton
- Laid down: 9 October 1916
- Launched: 21 September 1917
- Completed: 29 November 1917
- Identification: Pennant number: F30 (1917); F21 (January 1918); F87 (September 1918); D87
- Fate: Transferred for scrapping 24 August 1936

General characteristics
- Class & type: Admiralty V-class destroyer
- Displacement: 1,272-1,339 tons
- Length: 300 ft (91.4 m) o/a, 312 ft (95.1 m) p/p
- Beam: 26 ft 9 in (8.2 m)
- Draught: 9 ft (2.7 m) standard, 11 ft 3 in (3.4 m) deep
- Propulsion: 3 Yarrow type Water-tube boilers; Brown-Curtis steam turbines; 2 shafts, 27,000 shp
- Speed: 34 kn
- Range: 320-370 tons oil, 3,500 nmi at 15 kn, 900 nmi at 32 kn
- Complement: 110
- Armament: 4 × QF 4 in Mk.V (102mm L/45), mount P Mk.I; 2 × QF 2 pdr Mk.II "pom-pom" (40 mm L/39) or; 1 z QF 12 pdr 20 cwt Mk.I (76 mm), mount HA Mk.II; 4 (2x2) tubes for 21 in torpedoes

HMS Venturous (D87) was a V-class destroyer of the British Royal Navy that saw service in World War I.

== Construction and commissioning ==
Venturous, the first Royal Navy ship of the name, was ordered in July 1916. She was laid down on 9 October 1916 by William Denny and Brothers at Dumbarton, Scotland, and, per a British Admiralty order of 12 January 1917, fitted to carry 60 naval mines for operations as a minelayer. She was launched on 21 September 1917 and completed on 29 November 1917. Her original pennant number, F30, assigned in 1917, became F21 in January 1918 and F87 in September 1918 before finally changing to D87.

== Service history ==
During World War I, Venturous took part in the first deployment of operational magnetic bottom mines when she joined the destroyers HMS Abdiel, Tarpon, Telemachus, Vanoc, and Vanquisher, escorted by eight other destroyers, in laying 234 Sinker Mk1(M) mines in the North Sea off the coast of Flanders, Belgium, about eight nautical miles (15 km) north of Dunkirk, France. German forces did not interfere with the operations. She also participated with Abdiel, Tarpon, Telemachus, and Vanquisher in the second operation to lay Sinker mines on 22 August 1918, in the North Sea off Flanders about 17 nautical miles (31 km) north of Zeebrugge, Belgium, supported by Royal Air Force aircraft which patrolled to prevent German aerial observation of the operation.

As the result of a reorganization of Royal Navy destroyer flotillas in 1921, Venturous became part of the 9th Destroyer Flotilla along with the destroyer leaders HMS Douglas, Valentine, and Valkyrie and the destroyers Vanessa, Verdun, Vesper, Vivien, and Whitley. The entire flotilla was transferred to the Reserve Fleet on 4 April 1922 and laid up at Rosyth, Scotland, with reduced crews, but it was recommissioned on 8 April 1925 and renumbered as the 7th Destroyer Flotilla.

== Final disposition ==
After World War I, the United Kingdom received the passenger liner SS Bismarck from Germany in 1920 as a war reparation, and she was sold to the White Star Line, later the Cunard White Star Line, in which she served as RMS Majestic. In 1936, Cunard White Star retired Majestic and sold her to Thos. W. Ward for scrapping, but because of legal requirements imposed under the agreement transferring Majestic to the United Kingdom as a war prize, the British government instead took control of Majestic and assigned her to the Royal Navy. To pay Thos. W. Ward for Majestic, the Royal Navy agreed to transfer 24 old destroyers with a combined scrap value equivalent to that of Majestic to Thos W Ward for scrapping. Venturous was among these, and her transfer to Thos W Ward for scrapping took place on 24 August 1936. She was scrapped at Inverkeithing, Scotland.

== Bibliography ==
- Colledge, J. J.; Warlow, Ben (2006) [1969]. Ships of the Royal Navy: The Complete Record of All Fighting Ships of the Royal Navy from the 15th Century to the Present (3rd Rev ed.). London: Chatham Publishing. ISBN 978-1-86176-281-8. OCLC 67375475.
- Cocker, Maurice. Destroyers of the Royal Navy, 1893–1981. Ian Allan. ISBN 0-7110-1075-7.
- Friedman, Norman (2009). British Destroyers From Earliest Days to the Second World War. Annapolis, Maryland: Naval Institute Press. ISBN 978-1-59114-081-8.
- Gardiner, Robert & Gray, Randal, eds. (1985). Conway's All the World's Fighting Ships 1906–1921. Annapolis, Maryland: Naval Institute Press. ISBN 0-85177-245-5.
- March, Edgar J. (1966). British Destroyers: A History of Development, 1892–1953; Drawn by Admiralty Permission From Official Records & Returns, Ships' Covers & Building Plans. London: Seeley Service. OCLC 164893555.
- Preston, Antony (1971). 'V & W' Class Destroyers 1917–1945. London: Macdonald. OCLC 464542895.
- Raven, Alan & Roberts, John (1979). 'V' and 'W' Class Destroyers. Man o'War. Vol. 2. London: Arms & Armour. ISBN 0-85368-233-X.
