= Marksman-class flotilla leader =

1915 class of British flotilla leaders

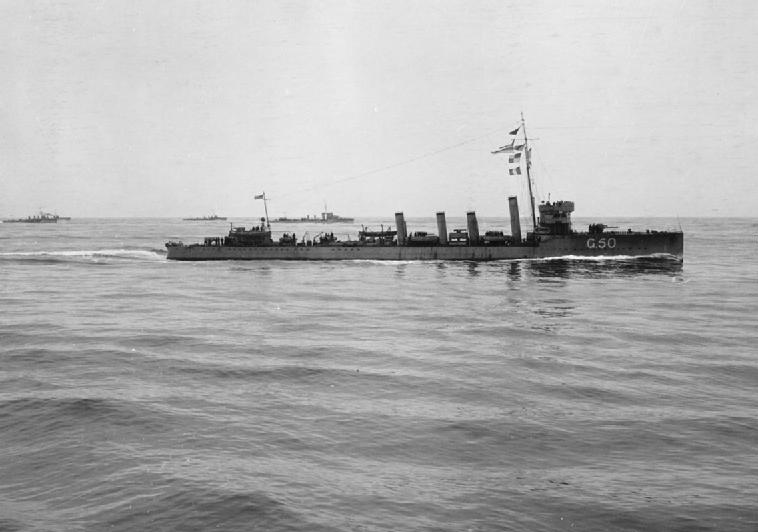
- HMS Ithuriel

Class overview
- Name: Marksman-class
- Operators: Royal Navy
- Preceded by: Faulknor class
- Succeeded by: Parker class
- Built: 1914–1916
- In commission: 1915–1936
- Completed: 7

General characteristics
- Type: Destroyer leader
- Displacement: 1,600 long tons (1,626 t)
- Length: 324 ft (98.8 m)
- Beam: 31 ft 9 in (9.68 m)
- Draught: 12 ft (3.7 m)
- Propulsion: Yarrow type boilers (White-Forster in Lightfoot); steam turbines; 3 shafts; 36,000 shp
- Speed: 34 knots (63 km/h; 39 mph)
- Complement: 106–116
- Armament: 4 × 4 in (102 mm) guns; 2 × single 2 pdr (40 mm (1.6 in)) AA guns; 2 × twin 21 in (533 mm) torpedo tubes

The Marksman class (sometimes known as Lightfoot class) were a class of flotilla leaders built for the Royal Navy. Two each were ordered in the naval programmes of 1913–14 and 1914–15 with a further three being ordered under the Emergency War Programme and all saw service during World War I.

Like other British flotilla leader designs, these ships were significantly larger than the typical destroyers, to accommodate the flotilla staff ("Captain (D)" in Royal Navy parlance) and the additional signalling gear. All ships had four funnels, the foremost being taller (although it was cut down post-war in Nimrod and Abdiel). They were armed with four QF 4 inch guns. The guns were carried one each on the forecastle, between the first three funnels and on a bandstand on the quarterdeck. Abdiel and Gabriel were later fitted as fast minelayers, for which purposes they landed the after 4 inch gun and their torpedo tubes and were screened by canvas panels from the fourth funnel to the stern to give shelter to 60 to 70 mines. Nimrod and Kempenfelt later received QF 12 pdr (3 inch / 76 mm) 18 cwt anti aircraft guns in place of one of the QF 2-pounder.

Following the war-time trend to install director firing in ever-smaller vessels, as resources permitted, Lightfoot was selected to serve as a test-bed for the Royal Navy's new training-only director firing system for flotilla leaders and destroyers in March 1917. By August, results obtained were favourable enough that it was decided to equip fully 203 other leaders and destroyers of "L" class and later.

== Ships ==
Two were ordered under the 1913–14 Programme.

- Lightfoot — built by J. Samuel White, Cowes, laid down 9 June 1914, launched 28 May 1915, completed 29 May 1915, sold for breaking up 9 May 1921.
- Marksman — built by Hawthorn Leslie and Company, Newcastle upon Tyne, laid down 20 July 1914, launched 28 April 1915, completed 18 November 1915, sold for breaking up 8 November 1921.

Two ordered under the 1914–15 Programme.

- Kempenfelt — built by Cammell Laird, Birkenhead, laid down 2 October 1914, launched 1 May 1915, completed 20 August 1915, sold for breaking up 9 May 1921.
- Nimrod — built by William Denny and Brothers, Dumbarton, laid down 9 October 1914, launched 12 April 1915, completed 25 August 1915, sold for breaking up 5 November 1926.

Three ordered in November 1914 under the War Emergency Programme.

- Abdiel — built by Cammell Laird, Birkenhead, laid down 6 May 1915, launched 12 October 1915, completed 26 March 1916, sold for breaking up July 1936.
- Gabriel — built by Cammell Laird, Birkenhead, laid down 12 January 1915, launched 23 December 1915, completed 1 July 1916, sold for breaking up 9 May 1921.
- Ithuriel — built by Cammell Laird, Birkenhead, laid down 14 January 1915, launched 12 March 1916, completed 2 August 1916, sold for breaking up 8 November 1921.

== Bibliography ==
- Colledge, J. J.; Warlow, Ben (2006) [1969]. Ships of the Royal Navy: The Complete Record of All Fighting Ships of the Royal Navy from the 15th Century to the Present (3rd Rev ed.). London: Chatham Publishing. ISBN 978-1-86176-281-8. OCLC 67375475.
- Dittmar, F. J.; Colledge, J. J. (1972). British Warships 1914–1919. Ian Allan. ISBN 0-7110-0380-7.
- Friedman, Norman (2009). British Destroyers From Earliest Days to the Second World War. Naval Institute Press. ISBN 978-1-59114-081-8.
- March, Edgar J. (1966). British Destroyers: A History of Development, 1892–1953; Drawn by Admiralty Permission From Official Records & Returns, Ships' Covers & Building Plans. Seeley Service. OCLC 164893555.
- Preston, Antony (1985). "Great Britain and Empire Forces". In Gray, Randal (ed.). Conway's All the World's Fighting Ships 1906–1921. Naval Institute Press. pp. 1–104. ISBN 0-85177-245-5.
- The Technical History and Index: Fire Control in HM Ships. Technical History Branch, Admiralty. 1919. CB 1515 (23). Now O.U. 6171/14. At The National Archives. ADM 275/19
