= Berwick Curtis =

Royal Navy admiral

Vice-Admiral Berwick Curtis CB CMG DSO*
- Born: 9 October 1876
- Died: 9 May 1965 (aged 88)
- Military career
- Allegiance: United Kingdom
- Branch: Royal Navy
- Service years: 1896 – 1945
- Rank: Vice-Admiral
- Conflicts: World War I; World War II
- Awards: Order of the Bath; Order of St Michael and St George; Distinguished Service Order & Bar; Order of St Stanislas 2nd Class (Russia)

Vice-Admiral Berwick Curtis CB CMG DSO* (9 October 1876 – 9 May 1965) was a British Royal Navy officer.

Curtis was educated at HMS Britannia and was commissioned sub-lieutenant in May 1896. He was promoted lieutenant in December 1898, and from March 1903 served as 1st lieutenant aboard HMS Pylades on the Australia station. He was promoted to commander in 1911. During World War I he was promoted captain in 1916, mentioned in dispatches for his services at the Battle of Jutland, awarded the Distinguished Service Order (DSO) in May 1917 and bar in October 1917, and appointed Companion of the Order of the Bath (CB) in the 1919 New Year Honours. He also received the Russian Order of St Stanislas 2nd Class in June 1917.

During the Russian Civil War in 1919 he served as captain (D) commanding the Twentieth Destroyer Flotilla in the Baltic, for which he was appointed Companion of the Order of St Michael and St George (CMG) in January 1920. He personally commanded HMS Abdiel. The citation for his mention in despatches in March 1920 reads:

For valuable service in command of the Twentieth Destroyer Flotilla in the Baltic. The success of the operations connected with the relief of Riga was largely due to the perfect accord and co-operation which existed between the British Naval Forces under Captain Curtis and the French Naval Forces under Commodore Brisson.

He was promoted rear-admiral in 1928 and was appointed rear-admiral-in-charge and admiral-superintendent of Gibraltar Dockyard the following year. He held the position until 1931 and retired in September 1932 with the rank of vice-admiral. In the Second World War he returned to service as a commodore of convoys.
