= HMS Meteor (1914) =

Destroyer of the Royal Navy

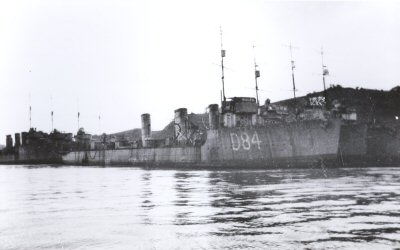
- Meteor laid up in 1920

History

United Kingdom
- Name: HMS Meteor
- Builder: Thornycroft & Company, Southampton
- Laid down: 8 May 1913
- Launched: 24 July 1914
- Commissioned: 15 September 1914
- Fate: Sold for breaking up 9 May 1921

General characteristics
- Class & type: Thornycroft M-class destroyer
- Displacement: 1,004 tons
- Length: 274 ft (84 m) o/a
- Beam: 27 ft 3 in (8.31 m)
- Draught: 10 ft 6 in (3.20 m)
- Propulsion: Brown-Curtis steam turbines; 26,500 shp; 2 shafts
- Speed: 35 kn (65 km/h)
- Range: 255 tons of oil
- Complement: 78
- Armament: 3 × QF 4-inch (101.6 mm) Mark IV guns, mounting P Mk.IX; 1 × single QF 2-pounder "pom-pom" Mk.II; 2 × twin 21 inch (533 mm) torpedo tubes

HMS Meteor was a Thornycroft M-class destroyer that served in the British Royal Navy. Meteor saw extensive service throughout World War I, maintaining continuous operations both as a convoy escort and in harbour protection.

== Construction ==
Meteor was one of a pair of destroyers ordered from Thornycroft & Company as part of the 1913–14 construction programme for the Royal Navy. The two ships, Meteor and Mastiff, were to a modified design tendered by Thornycroft which was more powerful and faster than the standard Admiralty design. (Note: As well as the two Thornycroft ships, "specials" were also ordered from Hawthorn Leslie (two ships) and Yarrow (three ships), with six ships to the standard Admiralty design.) In order to speed construction, initial payments were made prior to the formal order being placed. Meteor was laid down at Thornycroft's Southampton shipyard on 17 May 1913, launched on 24 July 1914 and completed in September 1914 at a contract price of £127,060.

Meteor was 274 feet 4 inches (83.62 m) long overall, with a beam of 27 feet 3 inches (8.31 m) and a draught of 10 feet (3.05 m). Displacement was 985 long tons (1,001 t) normal and 1,112 long tons (1,130 t) deep load. (Note: McBride lists a displacement of 980 long tons (1,000 t) for Mentor compared with 985 long tons (1,001 t) for sister ship Mastiff.) Four Yarrow three-drum boilers fed two sets of Parsons steam turbines rated at 26,500 shaft horsepower (19,800 kW), giving a design speed of 35 knots (65 km/h; 40 mph). Up to 202 tons of oil could be carried, giving an endurance of 1,540 nautical miles (2,850 km; 1,770 mi) at 15 knots (28 km/h; 17 mph). The ship's crew consisted of 82 officers and men. Armament consisted of three QF 4-inch (102 mm) Mk IV guns mounted on the ships centreline, and four 21 inch (533 mm) torpedo tubes in two twin mounts. In 1917, Meteor was converted to a minelayer, being capable of carrying 40 mines. (Note: Friedman states that the conversion allowed 38 mines to be carried.)

== Service history ==
Meteor served with the Harwich Force 1914–1917. On 17 October 1914 Meteor was taking part in a regular patrol with the light cruiser Arethusa (flying the flag of Reginald Tyrwhitt, commander of the Harwich Force) and the destroyers Laforey, Lawford and Miranda on the Broad Fourteens in the Southern North Seas, when suspicious radio signals were received by Lawford. The force soon intercepted the German hospital ship Ophelia and when Meteor approached the German ship for boarding and inspection it was observed that Ophelia's commander, Dr. Pfeiffer, threw overboard a number of documents and secret codes. Ophelia was seized by the British as a spy ship and renamed SS Huntly.

On 23 January 1915, the German battlecruisers under Admiral Franz von Hipper made a sortie to attack British fishing boats on the Dogger Bank. British Naval Intelligence was warned of the raid by radio messages decoded by Room 40, and sent out the Battlecruiser Force from Rosyth, commanded by Admiral Beatty aboard Lion and the Harwich Force, commanded by Commodore Reginald Tyrwhitt aboard the light cruiser Arethusa were sent out to intercept the German force. Meteor was one of seven M-class destroyers sailing with the Harwich Force. The British and German Forces met on the morning of 24 January in the Battle of Dogger Bank. On sighting the British, Hipper ordered his ships to head south-east to escape the British, who set off in pursuit. Being the fastest destroyers available to the British, the seven M-class were sent ahead to report the strength of the German forces. Although briefly forced to turn away by fire from the armoured cruiser Blücher, they managed to successfully report the German's strength and course before being ordered to pull back and take up station ahead of the British line as Beatty's battlecruisers came into gun range of the German ships. At about 09:20, German destroyers appeared to be preparing a torpedo attack, and the British destroyers were ordered ahead of the line in order to prevent such an attack. Only the M-class destroyers had sufficient speed to respond and slowly draw ahead of the British battlecruisers, but no attack by German destroyers followed. Later, at about 11:00, an emergency turn to avoid a non-existent German submarine and misinterpretation of signals from Lion caused the British battlecruisers to concentrate on Blücher, already badly damaged and trailing well behind the other German ships, and allowing the rest of Hipper's fleet to escape. Meteor led three other destroyers in a torpedo attack against Blücher but was hit by a shell in the forward boiler room which knocked her out of action, killing four and wounding two. Blücher was eventually overwhelmed by British shells and torpedoes, sinking at 12:10, while Meteor was towed back to the Humber by the destroyer Liberty.

By June 1915, Meteor had joined the 10th Destroyer Flotilla, and was part of the escort for three minelayers, that laid a field of 1450 mines in the North Sea on 10 September 1915. Meteor was part of the escort for the seaplane carrier HMS Vindex when Vindex launched an unsuccessful air attack against a German Zeppelin base believed to be at Hoyer in Schleswig-Holstein on 25–25 March 1916. Only two out of five seaplanes dispatched returned, reporting that the Zeppelin base was in fact at Tondern, but that they were unable to attack the base. Two German patrol boats were sunk by ships of the escort which were searching for the missing seaplanes, but the destroyer Medusa was rammed and badly damaged by Laverock and eventually had to be scuttled, while the cruisers Cleopatra and Undaunted also collided, badly damaging Undaunted.

On the night of 23/24 January 1917, the Harwich Force was ordered to intercept a German destroyer flotilla that was being transferred to Zeebrugge, with Meteor part of a group of destroyers patrolling off the River Maas. The German destroyers ran into a cruiser division, with the destroyer SMS V69 heavily damaged, but the Germans managed to escape, and the British destroyers, including Meteor dispersed from their patrol positions after hearing the noise of the engagement, allowing the German ships to slip through. One German straggler, SMS S50 encountered a British destroyer patrol and sank the destroyer Simoom before escaping.

Meteor joined the Sixth Destroyer Flotilla, part of the Dover Patrol in February 1917. Meteor was mined on 13 March 1917, but had returned to operations with the Sixth Destroyer Flotilla by July 1917. On the night of 13/14 July 1917, Meteor took part along with three other destroyers (including Telemachus and Tarpon) in laying a minefield off Ostend, during which operation Tarpon struck a mine and was badly damaged. Meteor, along with other minelaying destroyers based at Dover, carried out a series of minelaying operations off Cap Gris Nez in the winter of 1917–1918. Meteor continued to carry out minelaying operations for the rest of the war, laying magnetic mines off Ostend during August 1918. In total, Meteor laid 1082 mines during the First World War.

The destroyer was sold for scrapping in May 1921.

== Sources ==
- Bacon, Reginald (1918). The Dover Patrol 1915–1917: Vol. I. London: Hutchinson & Co.
- Corbett, Julian S. (1921). History of the Great War: Naval Operations: Vol II. London: Longmans, Green and Co.
- Corbett, Julian S. (1923). History of the Great War: Naval Operations: Volume III. London: Longmans, Green & Co.
- Dittmar, F.J.; Colledge, J.J. (1972). British Warships 1914–1919. Shepperton, UK: Ian Allan. ISBN 0-7110-0380-7.
- Dorling, Taprell (1932). Endless Story: Being an account of the work of the Destroyers, Flotilla-Leaders, Torpedo-Boats and Patrol Boats in the Great War. London: Hodder and Stoughton.
- Friedman, Norman (2009). British Destroyers: From Earliest Days to the First World War. Barnsley, UK: Seaforth Publishing. ISBN 978-1-84832-049-9.
- Gardiner, Robert; Gray, Randal, eds. (1985). Conway's All the World's Fighting Ships 1906–1921. London: Conway Maritime Press. ISBN 0-85177-245-5.
- Massie, Robert K. (2007). Castles of Steel: Britain, Germany and the Winning of the Great War at Sea. London: Vintage Books. ISBN 978-0-099-52378-9.
- McBride, Keith (1991). "British 'M' Class Destroyers of 1913–14". In Gardiner, Robert (ed.). Warship 1991. London: Conway Maritime Press. pp. 34–49. ISBN 0-85177-582-9.
- Monograph No. 24: Home Waters—Part II.: September and October 1914 (PDF). Naval Staff Monographs (Historical). Vol. XI. The Naval Staff, Training and Staff Duties Division. 1924.
- Newbolt, Henry (1928). History of the Great War: Naval Operations: Volume IV. London: Longmans, Green & Co.
- Smith, Peter C. (2005). Into the Minefields: British Destroyer Minelaying 1916–1960. Barnsley, UK: Pen & Sword Maritime. ISBN 1-84415-271-5.
