= HMS Ferret (1911) =

Destroyer of the Royal Navy

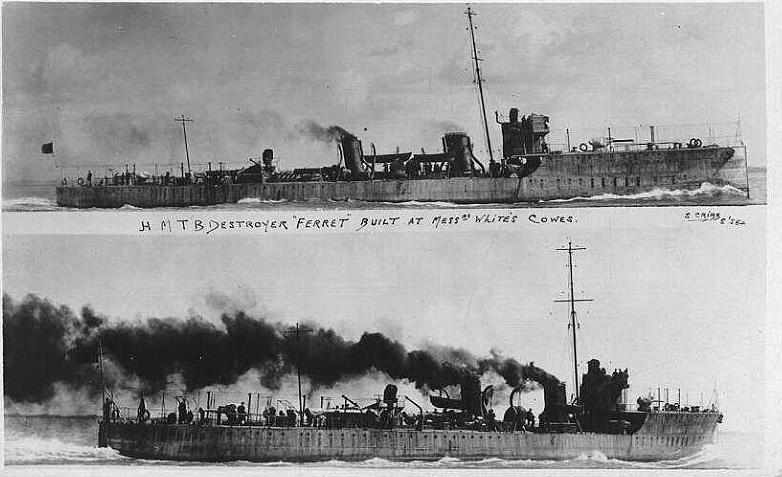
- HMS Ferret

History

United Kingdom
- Name: HMS Ferret
- Builder: J. Samuel White & Company, Cowes
- Launched: 12 April 1911
- Fate: Converted to fast minelayer in 1917; Sold May 1921

General characteristics
- Class & type: Acheron-class destroyer
- Displacement: 990 tons
- Length: 75 m (246 ft)
- Beam: 7.8 m (26 ft)
- Draught: 2.7 m (8.9 ft)
- Installed power: 13,500 shp (10,100 kW); Three White-Forster boilers (oil fired)
- Propulsion: Three Parsons Turbines; Three shafts
- Speed: 30 kn (56 km/h)
- Complement: 72
- Armament: 2 × BL 4-inch (101.6 mm) L/40 Mark VIII guns, mounting P Mark V; 2 × QF 12 pounder 12 cwt naval gun, mounting P Mark I; 2 × single tubes for 21 inch (533 mm) torpedoes

HMS Ferret was an Acheron-class destroyer of the Royal Navy that served during World War I and was sold for breaking in 1921. She was the sixteenth Royal Navy ship to be named after the domestic mammal Mustela putorius.

== Construction ==
She was built under the 1910–11 shipbuilding programme by J. Samuel White & Company of Cowes. She had three Parsons turbines, and three White-Forster boilers. Capable of 30 knots, she carried two 4-inch guns, other smaller guns and two 21 inch (533 mm) torpedo tubes and had a complement of 72 men. She was launched on 12 April 1911.

== Pennant numbers ==
Pennant Number	From	To
H35	6 December 1914	1 January 1918
H32	1 January 1918	Early 1919
H93	Early 1919	9 May 1921

== Career ==
=== Pre-War ===
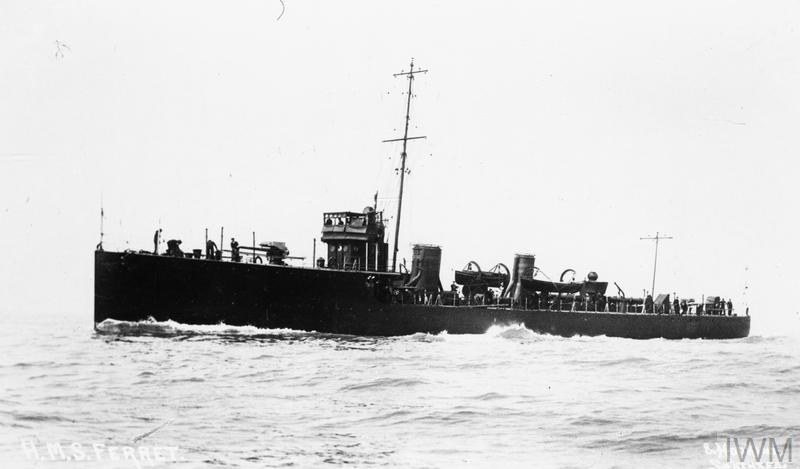
HMS Ferret

Ferret served with the First Destroyer Flotilla from 1911 and, with her flotilla, joined the British Grand Fleet in 1914 on the outbreak of World War I.

=== The Battle of Heligoland Bight ===
She was present with First Destroyer Flotilla on 28 August 1914 at the Battle of Heligoland Bight, led by the light cruiser Fearless, and shared in the prize money for the battle. Ferret was not present with her flotilla at the Battle of Jutland on 31 May 1916 but she continued to serve with the First Destroyer Flotilla screening the Grand Fleet until November 1916 when she was one of seven destroyers to stay with the flotilla when was assigned to operate with the Third Battle Squadron.

=== Torpedoed ===
On 18 January 1917 she was torpedoed by the German submarine UC 21 south-east of St. Catherine's Point. Able Seaman George Keeble died of wounds inflicted during the attack, but the ship was not fatally damaged, and she was returned to service.

=== Conversion to minelayer ===
In 1917 the Acheron-class destroyers Ferret, Sandfly and Ariel were converted to minelaying destroyers, capable of carrying 40 mines. Ferret started serving with the 7th Flotilla on the East Coast of England in July 1917 and thence to the 20th Flotilla in March 1918, from which she operated out of Immingham.

=== Minelaying operations in the Heligoland Bight ===
The provision of converted minelaying destroyers and the availability of reliable H2-pattern mines allowed the greatest allied minelaying operation of World War I - the attempt to close Heligoland Bight to German ships and submarines. Ferret, with her sisters, was employed on this work until the end of the war. On the night of 27/28 March 1918 while laying a barrier minefield 70 nautical miles (130 km) north-west of Heligoland, Ferret in company with Ariel, Abdiel, Legion and Telemachus came upon three armed German trawlers. All three vessels were sunk and 72 prisoners were captured.

== Disposal ==
In common with most of her class, she was laid up after World War I, and on 9 May 1921 she was sold to Ward for breaking.
