= HMS Ariel (1911) =

Destroyer of the Royal Navy

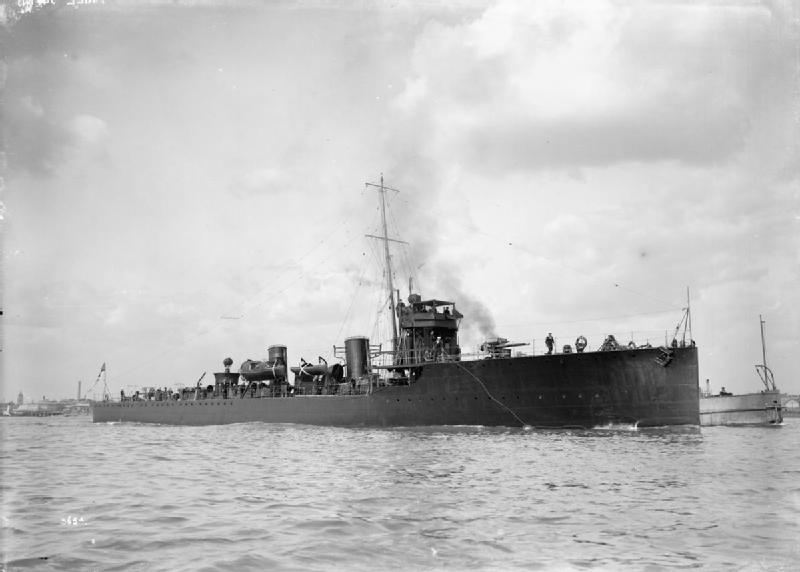
- HMS Ariel

History

United Kingdom
- Name: HMS Ariel
- Builder: John I. Thornycroft & Company, Woolston
- Launched: 26 September 1911
- Fate: Mined on 2 August 1918

General characteristics
- Class & type: Acheron-class destroyer
- Displacement: 770 long tons (780 t)
- Length: 250 ft (76 m)
- Beam: 26 ft (7.9 m)
- Draught: 8.9 ft (2.7 m)
- Installed power: 15,500 shp (11,600 kW)
- Propulsion: 3 × Parsons steam turbines; 3 × Yarrow boilers; 3 × shafts
- Speed: 29 kn (33 mph; 54 km/h)
- Range: 5,500 nmi (6,300 mi; 10,200 km) at 15 kn (17 mph; 28 km/h)
- Complement: 70
- Armament: 2 × BL 4 in (100 mm) L/40 Mark VIII guns; 2 × QF 12-pounder 12 cwt naval guns; 2 × 21 inch (533 mm) torpedo tubes

HMS Ariel was an Acheron-class destroyer built in 1911, which served during the First World War and sank in 1918 after striking a mine. Named after Shakespeare's "airy spirit", or the biblical spirit of the same name, she was the tenth and last ship of the name to serve in the Royal Navy.

== Construction ==
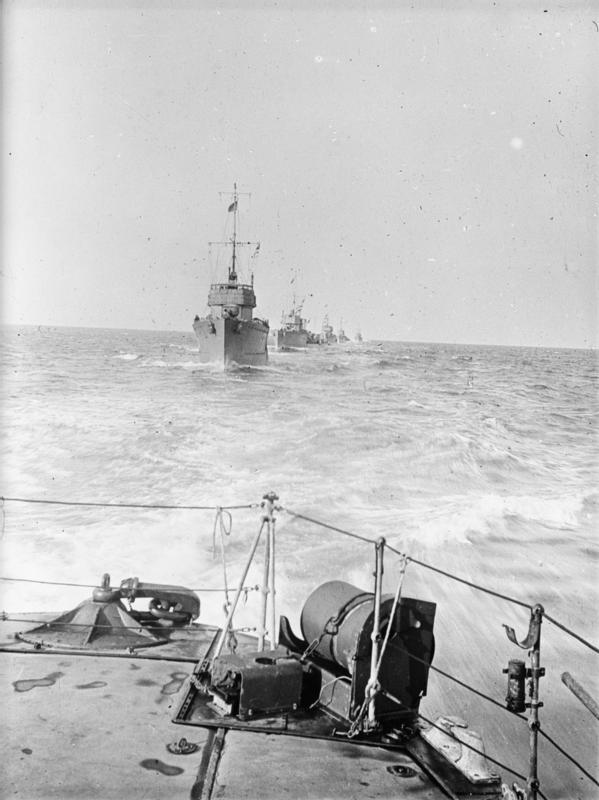
Destroyers of the Harwich Flotilla

With her sister, Acheron, she was a "Thornycroft special", and as such was slightly longer and more powerful than the standard destroyer of her class. Ariel was laid down at the Woolston yard of John I. Thornycroft & Company, and launched on 26 September 1911. Capable of 29 kn (54 km/h; 33 mph), she carried two 4 in (100 mm) guns, other smaller guns and 21-inch (533 mm) torpedo tubes and had a complement of 70 men.

== Pennant numbers ==
Pennant Number	From	To
H11	6 December 1914	1 September 1915
H37	1 September 1915	1 January 1918
H07	1 January 1918	Sunk 2 August 1918

== Career ==
As part of the First Destroyer Flotilla, she was attached to the Grand Fleet in August 1914, and then to the Third Battle Squadron from the spring of 1916. Once converted to a minelayer in 1917, she became part of the 20th Flotilla.

=== Establishing the Heligoland Bight patrol ===
On 5 August 1914, Ariel towed submarine E8 to Terschelling. They were in company with cruiser Amethyst and submarine E6. After releasing the tow, the two submarines conducted the first Heligoland Bight patrol of the war.

=== Battle of Heligoland Bight ===
As part of the Harwich Force, the First Destroyer Flotilla took part in the Battle of Heligoland Bight on 28 August. Ariel — under Commander Dashwood Moir — shared in the prize money for the battle.

=== Battle of Dogger Bank ===
On 24 January 1915, Ariel took part in the Battle of Dogger Bank as part of the First Destroyer Flotilla, with Aurora as flotilla leader. Aurora was the first British ship to engage the German ships as she encountered Hipper's screening vessels at the Dogger Bank at 07:05.

=== Sinking of U-12 ===
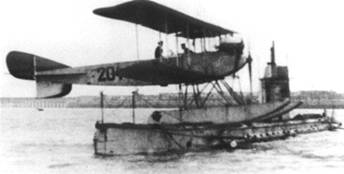
U-12 shown with seaplane on deck

On 10 March, in company with her sisters Attack and Acheron, Ariel was searching for a German submarine reported by the trawler Man Island near Aberdeen. At 10:10, Attack sighted U-12 and opened fire. Ariel, commanded by Lt Cdr J V Creagh, sighted the submarine at 10:12 at about 2 nmi (3.7 km; 2.3 mi) and all three destroyers turned towards it. U-12 dived and raised her periscope, which Ariel sighted at a distance of 200 yd (180 m). She turned to ram, sighting the conning tower under the water in the final moments before she struck the submarine at a fine angle. Within two minutes, the submarine had returned to the surface so that the crew could escape, but they found the conning tower hatch jammed, and most of the survivors managed their escape via the other hatches. The destroyers opened fire as the submarine lay on the surface, killing and injuring some of the escaping sailors. At 10:30, U-12 sank approximately in position 56°15′N 1°56′W, and the destroyers picked up 10 survivors; 19 lives had been lost. The damage to Ariel's bow was so serious that she had to be towed into port.

=== Battle of Jutland ===
Ariel was present at the Battle of Jutland on 31 May 1916 under the command of Lieutenant Commander Tippet as part of the First Destroyer Flotilla, led by Fearless.

=== Sinking of UC-19 ===
On 6 December 1916, UC-19 sank the Russian sailing ship Ans (Later claimed to have been sunk by UB-29). The P&O vessel Kashmir sent out a radio warning, and later the same day Ariel's lookouts spotted the conning tower of a submarine. A depth charge was dropped in the position of the submarine, but it failed to explode. Ariel's explosive paravane was deployed, and after an explosion at about 30 ft (9.1 m), oil and bubbles were observed. Twenty-five German sailors were killed, and UC-19 now lies in about 330 ft (100 m) of water in an approximate position of 49°41′N 06°31′W.

=== Conversion to minelayer ===
In 1917, the Acheron-class destroyers Ferret, Sandfly and Ariel were converted to minelaying destroyers, capable of carrying 40 mines. Ariel served with the 20th Flotilla, and operated out of Immingham.

=== Minelaying operations in the Heligoland Bight ===
The provision of converted minelaying destroyers and the availability of reliable H2-pattern mines allowed the greatest allied minelaying operation of the First World War — the attempt to close Heligoland Bight to German ships and submarines. Ariel — with her sisters — was employed on this work until the end of the war. On 27 March 1918, while laying a barrier minefield 70 nmi (81 mi; 130 km) north-west of Heligoland, Ariel — in company with Ferret, Abdiel, Legion and Telemachus — came upon three armed German trawlers, Polarstern, Mars and Scharbentz. All three vessels were sunk and 72 prisoners were captured.

=== Loss ===
On 2 August, while conducting minelaying in the western end of the Heligoland Bight, the V-class destroyer Vehement sank after striking a German mine. In attempting to exit the minefield, Ariel lost her bow and sank in less than an hour. 49 people died, including her commanding officer, Lieutenant Frank A Rothera.
