= HMS Nimrod (1915) =

WWI British Royal Navy flotilla leader

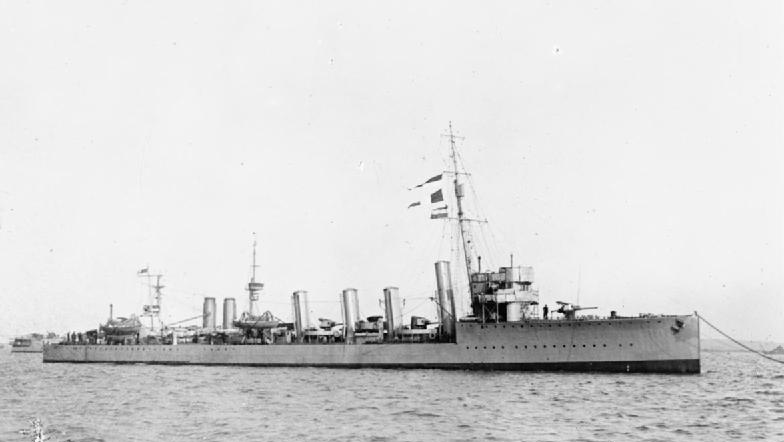

History

United Kingdom
- Name: HMS Nimrod
- Builder: William Denny and Brothers, Dumbarton
- Laid down: 9 October 1914
- Launched: 12 April 1915
- Commissioned: 25 August 1915
- Fate: Sold for scrap 5 November 1926

General characteristics
- Class & type: Marksman-class flotilla leader
- Displacement: 1,440 long tons (1,460 t) normal; 1,700 long tons (1,700 t) deep load
- Length: 324 ft 10 in (99.01 m) (overall)
- Beam: 31 ft 9 in (9.68 m)
- Draught: 12 ft (3.66 m)
- Propulsion: Three shafts; Brown-Curtis steam turbines; Four Yarrow boilers; 36,000 shp (27,000 kW)
- Speed: 34 kn (63 km/h; 39 mph)
- Range: 4,290 nmi (7,950 km; 4,940 mi) at 15 knots (28 km/h; 17 mph)
- Complement: 104
- Armament: 4 × QF 4-inch (102 mm) Mark IV guns; 2 × single 2-pounder (40-mm) "pom-pom" Mk. II; 2 × twin 21-inch (533 mm) torpedo tubes

HMS Nimrod was a Marksman-class flotilla leader (Note: Also known as the Lightfoot-class or the Kempenfelt-class.) of the British Royal Navy. She was built by the Scottish shipbuilder Denny, with construction starting in 1914 and completed in August 1915. She served through the remainder of the First World War. She was sold for scrap in 1921.

== Construction and design ==
The British Admiralty issued requests for tenders for two flotilla leaders of the Marksman-class, Nimrod and Kempenfelt, in April 1914 as part of the 1914–1915 Naval Estimates, as a follow-on to the orders placed for the two ships of the class (Note: Lightfoot and Marksman) in the 1913–1914 Estimates. Flotilla Leaders were large destroyer-type vessels intended to lead flotillas of smaller destroyers in action.

The Marksman-class ships were 324 feet 10 inches (99.01 m) long overall, 324 feet (99 m) at the waterline and 315 feet 0 inches (96.01 m) between perpendiculars. They had a beam of 31 feet 9 inches (9.68 m) and a draught of 12 feet 0 inches (3.66 m). The design displacement was 1,440 long tons (1,460 t) normal and 1,700 long tons (1,700 t) full load, with a displacement of 1,608 long tons (1,634 t) stated for Nimrod in 1919. Three sets of Brown-Curtis steam turbines were fed by four Yarrow three-drum boilers, rated at 36,000 shaft horsepower (27,000 kW), which gave a speed of 34 knots (63 km/h; 39 mph). Cruising turbines were fitted to the outer shafts. Four funnels were fitted. Up to 515 tons of oil fuel could be carried, giving a range of 4,290 nautical miles (7,950 km; 4,940 mi) at 15 knots (28 km/h; 17 mph).

The ship's main gun armament consisted of four QF 4-inch (102 mm) Mk IV guns mounted on the ships centreline, with two of the guns positioned between the ship's funnels. An anti-aircraft armament of two 1-pounder (37 mm) "pom-pom" autocannons was planned, but during construction the 1-pounder pom-poms were diverted to the British Expeditionary Force when it deployed to France at the start of the First World War, and the ship completed with two 2-pounder (40-mm) "pom-pom"s instead. Torpedo armament consisted of two twin 21-inch (533 mm) torpedo tubes. By November 1915, Nimrod carried Type E depth charges to attack submarines. In 1917 Nimrod was fitted with two 14-inch torpedo-tubes for short-range night engagements. (The existing 21-inch torpedoes tended to dive too steeply to hit close-in targets). The ship's crew was 104 officers and men.

Nimrod was laid down at Denny's Dumbarton shipyard on 9 October 1914 and was launched on 12 April 1915. She reached a speed of 32.46 knots (60.12 km/h; 37.35 mph) during sea trials. The ship was completed on 25 August 1915.

== Service ==
=== 1915 ===
On commissioning, Nimrod joined the 10th Destroyer Flotilla, part of the Harwich Force as Second leader. On the night of 10/11 September 1915, the Harwich Force sailed in support of a major minelaying operation near the Amrum Bank in the North Sea. Nimrod and five destroyers accompanied the light cruisers of the 5th Cruiser Squadron, which screened the minelaying force to the south, while six destroyers of the Harwich force provided a close escort to the minelayers Princess Margaret, Angora and Orvieto, while battlecruisers and light cruisers from Rosyth covered the operation from the North. The operation was a success, with 1450 mines being laid and the cruiser force encountering and sinking a German trawler on the outward journey. On 6 October, Nimrod took part in a sweep by the Harwich Force towards Hanstholm in Denmark. The force captured 16 German trawlers, of which 15 were sent back to England, with the remaining one being sunk as it was short of fuel. In December 1915 Nimrod led eight destroyers that were temporarily detached from the Harwich Force for operations in the English Channel and Western Approaches as a response to attacks on shipping by the German submarine U-24.

=== 1916 ===
Nimrod continued with operations as part of the Harwich force in 1916, and on 14–15 March that year, was part of the escort for the minelayer Biarritz as she laid mines in the Heligoland Bight. On 24–26 March 1916 most of the Harwich Force, including Nimrod, formed the escort for the seaplane carrier Vindex as Vindex carried out an air raid against a German Zeppelin base that was believed to be at Hoyer in Schleswig-Holstein. Vindex launched five seaplanes on the morning of 25 March, but only two returned at the appointed time, reporting that the Zeppelin base was at Tondern rather than Hoyer, and that they had been unable to attack it. Commodore Reginald Tyrwhitt, commander of the Harwich Force, ordered some of his destroyers to search for the overdue three aircraft. No sign of the missing seaplanes were found (they had, in fact, ditched due to engine trouble, and their crews captured by the Germans) but the force did encounter two German patrol boats which they sank. After the two patrol boats were sunk, Nimrod ordered the destroyers to cease firing and resume formation, but this resulted in the destroyer Laverock colliding with Medusa. While damage to Laverock was confined to her bows, Medusa had been holed in her engine room and was taken in tow by the Flotilla leader Lightfoot, but due to the severe weather, Medusa eventually had to be scuttled. During the return journey of Tyrwhitt's force, the cruisers Cleopatra and Undaunted also collided, badly damaging Undaunted, shortly after Cleopatra rammed and sunk the German destroyer G194.

On 24 April 1916, a force of German battlecruisers and cruiser set out from Kiel to bombard the coastal towns of Lowestoft and Yarmouth. Later that day, the German battlecruiser Seydlitz struck a mine, and the resultant radio traffic warned the British of the German operation. The light cruisers and five destroyers of the Harwich Force left port at midnight on the night of 24/25 April, with Nimrod leading eight more destroyers leaving Harwich at 01:00hr. Five more destroyers joined later. Nimrod's division had just joined up with the light cruisers of the Harwich Force when the German raiding force was sighted. Heavily outnumbered, Tyrwhitt turned away in an attempt to lure the German forces away from Lowestoft, but the Germans ignored this move and shelled Lowestoft before moving North towards their next target, Yarmouth. On observing this Tyrwhitt again turned his ships in pursuit of the raiders, and engaged the light cruisers screening the German force just as the German battlecruisers started to shell Yarmouth. The German battlecruisers aborted their bombardment to engage the Harwich force, hitting the cruiser Conquest and the destroyer Laertes but retired to the East rather than attempt to destroy the smaller British force. Nimrod was undamaged.

One of the duties of the Harwich Force destroyers was the so-called "Beef Run", convoys to and from The Netherlands. On 7 September 1916, Nimrod was leading the escort of a convoy back to England when a German submarine attempted to torpedo the destroyer Lance, which retaliated with depth charges. On 9 September, when escorting another convoy, Nimrod spotted a German submarine off the Meuse (Dutch: Maas) estuary and attempted to ram, following this up with two depth charges. The submarine escaped unharmed. On 22 December 1916 Nimrod and eight destroyers of the 10th Flotilla were ordered to Dunkirk to guard against a suspected raid by German destroyers.

=== 1917 and 1918 ===
On 22 January 1917, the German Sixth Torpedo Boat Flotilla, consisting of 11 torpedo boats (equivalent in size and armament to British destroyers) set out from Helgoland to Flanders to reinforce the German torpedo boat forces based in the Belgian ports. Decoding of German radio signals by Room 40 warned the British of the German intentions and the Harwich Force was deployed to intercept the German ships on the night of 22/23 January. Nimrod was one of seven destroyers that were released back to the Harwich Force for this operation. The British set six light cruisers, two flotilla leaders and sixteen destroyers to intercept the eleven German ships, deploying them in several groups to make sure that all possible routes were covered. Nimrod led six destroyers that were to patrol east of the Schouwen Bank. The German destroyers ran into a cruiser division, with the destroyers V69 and G41 heavily damaged, but the Germans managed to escape under the cover of a smokescreen. Nimrod's group of destroyers headed north-east to cut-off the return route to the German Bight, but were ordered back to their station. The main group of German torpedo boats managed to sneak past the British patrols, but a straggler, S50, which was following the same route, ran into the five destroyers patrolling west of the Schouwen Bank. An exchange of fire followed, in which S50 was hit several times by British shells, but managed to torpedo the British destroyer Simoom. Nimrod's division spotted the fighting and came up from the east, and had just opened fire on S50, which had turned to the east, when the British destroyer Starfish of the western group, passed through Nimrod's division, narrowly avoiding ramming Moorsom, fouling Nimrod's line of fire. S50 escaped in the confusion, returning to Germany. Nimrod attempted to take the stricken Simoom under tow, but these attempts failed, and Simoom was scuttled by gunfire from Matchless.

On 12 March 1917 the destroyer Skate was torpedoed by the German submarine UC-69 near the Maas light vessel while escorting an east-bound convoy to the Netherlands. Nimrod, leading the escort of the corresponding west-bound convoy, took Skate under tow and brought her back to Harwich. On 22 May the Dover Patrol carried out a bombardment of the German held Belgian port of Zeebrugge, using the monitors Erebus, Terror and Marshal Soult, with the hope of destroying the locks on the canal that linked Zeebrugge to Bruges. The Harwich Force supplied two leaders (Nimrod and Lightfoot) and twelve destroyers to support the operation. Nimrod led four destroyers that formed the anti-submarine screen for the operation. The operation failed to hit the locks. On 25 July 1917 the Dover Patrol laid a mine-net barrage off the Belgian coast between Nieuport and Zeebrugge, with Nimrod and eight destroyers detached from the Harwich Force to support the operation. In October 1917, Nimrod formed part of a large-scale operation, involving 30 cruisers and 54 destroyers deployed in eight groups across the North Sea in an attempt to stop a suspected sortie by German naval forces. Despite these countermeasures, the two German light cruisers Bremse and Brummer, managed to evade the patrols and attacked the regular convoy between Norway and Britain, sinking nine merchant ships and two destroyers, Mary Rose and Strongbow before returning safely to Germany.

Nimrod was still part of the 10th Destroyer Flotilla in January 1918, but by February she was listed as part of the 11th Destroyer Flotilla of the Grand Fleet, while in March she was a member of the newly established Third Destroyer Flotilla, also part of the Grand Fleet. Nimrod remained part of the Grand Fleet until the end of the war.

=== Post-war and disposal ===
By March 1919, Nimrod was listed as a tender to the depot ship Woolwich, and by June that year she was in reserve at Portsmouth. She was sold for scrap to the Alloa Ship Breaking Company of Rosyth on 5 November 1926. (Note: Friedman says that Nimrod was sold in November 1921.)

== Bibliography ==
- Corbett, Julian S. (1923). History of the Great War: Naval Operations: Vol. III. London: Longmans, Green and Co.
- Dittmar, F.J.; Colledge, J.J. (1972). British Warships 1914–1919. Shepperton, UK: Ian Allan. ISBN 0-7110-0380-7.
- Dorling, Taprell (1932). Endless Story: Being an Account of the Work of the Destroyers, Flotilla-Leaders, Torpedo-Boats and Patrol Boats in the Great War. London: Hodder and Stoughton.
- Friedman, Norman (2009). British Destroyers: From Earliest Days to the First World War. Barnsley, UK: Seaforth Publishing. ISBN 978-1-84832-049-9.
- Gardiner, Robert; Gray, Randal, eds. (1985). Conway's All the World's Fighting Ships 1906–1921. London: Conway Maritime Press. ISBN 0-85177-245-5.
- Karau, Mark K. (2014). The Naval Flank of the Western Front: The German MarineKorps Flandern 1914–1918. Barnsley, UK: Seaforth Publishing. ISBN 978-1-84832-231-8.
- Jones, H. A. (1928). History of the Great War:The War in the Air: Being the Story of the Part Played in the Great War by the Royal Air Force: Vol. II. Oxford: Clarendon Press.
- Manning, T. D. (1961). The British Destroyer. London: Putnam.
- Massie, Robert K. (2007). Castles of Steel. London: Vintage Books. ISBN 978-0-099-52378-9.
- Monograph No. 30: Home Waters—Part V: From July to October 1915 (PDF). Naval Staff Monographs (Historical). Vol. XIV. The Naval Staff, Training and Staff Duties Division. 1926.
- Monograph No. 31: Home Waters—Part VI: From October 1915 to May 1916 (PDF). Naval Staff Monographs (Historical). Vol. XV. The Naval Staff, Training and Staff Duties Division. 1926.
- Monograph No. 32: Lowestoft Raid: 24th – 25th April, 1916 (PDF). Naval Staff Monographs (Historical). Vol. XVI. The Naval Staff, Training and Staff Duties Division. 1927.
- Monograph No. 33: Home Waters—Part VII: From June 1916 to November 1916 (PDF). Naval Staff Monographs (Historical). Vol. XVII. The Naval Staff, Training and Staff Duties Division. 1927.
- Monograph No. 34: Home Waters—Part VIII: December 1916 to April 1917 (PDF). Naval Staff Monographs (Historical). Vol. XVIII. The Naval Staff, Training and Staff Duties Division. 1933.
- Monograph No. 35: Home Waters—Part IX: 1 May 1917 to 31st July 1917 (PDF). Naval Staff Monographs (Historical). Vol. XIX. The Naval Staff, Training and Staff Duties Division. 1939.
- Moore, John (1990). Jane's Fighting Ships of World War I. London: Studio. ISBN 1-85170-378-0.
- Newbolt, Henry (1928). History of the Great War: Naval Operations: Vol. IV. London: Longmans, Green & Co.
