= HMS Marksman (1915) =

Destroyer of the Royal Navy

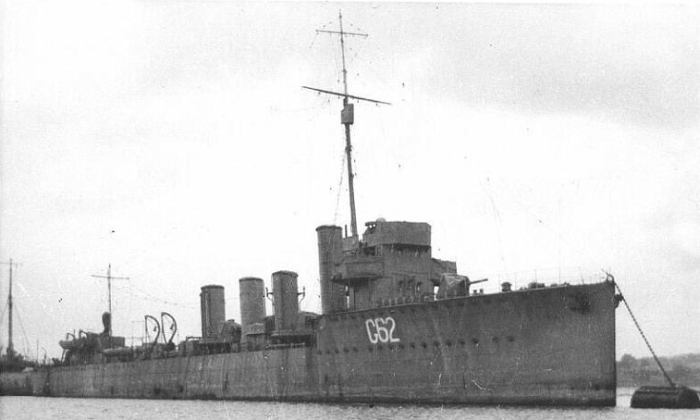

History

United Kingdom
- Name: HMS Marksman
- Builder: Hawthorn Leslie and Company, Newcastle upon Tyne
- Laid down: 20 July 1914
- Launched: 12 May 1915
- Commissioned: 18 November 1915
- Fate: Sold for scrap 8 November 1921

General characteristics
- Class & type: Marksman-class flotilla leader
- Displacement: 1,440 long tons (1,460 t) normal; 1,700 long tons (1,700 t) deep load
- Length: 324 ft 10 in (99.01 m) (overall)
- Beam: 31 ft 9 in (9.68 m)
- Draught: 12 ft (3.66 m)
- Propulsion: Three shafts; Brown-Curtis steam turbines; Four Yarrow boilers; 36,000 shp (27,000 kW)
- Speed: 34 kn (63 km/h; 39 mph)
- Range: 4,290 nmi (7,950 km; 4,940 mi) at 15 knots (28 km/h; 17 mph)
- Complement: 104
- Armament: 4 × QF 4-inch (102 mm) Mark IV guns; 2 × single 2-pounder (40-mm) "pom-pom" Mk. II; 2 × twin 21-inch (533 mm) torpedo tubes

HMS Marksman was a Marksman-class flotilla leader (Note: Also known as the Lightfoot-class or the Kempenfelt-class.) of the British Royal Navy. Construction at Hawthorn Leslie's Newcastle upon Tyne shipyard began in 1914, shortly before the outbreak of the First World War, and the ship was launched and completed in 1915. She took part in the Battle of Jutland in 1916 and survived the war. She was sold for scrap in 1921.

== Construction and design ==
The British Admiralty ordered the first two ships of the new Marksman-class flotilla leaders under the 1913–14 Construction Programme. Flotilla Leaders were large destroyer-type vessels intended to lead flotillas of smaller destroyers in action. The two ships, Lightfoot and Marksman, were intended to lead the 1st and 3rd Destroyer Flotillas, and so had names to match the L and M-class destroyers that would equip these flotillas.

The Marksman-class ships were 324 feet 10 inches (99.01 m) long overall, 324 feet (99 m) at the waterline and 315 feet 0 inches (96.01 m) between perpendiculars. They had a beam of 31 feet 9 inches (9.68 m) and a draught of 12 feet 0 inches (3.66 m). The design displacement was 1,440 long tons (1,460 t) normal and 1,700 long tons (1,700 t) full load, with a displacement of 1,604 long tons (1,630 t) stated for Marksman in 1919. Three sets of Brown-Curtis steam turbines were fed by four Yarrow three-drum boilers, rated at 36,000 shaft horsepower (27,000 kW), which gave a speed of 34 knots (63 km/h; 39 mph). Cruising turbines were fitted to the outer shafts. Four funnels were fitted. Up to 515 tons of oil fuel could be carried, giving a range of 4,290 nautical miles (7,950 km; 4,940 mi) at 15 knots (28 km/h; 17 mph).

The ship's main gun armament consisted of four QF 4-inch (102 mm) Mk IV guns mounted on the ships centreline, with two of the guns positioned between the ship's funnels. An anti-aircraft armament of two 1-pounder (37 mm) "pom-pom" autocannons was planned, but during construction the 1-pounder pom-poms were diverted to the British Expeditionary Force when it deployed to France at the start of the First World War, and the ship completed with two 2-pounder (40-mm) "pom-pom"s instead. Torpedo armament consisted of two twin 21-inch (533 mm) torpedo tubes. The ship's crew was 104 officers and men.

Marksman was laid down at Hawthorn Leslie's Newcastle upon Tyne shipyard on 20 July 1914, was launched on 12 May 1915 and completed on 18 November 1915.

== Service ==
On commissioning, Marksman joined the newly established 12th Destroyer Flotilla of the Grand Fleet as leader. By May 1916, the arrival of Faulknor saw Marksman being relegated to second in command of the Flotilla, with the Captain (D) transferring to Faulknor.

Marksman was still part of the 12th Destroyer Flotilla at the Battle of Jutland on 31 May-1 June 1916, operating in support of the Grand Fleet. During the night of the battle, the flotilla was still largely intact, with Faulknor leading eight destroyers and Marksman following with a further four (Opal, Menace, Munster and Mary Rose). At about 01:43 hr Greenwich Mean Time (GMT) (02:43 CET), Faulknor spotted a group of German battleships and manoeuvred to set up a torpedo attack. While doing so, Faulknor carried out a 180 degree turn which resulting in steering towards Marksman and her destroyers. In avoiding collision, Marksman lost touch both with the enemy and her four destroyers, and so did not take place in the flotilla's torpedo attack, which resulted in the German pre-dreadnought battleship Pommern being sunk. Marksman later (at between 02:15 and 02:25 GMT) joined up with the cruiser Champion and some destroyers of the 13th Flotilla, and at about 03:25 got into a brief exchange of fire with four German destroyers, during which several torpedoes fired at the British ships missed, while one of the German destroyers (G40) was damaged by Champion's fire. Marksman picked up a single survivor, the ship's captain, from the sunken destroyer Ardent, with two more picked up by the destroyer Obdurate. At 06:00 the badly damaged destroyer Sparrowhawk was encountered and Marksman attempted to take her under tow, but this failed. After taking off Sparrowhawk's crew, Marksman scuttled Sparrowhawk with gunfire.

In mid-July 1916, in response to an intelligence report that a German commerce raider was about to set out on a raid, a large scale operation was launched by the Royal Navy to prevent a breakout into the Atlantic involving 14 cruisers, 13 armed merchant cruisers and 18 destroyers. As part of these operations, Marksman and sister ship Gabriel patrolled the Fair Isle channel between the Orkney and Shetland Islands from 11 to 13 July. Nothing was found by these operations.

Marksman remained part of the 12th Flotilla well into 1917, transferring to the 6th Destroyer Flotilla, part of the Dover Patrol, on 26 August 1917. Large destroyers and leaders like Marksman tended to be employed on patrols along two routes to protect the Dover Barrage, the West Barrage Patrol and the East Barrage Patrol. On the night of 14/15 February 1918, Marksman and Swift were on the West Barrage Patrol while a further four destroyers formed the East Barrage Patrol, when seven German torpedo boats (equivalent to British destroyers) attacked the Dover Barrage. None of the defensive forces managed to interfere with the German attack, which sank one trawler and seven drifters while severely damaging a further one trawler, five drifters and one minesweeper.

On 23 March 1918, Marksman left the 6th Destroyer Flotilla and rejoined the Grand Fleet as part of the 11th Destroyer Flotilla. In July 1918, Marksman transferred to the Northern Patrol and on 12 July 1918 she led a major operation to intercept the homewards bound German cruiser submarine U-151 between the Shetland and Faeroe Islands. The submarine was detected by hydrophones of the force near the island of Suðuroy and the destroyer Beagle dropped depth charges twice, but U-151 escaped unharmed. Marksman remained with the Northern Patrol force until the end of the war. On 1 November 1918, Marksman collided with the Naval trawler Charles Hammond off Kirkcaldy, Scotland. Charles Hammond sank early in the morning of the next day, while Marksman was under repair at Leith until 31 December 1918.

== Disposal ==
Marksman was paid off at Devonport on 25 November 1919, and was sold for scrap on 8 November 1921 and broken up in Germany.

== Pennant numbers ==
| Pennant number | From | To |
|---|---|---|
| H96 | 1915 | 1917 |
| G35 | 1917 | January 1918 |
| F85 | January 1918 | April 1918 |
| G23 | April 1918 | September 1918 |
| F66 | September 1918 | Decommissioning |

== Bibliography ==
- Bacon, Reginald (1919). The Dover Patrol 1915–1917 Volume II. London: Hutchinson & Son. OCLC 867981501.
- Battle of Jutland, 30th May to 1st June 1916: Official Despatches with Appendices. London: His Majesty's Stationery Office. 1920.
- Campbell, John (1998). Jutland: An Analysis of the Fighting. London: Conway Maritime Press. ISBN 0-85177-750-3.
- Corbett, Julian S. (1923). History of the Great War: Naval Operations: Vol. III. London: Longmans, Green and Co.
- Dittmar, F.J.; Colledge, J.J. (1972). British Warships 1914–1919. Shepperton, UK: Ian Allan. ISBN 0-7110-0380-7.
- English, John (2019). Grand Fleet Destroyers: Part I: Flotilla Leaders and 'V/W' Class Destroyers. Windsor, UK: World Ship Society. ISBN 978-0-9650769-8-4.
- Friedman, Norman (2009). British Destroyers: From Earliest Days to the First World War. Barnsley, UK: Seaforth Publishing. ISBN 978-1-84832-049-9.
- Gardiner, Robert; Gray, Randal, eds. (1985). Conway's All the World's Fighting Ships 1906–1921. London: Conway Maritime Press. ISBN 0-85177-245-5.
- Grant, Robert M. (1964). U-Boats Destroyed: The Effect of Anti-Submarine Warfare 1914–1918. London: Putnam.
- Karau, Mark D. (2014). The Naval Flank of the Western Front: The German MarineKorps Flandern 1914–1918. Barnsley, UK: Seaforth Publishing. ISBN 978-1-84832-231-8.
- Manning, T. D. (1961). The British Destroyer. London: Putnam.
- Moore, John (1990). Jane's Fighting Ships of World War I. London: Studio. ISBN 1-85170-378-0.
- Monograph No. 33: Home Waters—Part VII: From June 1916 to November 1916 (PDF). Naval Staff Monographs (Historical). Vol. XVII. The Naval Staff, Training and Staff Duties Division. 1927.
