= HMS Torrid =

Destroyer of the Royal Navy

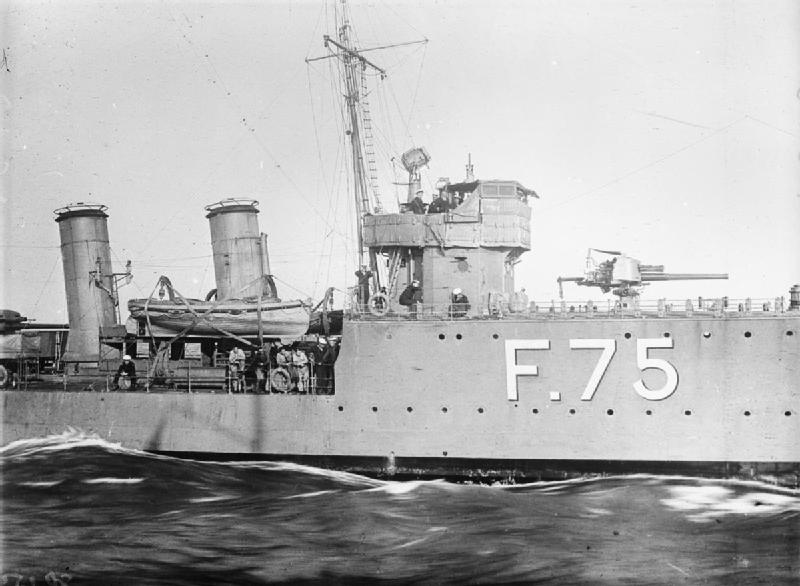
- HMS Torrid

History

United Kingdom
- Name: HMS Torrid
- Builder: Swan Hunter & Wigham Richardson, Wallsend
- Yard number: 1025
- Laid down: 19 July 1916
- Launched: 10 February 1917
- Completed: 5 May 1917
- Out of service: 27 January 1937
- Motto: For him dark days do not exist the brazen faced old optimist
- Fate: Wrecked 16 March 1937

General characteristics
- Class & type: R-class destroyer
- Displacement: 975 long tons (991 t)
- Length: 265 ft (80.8 m) p.p.
- Beam: 26 ft 7 in (8.10 m)
- Draught: 9 ft 8 in (2.95 m)
- Propulsion: 3 Brown-Curtis boilers; 2 geared Parsons steam turbines, 27,000 shp (20,000 kW)
- Speed: 36 knots (41.4 mph; 66.7 km/h)
- Range: 3,440 nmi (6,370 km) at 15 kn (28 km/h)
- Complement: 82
- Armament: 3 × QF 4-inch (101.6 mm) Mark IV guns, mounting P Mk. IX; 1 × single 2-pounder (40-mm) "pom-pom" Mk. II anti-aircraft gun; 4 × 21 in (533 mm) torpedo tubes (2×2)

HMS Torrid was an R-class destroyer which served with the Royal Navy during World War I. The ship was launched on 10 February 1917 and served as part of the Harwich Force. Subsequently, Torrid was used in the 1930s as a trials ship for new anti-submarine warfare weapons, particularly playing a role in the development of ASDIC. During this time, the destroyer was commanded by Charles Pizey, later the first Chief of the Naval Staff of the Indian Navy. The vessel was wrecked off the Falmouth coast en route to being broken up on 16 March 1937.

== Design and development ==
Torrid was one of ten R-class destroyers ordered by the British Admiralty in March 1916 as part of the Eighth War Construction Programme. The R class were a development of the preceding M-class, but differed in having geared turbines to improve fuel consumption, the central gun mounted on a bandstand and minor changes to improve seakeeping.

The ship was 265 feet (80.77 m) long between perpendiculars, with a beam of 26 feet 7 inches (8.10 m) and a draught of 9 feet 8 inches (2.95 m). Displacement was 975 long tons (991 t) normal and 1,035 long tons (1,052 t) deep load. Power was provided by three Yarrow boilers feeding two Brown-Curtis geared steam turbines rated at 27,000 shp (20,000 kW) and driving two shafts, to give a design speed of 36 knots (67 km/h; 41 mph). Three funnels were fitted. A total load of 296 long tons (301 t) of fuel oil was carried, giving a design range of 3,440 nautical miles (6,370 km; 3,960 mi) at 15 knots (28 km/h; 17 mph).

Armament consisted of three 4 in (100 mm) Mk IV QF guns on the ship's centreline, with one on the forecastle, one aft on a raised platform and one between the second and third funnels. A single 2-pounder (40 mm) pom-pom anti-aircraft gun was carried, while torpedo armament consisted of two twin mounts for 21 in (533 mm) torpedoes. The destroyer was fitted with racks and storage for depth charges. Initially, only two depth charges were carried but the number increased in service and by 1918, the vessel was carrying between 30 and 50 depth charges. The ship had a complement of 82 officers and ratings.

== Construction and career ==
Torrid was laid down by Swan Hunter & Wigham Richardson at Wallsend on the River Tyne on 19 July 1916 with the yard number 1025 and launched on 10 February 1917. The ship was completed on 5 May 1917. The destroyer was the first warship to carry the name in the Royal Navy, although it was derived from the name of a prize taken in 1798, Torride. On commissioning, Torrid joined the Tenth Destroyer Flotilla of the Harwich Force. Torrid remained part of the Tenth Destroyer Flotilla at the Armistice of 11 November that ended the war. As the Royal Navy returned to a peacetime level of strength and both the number of ships and the amount of personnel in service needed to be reduced to save money. The destroyer was reduced to Crew on 20 October 1919. On 26 July 1924, the vessel was briefly taken out of reserve to participate in a naval review in front of George V.

During the 1930s, Torrid was used as a trial ship for new anti-submarine weapons. The ship was equipped with ASDIC in 1930, and successfully demonstrated that the system worked. Torrid subsequently used ASDIC to successfully find the sunken aircraft-carrying submarine M2 on 3 February 1932. ASDIC went on to prove invaluable in the Battle of the Atlantic. The vessel was also used to trial a forward-firing anti-submarine mortar with less success. During this time, between 18 December 1930 and 10 July 1931, the destroyer was commanded by Charles Pizey, later the first Chief of the Naval Staff of the Indian Navy.

Torrid was considered as part of the planned Royal Navy deployment in defence of traffic between Port Said and Alexandria on 19 October 1935 after the start of the Second Italo-Ethiopian War but was retired before the outbreak of hostilities between Italy and the British Empire. The destroyer was handed over to Thos. W. Ward of Sheffield on 27 January 1937 in exchange for RMS Majestic. However, while being towed to the breakers on 16 March 1937, the ship ran aground onto rocks at Trefusis, Falmouth. The wreck was broken up and scrapped in situ, but remains of interest to divers.

The ship's plaque, bearing the motto, is held by the Imperial War Museum.

== Pennant numbers ==
Pennant number	Date
F75	1917
F80	1918
H81	1930

== Bibliography ==
- Colledge, J.J. & Warlow, Ben (2006). Ships of the Royal Navy: The Complete Record of All Fighting Ships of the Royal Navy. London: Chatham Press. ISBN 978-1-8617-6281-8.
- Dittmar, F.J. & Colledge, J.J. (1972). British Warships 1914–1919. Shepperton: Ian Allan. p. 70. ISBN 978-0-7110-0380-4.
- Franklin, George (2014). Britain's Anti-submarine Capability 1919-1939. London: Routledge. ISBN 978-1-13577-429-5.
- Friedman, Norman (2009). British Destroyers: From Earliest Days to the Second World War. Barnsley: Seaforth Publishing. ISBN 978-1-84832-049-9.
- Friedman, Norman (2012). British Destroyers & Frigates: The Second World War & After. Barnsley: Seaforth Publishing. ISBN 978-1-52670-282-1.
- Hackmann, Willem (1984). Seek & Strike: Sonar, Anti-Submarine Warfare and the Royal Navy 1914-54. London: HMSO. ISBN 978-0-11290-423-6.
- Manning, Thomas Davys & Walker, Charles Frederick (1959). British Warship Names. London: Putnam. OCLC 780274698.
- Milburn, Mark (2012). Falmouth Bay Wrecks. Falmouth: Atlantic Scuba.
- Moretz, Joseph (2002). The Royal Navy and the Capital Ship in the Interwar Period. London: Routledge. ISBN 978-0-71465-196-5.
- Parkes, Oscar & Prendegast, Maurice (1919). Jane's Fighting Ships. London: Sampson Low, Marston & Co. Ltd.
- Preston, Antony (1985). "Great Britain and Empire Forces". In Gardiner, Robert & Gray, Randal (eds.). Conway's All the World's Fighting Ships 1906–1921. London: Conway Maritime Press. pp. 1–104. ISBN 978-0-85177-245-5.
