= HMS Teazer (1917) =

Destroyer of the Royal Navy

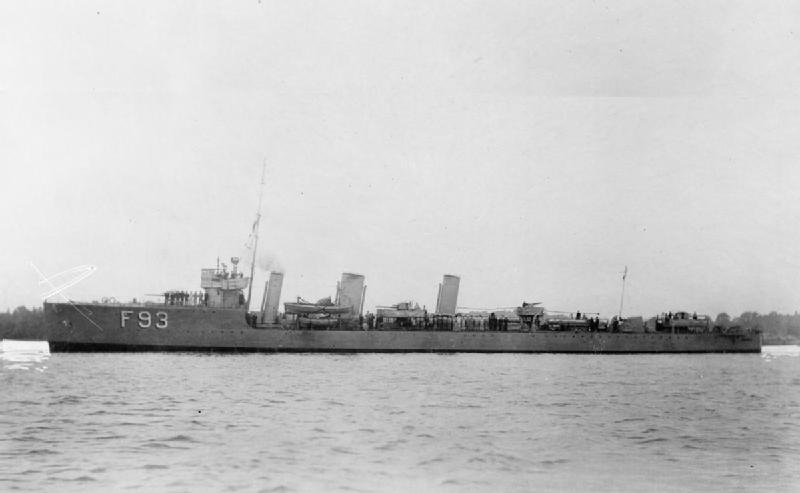
- HMS Teazer

History

United Kingdom
- Name: HMS Teazer
- Ordered: December 1915
- Builder: Thornycroft
- Laid down: March 1916
- Launched: 21 April 1917
- Commissioned: July 1917
- Out of service: 6 February 1931
- Fate: Sold to be broken up

General characteristics
- Class & type: R-class destroyer
- Displacement: 1,035 long tons (1,052 t) standard 1,208 long tons (1,227 t) full
- Length: 274 ft 3 in (83.6 m)
- Beam: 27 ft (324.0 in)
- Draught: 11 ft (3.4 m)
- Propulsion: 3 Yarrow boilers; 2 geared Brown Curtis steam turbines, 29,000 shp
- Speed: 35 knots (40 mph; 65 km/h)
- Range: 3,450 nautical miles (6,390 km) at 20 knots (37 km/h)
- Complement: 82
- Armament: 3 × QF 4 inches (102 mm) Mark IV guns, mounting P Mk. IX; 1 × single 2-pounder (40 mm) "pom-pom" Mk. II anti-aircraft gun; 4 × 21 in (533 mm) torpedo tubes (2×2)

HMS Teazer was an R-class destroyer which served with the Royal Navy during World War I. The destroyer was launched in April 1917 and, on trial, proved to be one of the fastest afloat, exceeding 40 knots (46 mph; 74 km/h). Attached to the Harwich Force, the ship supported the monitors Erebus, Terror and Marshal Soult in the bombardment of Zeebrugge in May 1918 and one of the final sorties of the war in the October following. The destroyer also took part in operations off the coast of Heligoland with a flying boat on a lighter, although the aircraft failed to take off. After the war, Teazer was kept in reserve until being sold to be broken up in 1931 following the signing of the London Naval Treaty that limited total destroyer tonnage.

== Design and development ==
Teazer was one of two R-class destroyers ordered by the British Admiralty from Thornycroft in December 1915 as part of the Seventh War Construction Programme alongside Taurus. The ships differed from the six preceding Thornycroft M-class built by the yard in having all geared turbines and the aft gun being raised on a bandstand.

The ship had an overall length of 274 feet 3 inches (83.59 m) and was 265 feet (81 m) between perpendiculars. Beam was 27 ft (324.0 in) and draught 11 ft (3.4 m). Displacement was 1,035 long tons (1,052 t) normal and 1,208 long tons (1,227 t) full load. Three Yarrow boilers fed steam to two sets of Brown-Curtis geared steam turbines rated at 29,000 shaft horsepower (22,000 kW) and driving two shafts, giving a design speed of 35 knots (65 km/h; 40 mph), although Teazer achieved a class-leading speed of 40.22 knots (74.49 km/h; 46.28 mph) during trials. Three funnels were fitted, the centre one larger in diameter than the others. A total of 296 long tons (301 t) of fuel oil was carried, giving a design range of 3,450 nautical miles (6,390 km; 3,970 mi) at 20 knots (37 km/h; 23 mph).

Armament consisted of three QF 4in Mk IV guns on the ship's centreline. One was mounted on the forecastle, one aft and one between the second and third funnels. The ship also mounted a single 2-pounder (40 mm) pom-pom anti-aircraft gun for air defence and four 21 in (533 mm) torpedoes in two twin rotating mounts. The vessel had a complement of 82 officers and ratings.

== Construction and career ==
Laid down in March 1916, the vessel was launched on 21 April 1917. Teazer was commissioned in July 1917 and joined the Harwich Force, serving as part of the Tenth Destroyer Flotilla. The name had been used by the Royal Navy for warships since 1794, most recently for a Conflict-class destroyer.

On 22 May 1918, the Dover Patrol carried out a bombardment of the German held Belgian port of Zeebrugge, using the monitors Erebus, Terror and Marshal Soult. Teazer was one of the destroyers from the Harwich Force that patrolled the outer perimeter. At the same time, the Navy was looking at alternative ways of attacking the Germans, particularly the fast but short range Thornycroft Coastal Motor Boats and Curtis Large American flying boats. A lighter was developed that could be towed by destroyers, taking the faster craft close to the enemy. On 10 August, Thisbe, towing a flying boat on a lighter and accompanied by six Coastal Motor Boats, joined a fleet of four light cruisers and thirteen destroyers to sail for Heligoland and attack German shipping. Initially, the assignment was not a success as the aircraft failed to take off and the boats were all sunk or interned, but subsequently one of the aircraft launched by one of the other destroyers shot down the Zeppelin LZ 100. The vessel also took part in one of the last operations of the war. On 1 October, Teazer was one of a five destroyers, led by flotilla leader Montrose, that identified that German forces had withdrawn from Flanders.

After the armistice of 11 November 1918 and the end of war, the destroyer remained with the Tenth Destroyer Flotilla. Recommissioned on 16 October 1919 and transferred to Devonport, the vessel was reduced to reserve on 11 August 1920. Teazer was retired following the signing of the London Naval Treaty which limited total destroyer tonnage in the Navy. The vessel was sold on 6 February 1931 to Cashmore of Newport and broken up.

== Pennant numbers ==
Pennant number	Date
F93	September 1915
F71	January 1917
D83	January 1919
F40	November 1919
H17	January 1922
