= HMS Lightfoot =

Destroyer of the Royal Navy

History

United Kingdom
- Name: HMS Lightfoot
- Builder: J. Samuel White, Cowes
- Laid down: 9 June 1914
- Launched: 28 May 1915
- Commissioned: 29 May 1915
- Fate: Sold for scrap 9 May 1921

General characteristics
- Class & type: Marksman-class flotilla leader
- Displacement: 1,440 long tons (1,460 t) normal; 1,700 long tons (1,700 t) deep load
- Length: 324 ft 10 in (99.01 m) (overall)
- Beam: 31 ft 9 in (9.68 m)
- Draught: 12 ft (3.66 m)
- Propulsion: Three shafts; Brown-Curtis steam turbines; Four Yarrow boilers; 36,000 shp (27,000 kW)
- Speed: 34 kn (63 km/h; 39 mph)
- Range: 4,290 nmi (7,950 km; 4,940 mi) at 15 knots (28 km/h; 17 mph)
- Complement: 104
- Armament: 4 × QF 4-inch (102 mm) Mark IV guns; 2 × single 2-pounder (40-mm) "pom-pom" Mk. II; 2 × twin 21-inch (533 mm) torpedo tubes

HMS Lightfoot was a Marksman-class flotilla leader (Note: Also known as the Lightfoot-class or the Kempenfelt-class.) of the British Royal Navy. Construction by J. Samuel White began in June 1914, shortly before the outbreak of the First World War, and the ship was launched and completed in 1915. She survived the war and was sold for scrap in 1921.

== Construction and design ==
The British Admiralty ordered the first two ships of the new Marksman-class flotilla leaders under the 1913–14 Construction Programme. Flotilla Leaders were large destroyer-type vessels intended to lead flotillas of smaller destroyers in action. The two ships, Lightfoot and Marksman, were intended to lead the 1st and 3rd Destroyer Flotillas, and so had names to match the L and M-class destroyers that would equip these flotillas.

The Marksman-class ships were 324 feet 10 inches (99.01 m) long overall, 324 feet (99 m) at the waterline and 315 feet 0 inches (96.01 m) between perpendiculars. They had a beam of 31 feet 9 inches (9.68 m) and a draught of 12 feet 0 inches (3.66 m). The design displacement was 1,440 long tons (1,460 t) normal and 1,700 long tons (1,700 t) full load, with a displacement of 1,607 long tons (1,633 t) stated for Lightfoot in 1919. Three sets of Brown-Curtis steam turbines were fed by four Yarrow three-drum boilers, rated at 36,000 shaft horsepower (27,000 kW), which gave a speed of 34 knots (63 km/h; 39 mph). Cruising turbines were fitted to the outer shafts. Four funnels were fitted. Up to 515 tons of oil fuel could be carried, giving a range of 4,290 nautical miles (7,950 km; 4,940 mi) at 15 knots (28 km/h; 17 mph).

The ship's main gun armament consisted of four QF 4-inch (102 mm) Mk IV guns mounted on the ships centreline, with two of the guns positioned between the ship's funnels. An anti-aircraft armament of two 1-pounder (37 mm) "pom-pom" autocannons was planned, but during construction the 1-pounder pom-poms were diverted to the British Expeditionary Force when it deployed to France at the start of the First World War, and the ship completed with two 2-pounder (40-mm) "pom-pom"s instead. Torpedo armament consisted of two twin 21-inch (533 mm) torpedo tubes. The ship's crew was 104 officers and men.

Lightfoot was laid down at J. Samuel White shipyard at Cowes on the Isle of Wight on 9 June 1914, was launched on 28 May 1915 and completed on 29 May 1915.

== Service ==
By October 1915 Lightfoot had joined the Ninth Destroyer Flotilla of the Harwich Force as second leader, replacing Tipperary. On 30 October Lightfoot sailed with the Harwich Force on a sweep across the German Bight, with a single Swedish merchant ship, the Osterland, laden with Iron Ore being arrested and ordered to the Humber for investigation. On 10 February 1915, a force of German torpedo boats carried out a sortie into the North Sea, encountering the 10th Sloop Flotilla which was carrying out minesweeping operations and sinking the sloop Arabis. The Harwich Force, including Lightfoot as well as four light cruisers and 18 destroyers sortied from Harwich at 2am on 11 February, in the belief that the battlecruisers of the German First Scouting Group were at sea. When it was realised that the German ships were returning to harbour, the Harwich Force turning back for home, but the cruiser Arethusa, flagship of Commodore Reginald Tyrwhitt, commander of the Harwich Force, struck a mine just outside Harwich harbour, killing six men. Lightfoot attempted to take Arethusa in tow, but the line parted, while similar attempts by the destroyer Loyal also failed, with the cruiser running aground and breaking in two.

On 24–26 March 1916 most of the Harwich Force, including Lightfoot, formed the escort for the seaplane carrier Vindex as Vindex carried out an air raid against a German Zeppelin base that was believed to be at Hoyer in Schleswig-Holstein. Vindex launched five seaplanes on the morning of 25 March, but only two returned at the appointed time, reporting that the Zeppelin base was at Tondern rather than Hoyer, and that they had been unable to attack it. Tyrwhitt ordered some of his destroyers, led by Lightfoot and Nimrod, to search for the overdue three aircraft. No sign of the missing seaplanes were found (they had, in fact, ditched due to engine trouble, and their crews captured by the Germans) but Lightfoot spotted two German patrol boats (Braunschweig and Otto Rudolf) which were sunk by gunfire. After the two patrol boats were sunk, Nimrod ordered the destroyers to cease firing and resume formation, but this resulted in the destroyer Laverock colliding with Medusa. While damage to Laverock was confined to her bows, Medusa had been holed in her engine room and was taken in tow by Lightfoot and set out for home at a speed of 12 knots (22 km/h; 14 mph). The weather deteriorated causing the tow line to part, and made it impossible to restore the line, so Medusa's crew were taken off by the destroyer Lassoo and Medusa left to founder. During the return journey of Tyrwhitt's force, the cruisers Cleopatra and Undaunted also collided, badly damaging Undaunted, shortly after Cleopatra rammed and sunk the German destroyer G194.

On 24 April 1916, a force of German battlecruisers and cruiser set out from Kiel to bombard the coastal towns of Lowestoft and Yarmouth. Later that day, the German battlecruiser Seydlitz struck a mine, and the resultant radio traffic warned the British of the German operation. The Harwich Force, including Lightfoot, set out to counter them on the night of 24/25 April. On the morning of 25 April the German raiding force was sighted. Heavily outnumbered, Tyrwhitt turned away in an attempt to lure the German forces away from Lowestoft, but the Germans ignored this move and shelled Lowestoft before moving North towards their next target, Yarmouth. On observing this Tyrwhitt again turned his ships in pursuit of the raiders, and engaged the light cruisers screening the German force just as the German battlecruisers started to shell Yarmouth. The German battlecruisers aborted their bombardment to engage the Harwich force, hitting the cruiser Conquest and the destroyer Laertes but retired to the East rather than attempt to destroy the smaller British force. Lightfoot was undamaged.

On 29 June 1916 the Harwich Force was cruising off the Belgian coast when Lightfoot spotted a surfaced submarine and opened fire, following this up with a depth charge when the submarine dived. No German submarine was lost or damaged on this day. On 19 August 1916, the German High Seas Fleet carried out a sortie into the North Sea, planning to bombard Sunderland. The British were warned of the German operation by radio intercepts decoded by Room 40, and sailed all available forces to meet the Germans, including the Grand Fleet under Admiral Jellicoe from Scapa Flow, the Battlecruiser force under Admiral Beatty from Rosyth and the Harwich Force, including Lightfoot. Lightfoot spotted the main German Fleet, but no engagement followed, with the Germans retiring rather than risking a battle with the Grand Fleet. The British light cruisers Nottingham and Falmouth were sunk by German submarines, while the German battleship Westfalen was torpedoed and damaged by a British submarine.

Lightfoot was deployed to the English Channel with three destroyers of the Harwich Force on 6 September 1916 as a response to German submarine activity, attacking a suspected U-boat with a depth charge off Start Point on 9 September, and remained in the Channel until 20 September. On 29 September the Harwich Force escorted Vindex as she launched a seaplane on a reconnaissance mission in support of a planned operations by British Coastal Motor Boats. The seaplane was damaged by a collision with the destroyer Landrail on landing, and Lightfoot took the damaged aircraft under tow but the aircraft sank later that day. On 28 October, as a result of the Battle of Dover Strait, a raid by German torpedo boats on the Dover Barrage and shipping in the Channel, Lightfoot was deployed with three destroyers to Dover. On 10 November the destroyer Legion was patrolling the Dover Barrage when she struck a mine. Lightfoot helped to bring the damaged destroyer back to Dover. Lightfoot was back at Harwich on 30 November, when she sailed as part of the Harwich Force in an attempt to intercept a German torpedo-boat flotilla that was sailing from Zeebrugge back to Germany.

The Ninth Destroyer Flotilla was disbanded during March 1917, with Lightfoot joining the Tenth Destroyer Flotilla, also part of the Harwich Force. On 10 May Lightfoot and four destroyers were returning from escorting a convoy to the Netherlands, while Nimrod and another division of destroyers were escorting a return convoy from the Netherlands to England, and the cruisers of the Harwich Force (Centaur, Carysfort and Conquest), together with four destroyers, were patrolling in support. The cruiser force was ENE of the North Hinder light vessel when they spotted a force of German torpedo boats that had set out from Zeebrugge to intercept the England-bound convoy. After an exchange of fire, the German torpedo boats turned back towards Zeebrugge, with the British destroyers setting off in pursuit and soon leaving the slower cruisers behind. The German force then linked up with more torpedo boats and turned back to engage the four British destroyers, before Lightfoot and her ships joined in the battle and the Germans broke off the engagement and returned home. No ships on either side were damaged, and the convoy was unscathed. On 5 June 1917, monitors of the Dover Patrol carried out a bombardment of the German occupied port of Ostend. The Harwich Force, including Lightfoot patrolled to the North East of Ostend to screen the bombarding force from attack. Early of 5 June Lightfoot spotted two German torpedo boats (S20 and S15) which were returning to base after a patrol. S20 was hit in the engine room and immobilised by a shell from a British cruiser, and was finished off by the destroyers Satyr and Torrent while S15 was badly damaged but managed to successfully make it into port.

In September 1917 Lightfoot transferred from the Harwich Force to the Sixth Destroyer Flotilla of the Dover Patrol. Lightfoot took part in the First Ostend Raid on the night of 23/24 April 1918, sailing from Dunkirk as part of the escort for the monitors supporting the assault. In April 1918 Lightfoot transferred to the 11th Destroyer Flotilla of the Grand Fleet. In July–August, she was refitted at Partick, Glasgow. On 11 November 1918, at the end of the war, Lightfoot was recorded as part of the Southern Patrol Force.

== Disposal ==
Lightfoot was laid up in reserve at Chatham by March 1919, and in February 1920 was laid up at Portsmouth with a reduced crew for care and maintenance. She was sold for scrap on 9 May 1921 to Ward of Morecambe for £2948.

== Pennant numbers ==
Pennant Number	From	To
H76	May 1915	January 1918
F58	January 1918	April 1918
G22	April 1918	September 1918
F78	September 1918	-

== Bibliography ==
- Corbett, Julian S. (1923). History of the Great War: Naval Operations: Vol. III. London: Longmans, Green and Co.
- Dittmar, F.J.; Colledge, J.J. (1972). British Warships 1914–1919. Shepperton, UK: Ian Allan. ISBN 0-7110-0380-7.
- Dorling, Taprell (1932). Endless Story: Being an account of the work of the Destroyers, Flotilla-Leaders, Torpedo-Boats and Patrol Boats in the Great War. London: Hodder and Stoughton.
- English, John (2019). Grand Fleet Destroyers: Part I: Flotilla Leaders and 'V/W' Class Destroyers. Windsor, UK: World Ship Society. ISBN 978-0-9650769-8-4.
- Friedman, Norman (2009). British Destroyers: From Earliest Days to the First World War. Barnsley, UK: Seaforth Publishing. ISBN 978-1-84832-049-9.
- Gardiner, Robert; Gray, Randal, eds. (1985). Conway's All the World's Fighting Ships 1906–1921. London: Conway Maritime Press. ISBN 0-85177-245-5.
- Jones, H. A. (1928). History of the Great War:The War in the Air: Being the Story of the Part Played in the Great War by the Royal Air Force: Vol. II. Oxford: Clarendon Press.
- Karau, Mark K. (2014). The Naval Flank of the Western Front: The German MarineKorps Flandern 1914–1918. Barnsley, UK: Seaforth Publishing. ISBN 978-1-84832-231-8.
- Manning, T. D. (1961). The British Destroyer. London: Putnam.
- Massie, Robert K. (2007). Castles of Steel. London: Vintage Books. ISBN 978-0-099-52378-9.
- Monograph No. 31: Home Waters—Part VI: From October 1915 to May 1916 (PDF). Naval Staff Monographs (Historical). Vol. XV. The Naval Staff, Training and Staff Duties Division. 1926.
- Monograph No. 32: Lowestoft Raid: 24th – 25th April, 1916 (PDF). Naval Staff Monographs (Historical). Vol. XVI. The Naval Staff, Training and Staff Duties Division. 1927.
- Monograph No. 33: Home Waters—Part VII: From June 1916 to November 1916 (PDF). Naval Staff Monographs (Historical). Vol. XVII. The Naval Staff, Training and Staff Duties Division. 1927.
- Monograph No. 35: Home Waters—Part IX: 1st May, 1917, to 31st July, 1917 (PDF). Naval Staff Monographs (Historical). Vol. XIX. The Naval Staff, Training and Staff Duties Division. 1939.
- Moore, John (1990). Jane's Fighting Ships of World War I. London: Studio. ISBN 1-85170-378-0.
- Newbolt, Henry (1928). History of the Great War: Naval Operations:Vol IV. London: Longmans, Green and Co. OCLC 220475138.
