= Mansfield (disambiguation) =

Mansfield is a town in Nottinghamshire, England. Mansfield may also refer to:

== People ==
- Mansfield (surname), including a list people with the surname
- Mansfield (given name), a list of people
- Earl of Mansfield, formerly two titles in the Peerage of Great Britain, united in 1843
- Countess of Mansfield, a title in its own right or the wife of the Earl of Mansfield

== Places ==
=== Australia ===
- Mansfield, Queensland, a suburb of Brisbane
- Mansfield, Victoria, a town
- Shire of Mansfield, a local government area in Victoria
- Shire of Mansfield (former), Victoria
- Electoral district of Mansfield, Queensland, Australia

=== Canada ===
- Mansfield, Nova Scotia, a small community
- Mansfield, Ontario, a community in Township of Mulmur
- Mansfield Township, Quebec, part of the Municipality of Mansfield-et-Pontefract

=== United Kingdom ===
- Mansfield, East Ayrshire, Scotland, a small hamlet
- Mansfield, Nottinghamshire, England, a large town
  - Mansfield District, the local council administrative area
  - Mansfield (UK Parliament constituency), largely centred around the eponymous town

=== United States ===
- Mansfield, Arkansas, a city
- Mansfield, Connecticut, a town
- Mansfield, Georgia, a city
- Mansfield, Illinois, a village
- Mansfield, Indiana, an unincorporated community
- Mansfield, Kansas, an unincorporated community
- Mansfield, Louisiana, a city
- Mansfield, Massachusetts, a town
- Mansfield, Minnesota, an unincorporated community
- Mansfield, Missouri, a city
- Mansfield, New York, a town
- Mansfield, Ohio, the second largest city in the United States named Mansfield
- Mansfield, Pennsylvania, a borough
- Mansfield, South Dakota, an unincorporated community
- Mansfield, Tennessee, an unincorporated community
- Mansfield, Texas, the largest city in the United States named Mansfield
- Mansfield, Vermont (1763–1839), a historic township annexed by Underhill, Vermont and Stowe, Vermont
- Mansfield, Washington, a town
- Mansfield, West Virginia, an unincorporated community
- Mansfield Township (disambiguation)
- Mount Mansfield, the highest mountain in Vermont

== Historic places ==
- Mansfield (Lexington, Kentucky), a house - see National Register of Historic Places listings in Fayette County, Kentucky
- Mansfield (Petersburg, Virginia), a plantation house on the National Register of Historic Places

== Schools ==
- Mansfield University of Pennsylvania
- Mansfield College (disambiguation)
- Mansfield High School (disambiguation)

== Ships ==
- HMS Mansfield, two Royal Navy destroyers
- USS Mansfield, a United States Navy destroyer which was built and served in World War II
- Mansfield, a World War I United States Navy minesweeper

== Sports ==
- Mansfield Football Club, an Australian rules football and netball club based in Mansfield, Victoria
- A.F.C. Mansfield, a football club based in Mansfield, Nottinghamshire
- Mansfield F.C., a defunct English association football club based in Mansfield, Nottinghamshire
- Mansfield Marksman, a former rugby league based in Mansfield, Nottinghamshire, for part of its existence
- Mansfield Giants, a basketball team based in Mansfield, Nottinghamshire
- Mansfield Pioneers, various minor league baseball teams (most not named Pioneers) based in Mansfield, Ohio, from 1887 to 1941

== Transportation ==
- Mansfield station (disambiguation)
- Mansfield Airport, near Mansfield, Ontario, Canada
- Mansfield Municipal Airport, near Mansfield, Massachusetts
- Mansfield railway line, Hume region of Victoria, Australia, closed in 1978

== Other uses ==
- "Mansfield", a song on the album Songs from the West Coast by Elton John
- Battle of Mansfield, an 1864 American Civil War battle
- Mansfield Correctional Institution, a state prison for men in Mansfield, Ohio
- Ohio State Reformatory, also known as the Mansfield Reformatory, a historic prison in Mansfield, Ohio

== See also ==
- Mansfield Park (disambiguation)
- Mansfeld (disambiguation)
- Manfield (disambiguation)
- Mannfield, Florida, sometimes incorrectly called Mansfield
