= HMS Mansfield =

Two ships of the British Royal Navy have been named HMS Mansfield:

- HMS Mansfield (1914), a Hawthorn M-class destroyer launched in 1914, sold for breaking up in 1921. and named for Captain Charles Mansfield who commanded HMS Minotaur at the Battle of Trafalgar.
- HMS Mansfield (G76), previously USS Evans (DD-78) launched in 1918, transferred from the US Navy in 1940 as a Town-class destroyer, decommissioned in 1944; named for towns of that name in the United Kingdom and the United States.
