= Manfield (disambiguation) =

Manfield is a village and civil parish in North Yorkshire, England.

Manfield may also refer to:

== People ==
- Alice Manfield (1878-1960), mountain guide, amateur naturalist, chalet owner, and photographer
- Ed Manfield (1943-1999), American bridge player, father to Seth
- Harry Manfield (1855-1925), British politician, M.P.
- James Mansfield (originally, Manfield, 1733-1821), British lawyer, judge, and politician
- Leslie Manfield (1915-2006), Welsh rugby player
- Matthew Manfield, Australian rules football player
- Sir Philip Manfield, shoe manufacturer and MP
- Seth Manfield (b. 1991), American Magic: the Gathering player, son of Ed

== Places ==
- Manfeild Autocourse
- Manfield Village, Connecticut
- Manfield Middle School, in Connecticut
- Manfield Timberview High School

== Other uses ==
- Manfield Non-Life Master Pairs, bridge competition
- Genro Manfield, character in The Alternate Asimovs

== See also ==
- Mansfeld (disambiguation)
- Mansfield (disambiguation)
