= USCGC Lotus =

American mine planter and buoy tender

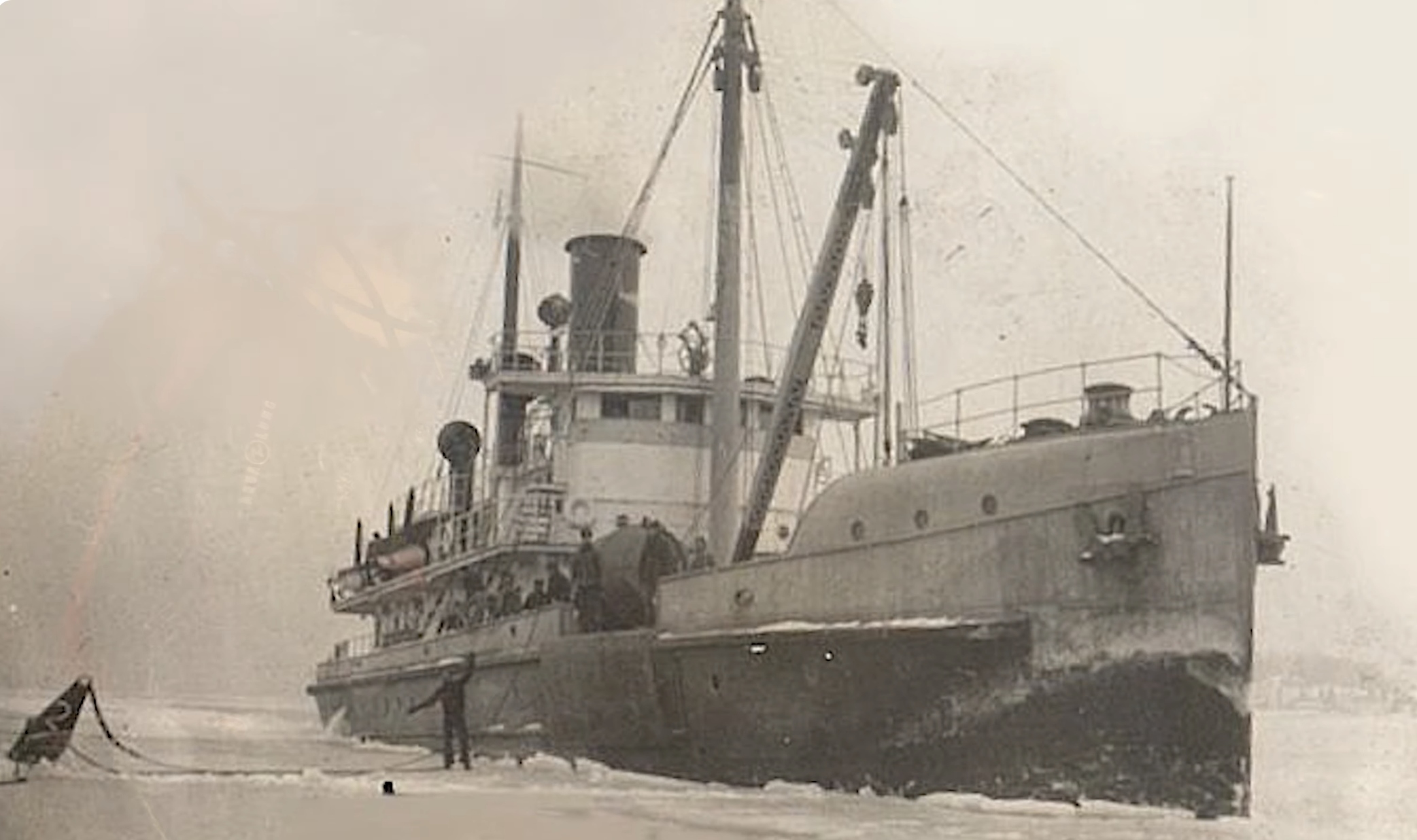
- USLHT Lotus

History

United States Army
- Name: Colonel Albert Todd
- Builder: Fabricated Ship Corporation
- Launched: 31 January 1920
- Fate: Transferred to the US Lighthouse Service, October 1921

United States Coast Guard
- Name: USLHT Lotus, 1921; USCGC Lotus, 1939
- Identification: Hull symbol: WAGL-229
- Fate: Sold 1947

General characteristics
- Displacement: 1,130 long tons (1,150 t)
- Length: 172 ft 6 in (52.58 m)
- Beam: 32 ft (9.8 m)
- Draft: 11 ft 6 in (3.51 m)
- Installed power: 2 steam engines, 1,040 horsepower
- Propulsion: 2 propellers

USAMP Colonel Albert Todd was a steel-hulled ship built for service in the U.S. Army as a mine planter. She was launched in 1920. The ship was transferred to the U.S. Lighthouse Service, and recommissioned as USLHT Lotus in 1921. When the Lighthouse Service became part of the U.S. Coast Guard in 1939, she was redesignated USCGC Lotus and was given the pennant number WAGL-229.

During most of her government career her primary mission was to maintain and supply aids to navigation including buoys, lighthouses, and lightships. During World War II, when the Coast Guard was subject to U.S. Navy orders, she also maintained antisubmarine nets at a number of ports.

Lotus was sold to private interests in 1947. The ship was never Federally documented, and her whereabouts and activities are unknown until she was reported in the Miami River in 1956. She sank at her moorings and spent years sitting on the bottom of the river. She was refloated, towed into the Atlantic, and sunk in 1971. The wreck is now a recreational diving site.

== Construction and characteristics ==
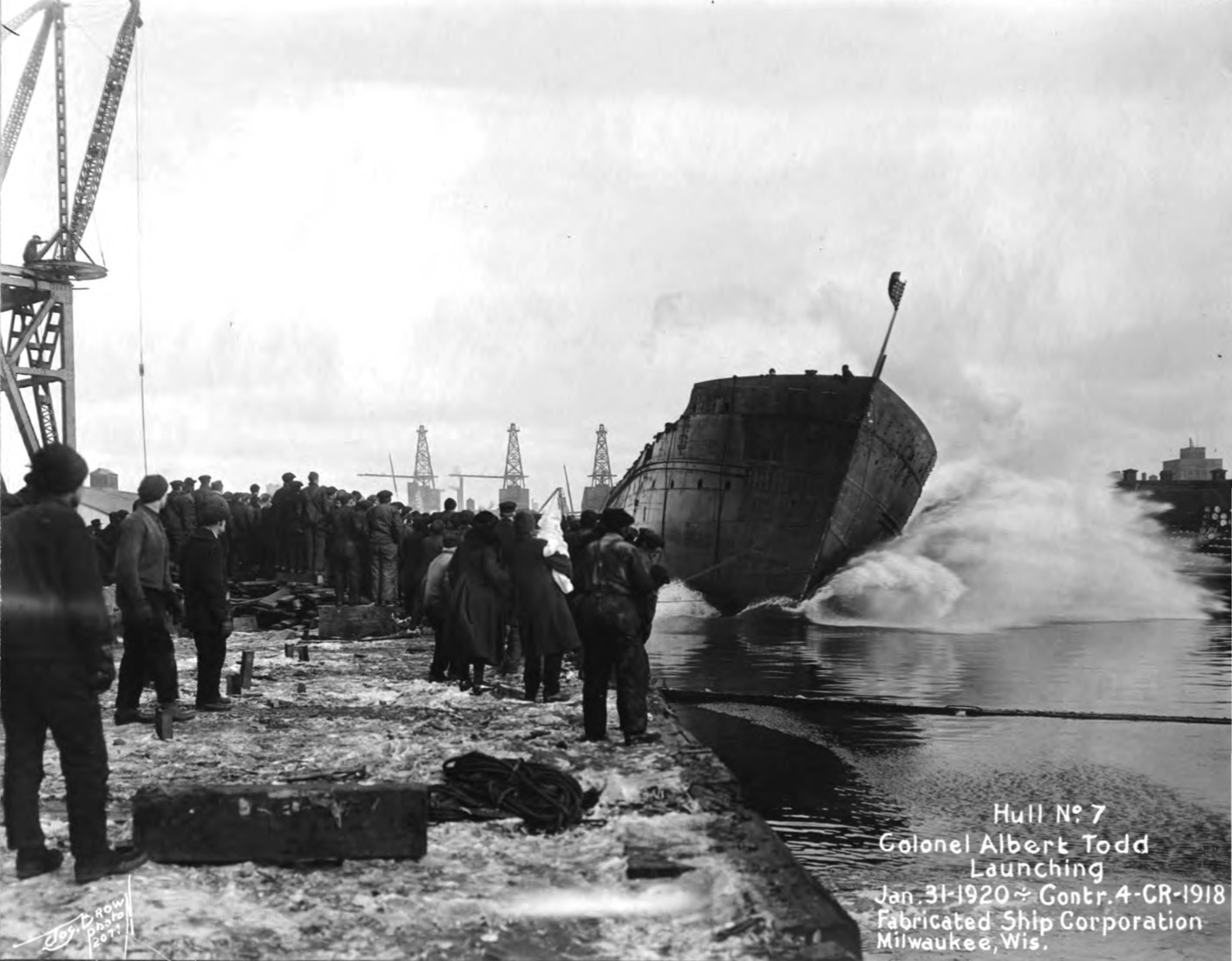
Launch of Colonel Albert Todd in 1920

In early July 1918 the Newton Engineering Company and Coddington Engineering Company, both of Milwaukee, Wisconsin, were awarded a contract for nine mine planters as joint contractors. Upon the award of the contract, Newton Engineering purchased all the assets of Coddington Engineering and changed its name to Fabricated Ship Corporation. Thus the nine ships, including Colonel Albert Todd, were built by Fabricated Ship. On the U.S. government side, the contract was executed by the US Army Quartermaster Corps, which was responsible for all Army shipbuilding, for eventual use by the Army Coast Artillery Corps.

The ship's hull and superstructure was built of steel plates riveted together. She was 172 ft 6 in (52.58 m) long overall, and 159 feet 6 inches (48.62 m) long on her waterline. She had a beam of 32 feet (9.8 m). Her light draft was 9 feet (2.7 m), and her maximum draft was 11 feet 6 inches (3.51 m). The ship's maximum displacement was 1,130 tons. Her gross register tons was 704 and her net register tons was 138.

The ship had two propellers which were driven by two Allis Chalmers compound, inverted, reciprocating steam engines. The indicated horsepower of these engines was 1,040. Steam for the engines was produced by two oil-fired boilers. Her maximum speed was 11 knots. Her fuel oil tanks had a capacity of 35,000 US gallons (130,000 L). Her unrefueld range at 10 knots was 1,800 miles.

Colonel Albert Todd was the seventh of the nine mine planters completed by Fabricated Ship. She was launched on 31 January 1920. Her original cost was $540,000.

The ship's original namesake was Colonel Albert Todd, of the US Army's Coast Artillery Corps. In 1908 he became commander of Fort Totten and the Eastern Artillery District of New York.

== Service history ==
=== US Army service (1920–1921) ===
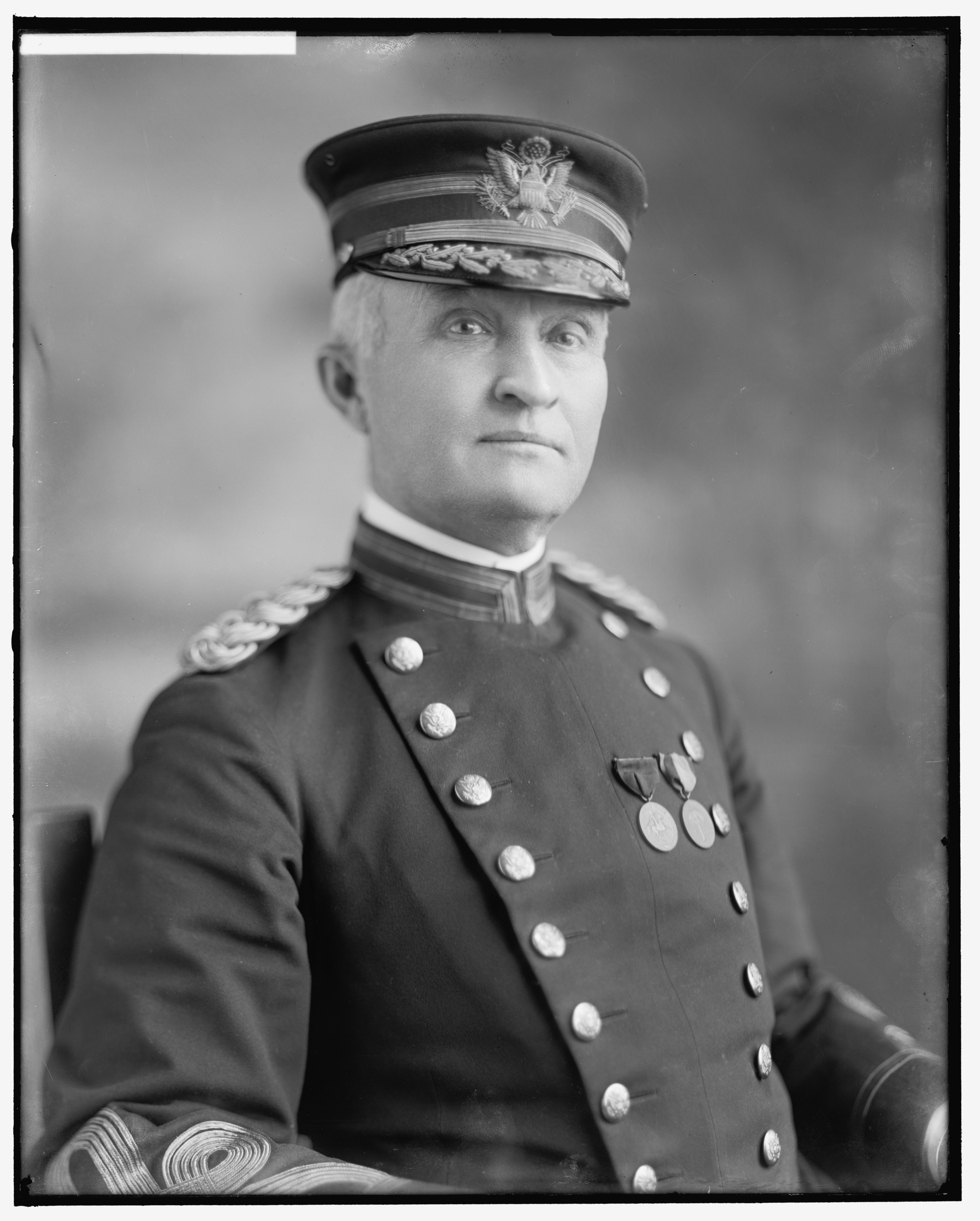
Colonel Albert Todd, the ship's original namesake

Colonel Albert Todd sailed from Milwaukee for New York on 17 October 1920. While en route, the ship was ordered to Hoboken, New Jersey to have a radio set installed. She was assigned call sign WYBI. The ship stopped at Montreal and Halifax on her way.

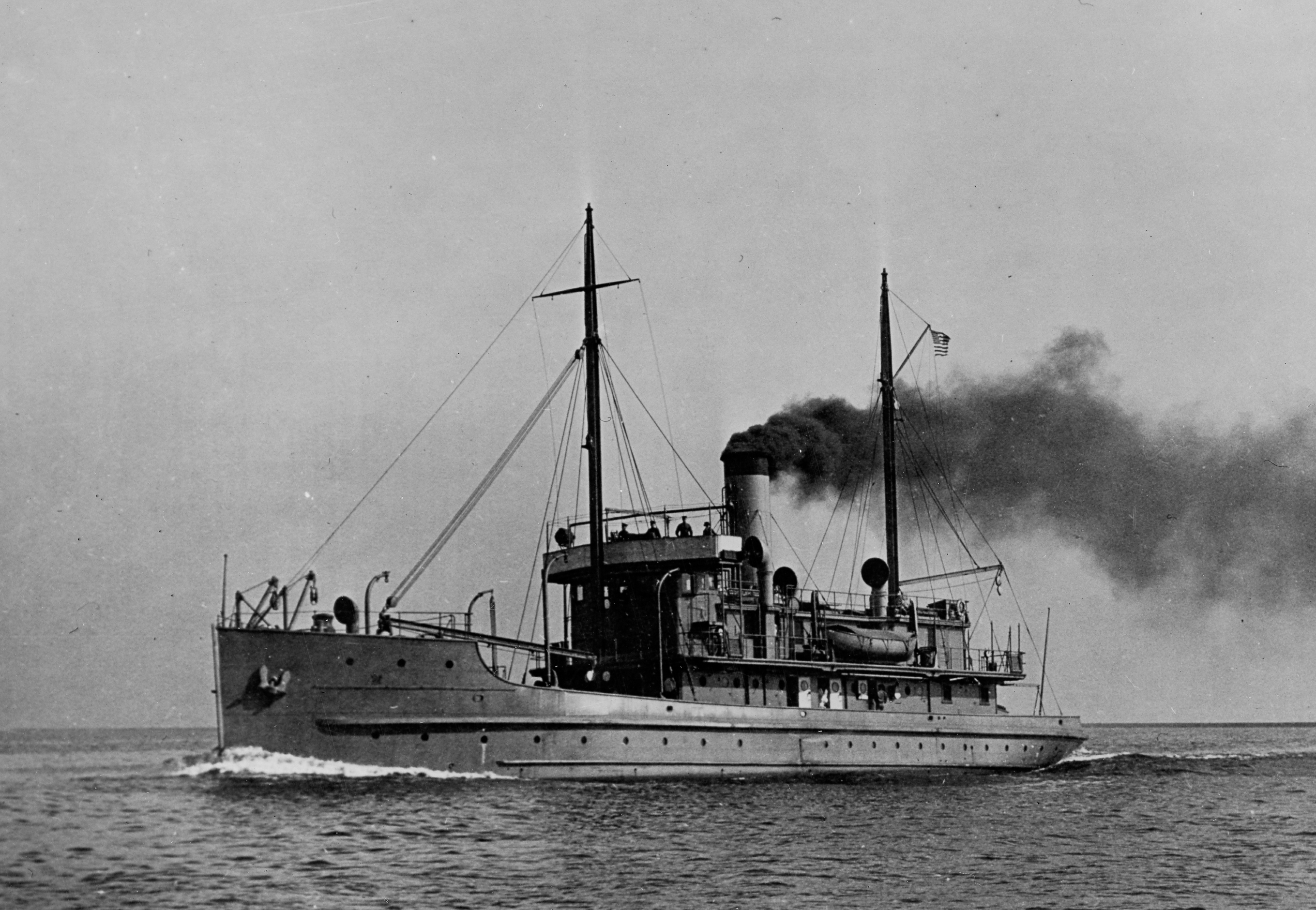
USAMP Colonel Albert Todd in 1920

Consideration was given to assigning the ship to the coastal defenses in Puget Sound, but this was ultimately rejected in favor of a series of postings in the New York area. She was assigned to Fort Wood, and later Fort Totten.

During her Army career she had a crew of seven officers and 20 men.

The Army decommissioned Colonel Albert Todd on 6 October 1921 after less than a year of service. The rapid demobilization at the end of World War I led to a global glut of ships of all types, both civilian and military. The ship's mine planting equipment was removed and stored at Fort Wood for later use.

=== US Lighthouse Service (1921–1939) ===
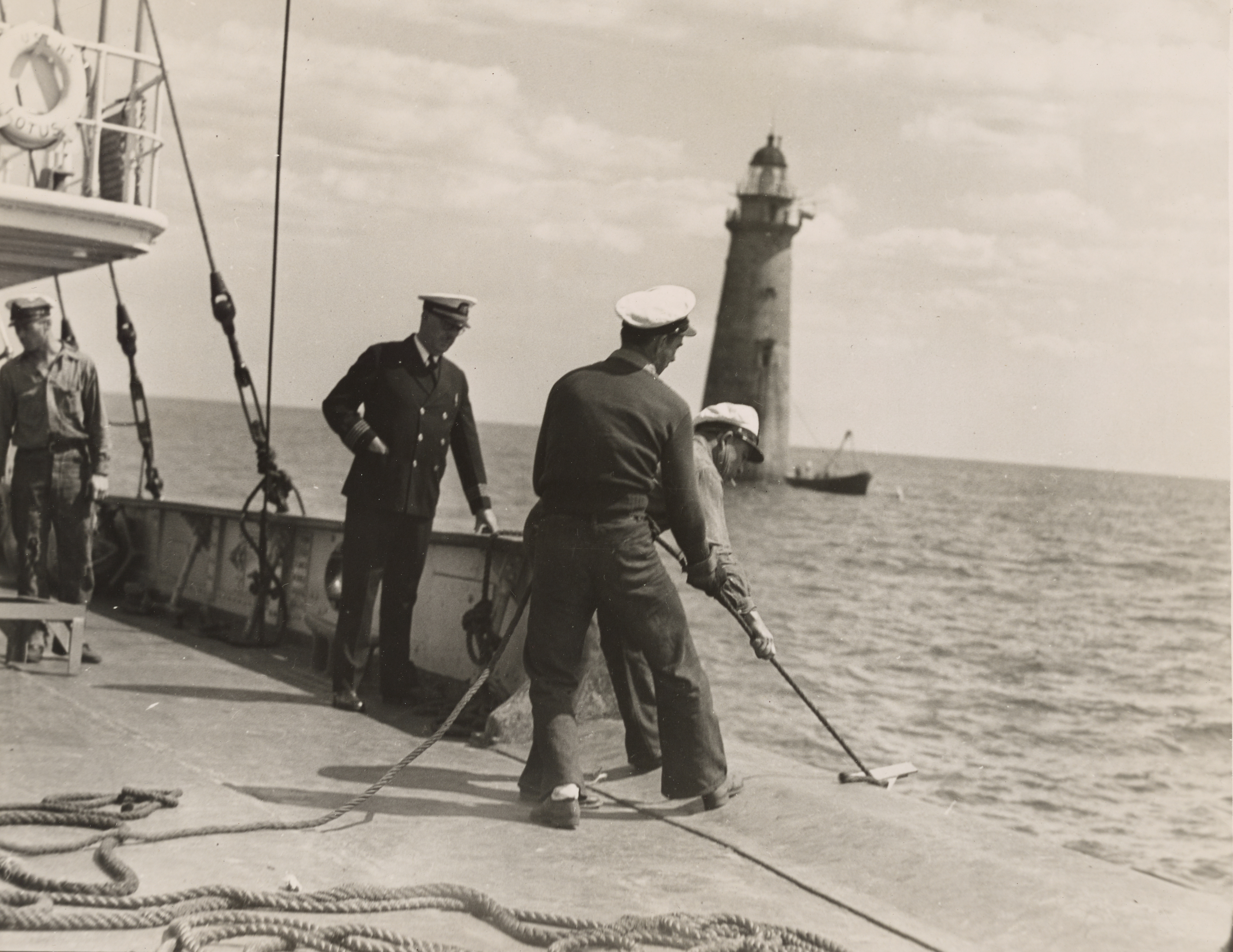
USLHT Lotus at Minot's Ledge Light. Captain George Bartlett supervising.

On 7 October 1921, the War Department gave the Lighthouse Service three of the nine mine planters built by Fabricated Ship, including Colonel Albert Todd. These and three more sisterships given to the Lighthouse Service, were designated the Speedwell class. Substantial modifications were required to convert these ships into lighthouse tenders. Colonel Albert Todd was sent to the Lighthouse Service depot on Staten Island for this work. The forecastle was rounded and the anchor raised so that they would not foul buoys the ship was maintaining. A new steel deck was placed forward to allow the ship to handle heavy buoys. A more robust forward derrick, capable of hoisting 20 tons, and related steam-powered winches were installed. A new refrigeration plant was installed, and the crew quarters were rearranged. Converting Colonel Albert Todd cost $45,710.

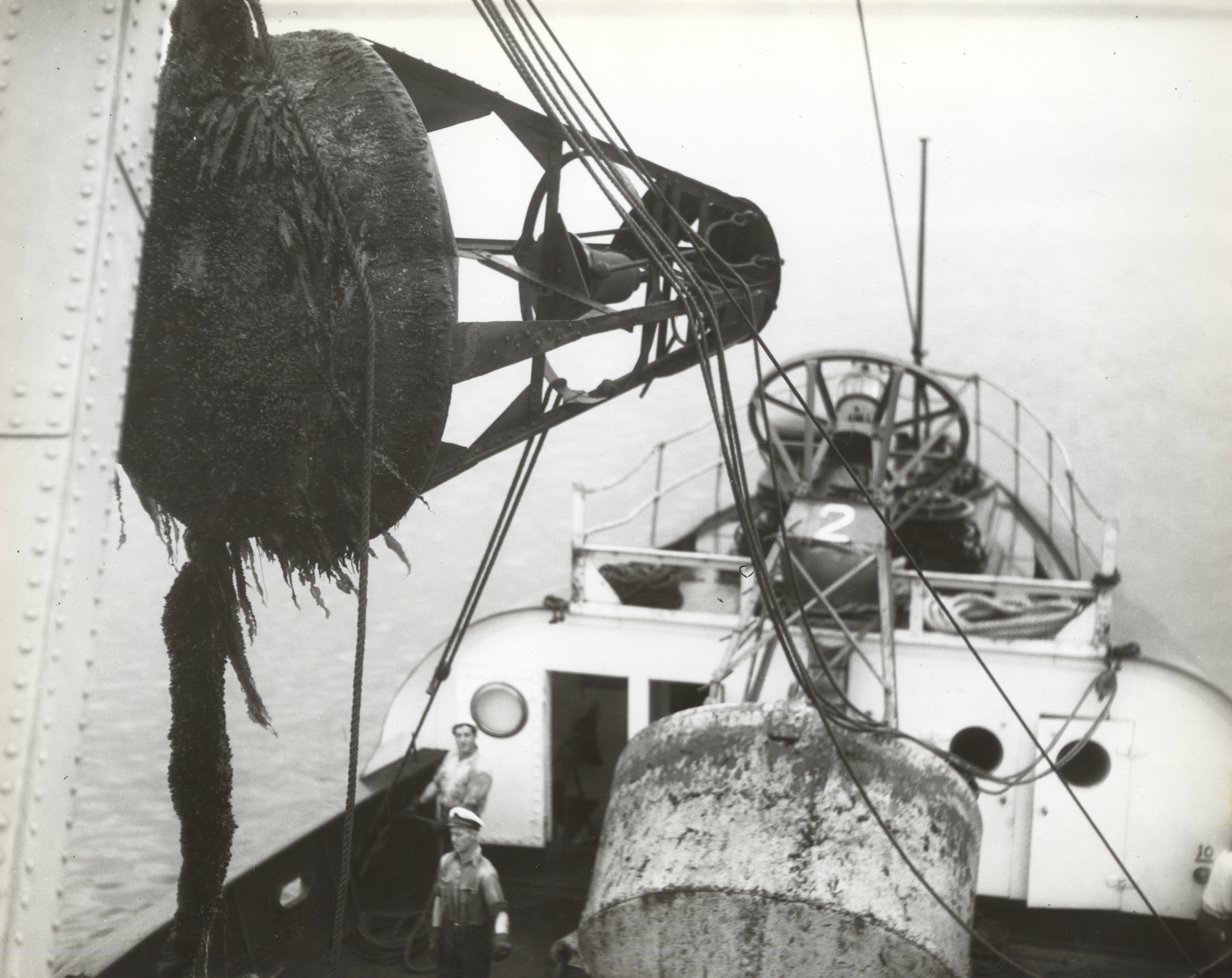
Lotus hoisting a buoy aboard in 1936

The ship was renamed USLHT Lotus. She was the third vessel of that name in the service. She was commissioned in 1924 and assigned to the 2nd Lighthouse District, with her homeport at Boston. She replaced USLHT Mayflower there. Her complement in 1924 was 6 officers and 23 men. Lotus was assigned the signal letters GVMH.

Her duties included delivering fuel, supplies, and personnel to lighthouses and lightships, towing lightships to and from port, and placing, replacing, and maintaining buoys. This last activity was made more difficult by the severe ice conditions which prevailed along the New England coast which damaged, sank, and carried away buoys. Louts' kerosene tanks held 15,000 US gallons (57,000 L) and her potable water tanks held 54,000 US gallons (200,000 L) for replenishing lighthouses and lightships.

In 1936 her radio equipment was upgraded to include a radiotelephone capability.

Her regular duties were interrupted periodically by a number of search and rescue missions. For example, on 11 August 1937, Lotus towed the disabled schooner Anna Sophia to safely at Boston. In December 1931 Lotus towed the wrecked USLHT Shrub to Staten Island for extensive repairs. In 1939 Lotus and USLHT Hibiscus played a small part in the rescue of crew members from the sunken submarine Squalus, placing mooring buoys for the rescue fleet working the scene.

=== United States Coast Guard (1939–1947) ===
The Lighthouse Service merged into the United States Coast Guard on 1 July 1939. The tender became USCGC Lotus (WAGL-229). The change in organization did not affect the ship's duties, but it did impact the men who served aboard. They went from civilians to members of a uniformed military service, which changed a host of their employment conditions. The difference became more pronounced on 1 November 1941 when President Roosevelt signed Executive Order 8929 transferring the Coast Guard from Treasury Department control to Navy department control. Lotus came under the orders of the 1st Naval District, part of the Eastern Sea Frontier, in 1941. Her homeport remained Chelsea, Massachusetts.

In July 1941 Lotus was ordered to take aboard certain buoys and other equipment and to report to the Commander-in-Chief of the Atlantic Fleet. He sent her to Argentia, Newfoundland where she set antisubmarine nets for Naval Operating Base Argentia, and buoyed both the base and the approaches to Argentia. One month later, President Franklin Roosevelt and Prime Minister Winston Churchill met aboard their ships there to produce the Atlantic Charter.

Lotus was assigned to the 10th Naval District, part of the Caribbean Sea Frontier, on 1 July 1942. Prior to sailing to her new assignment, the ship was armed at the Boston Navy Yard from 20 August to 10 September 1942. She had one 3-inch/50 caliber gun mounted on her foredeck, two 20mm/80 caliber guns, and two depth charge racks. After leaving the shipyard, she sailed down the Atlantic Coast stopping in Morehead City and Charleston, among other ports to reach her new homeport of San Juan, Puerto Rico. In July 1943 she installed antisubmarine nets at Martinique. During this period she was also sent to Kingston, Jamaica, Guantanamo Bay, Cuba, and other ports in the Caribbean.

On 6 October 1943 Lotus returned to the Eastern Sea Frontier, assigned to the 5th Naval District at Norfolk, Virginia. Here she returned to her work maintaining buoys. In February 1944, she was equipped with SO-8 surface search radar.

Her complement swelled from 3 officers and 41 men in 1942 to 3 officers, 1 warrant officer, and 55 men in 1945.

In the general demobilization at the end of World War II, the aging ships of the Speedwell class were retired. Lotus was decommissioned by the Coast Guard on 5 November 1946. All ships of the class were sold by the Coast Guard in 1947, Lotus on 11 June 1947. Her whereabouts and activities immediately after the sale are unknown.

=== Abandonment and sinking (1956–1971) ===
Lotus was purchased by David Stephen in 1956. He and his brothers ran the Stephen Brothers Shipping Line between Florida and Haiti and hoped to repair the ship for use in that trade. On 24 September 1959 Lotus began taking on water and threatened to capsize at her mooring on the Miami River, potentially blocking the shipping channel just above the Miami Avenue bridge. She sank, and sat on the river bottom. The ship was refloated in October 1959, only to sink at her mooring again further up the river in 1962. As part of a river clean-up effort, she was refloated in February 1971 and towed two miles out to sea. She was scuttled with 100 pounds of dynamite on 12 February 1971. The wreck now lies in 235 feet (72 m) of water at 25°50′54″N 80°04′39″W. She is visited by recreational divers.

== See also ==
Photographer Leslie Jones captured an image of USLHT Lotus at the Chelsea Lighthouse Service Depot on 18 May 1930 which is viewable here and a port bow perspective viewable here.

Photographer Arthur Griffin captured a view of Lotus supplying drinking water to the Boston lightship which is viewable here.
