= Mansfield Township, New Jersey =

Mansfield Township is the name of some places in the U.S. state of New Jersey:

- Mansfield Township, Burlington County, New Jersey
- Mansfield Township, Warren County, New Jersey

== See also ==
- Mansfield Township (disambiguation)
