= Mansfield station =

Mansfield station may refer to:

- Mansfield station (MBTA), in Mansfield, Massachusetts, United States
- Mansfield railway station (Nottinghamshire), in Mansfield, Nottinghamshire, England
- Mansfield railway station, Victoria, former station in Mansfield, Victoria, Australia
- Mansfield station (Louisiana) in Mansfield, Louisiana

== See also ==
- Mansfield (disambiguation)
