= HMS Mansfield (1914) =

British M-Class destroyer

History

United Kingdom
- Name: Mansfield
- Namesake: Mansfield and Mansfield
- Builder: Hawthorn Leslie, Hebburn
- Laid down: 9 July 1913
- Launched: 3 December 1914
- Completed: April 1915
- Out of service: 26 October 1921
- Fate: Sold to be broken up

General characteristics
- Class & type: Hawthorn Leslie M-class destroyer
- Displacement: 1,055 long tons (1,072 t) (normal)
- Length: 271 ft 6 in (82.75 m) (oa)
- Beam: 27 ft (8.23 m)
- Draught: 10 ft 8 1/2 in (3.26 m)
- Installed power: 4 Yarrow boilers, 27,000 shp (20,000 kW)
- Propulsion: Parsons steam turbines, 2 shafts
- Speed: 34 knots (63 km/h; 39 mph)
- Range: 2,100 nmi (3,900 km; 2,400 mi) at 15 kn (28 km/h; 17 mph)
- Complement: 78
- Armament: 3 × single QF 4-inch (102 mm) guns; 2 × single 2-pdr 40 mm (1.6 in) AA guns; 2 × twin 21 in (533 mm) torpedo tubes

HMS Mansfield was a Hawthorn Leslie M-class destroyer that served in the Royal Navy during the First World War. The M class was an improvement on those of the preceding L class, capable of higher speed. Built by the Tyneside shipbuilder Hawthorn Leslie, the destroyer was launched in 1915 and joined the Harwich Force as an anti-submarine escort for merchant ships in the Southwest Approaches and English Channel. In between that service, in 1916, Mansfield accompanied the seaplane carrier Vindex on a seaplane raid on German Zeppelin sheds during which the destroyer assisted in the sinking of two German patrol boats. In 1918, the vessel supported attacks by British monitors and submarines against Zeebrugge and escorted Vindictive to Ostend where the retired protected cruiser was sunk as a blockship. After the Armistice, Mansfield was placed in reserve before being sold to be broken up in 1921.

== Design and development ==
For the 1913–1914 shipbuilding programme for the Royal Navy, the British Admiralty, prompted by the First Lord of the Admiralty, Winston Churchill, had a need for faster destroyers than those built in previous years, in order to match reported German ships. Consequentially, they issued a set of requirements that were similar to those that had led to the previous year's L class, such as mounting four torpedo tubes, except for a higher speed of 36 knots (41 mph; 67 km/h). The Admiralty first ordered two builder's specials each from the experienced destroyer builders Yarrow, Thonycroft and Hawthorn Leslie, to the builder's own designs in March 1913, with another ship ordered to Yarrow's design in May, and then ordered six to the standard Admiralty design, all with names beginning with M.

Hawthorn Leslie's design was 271 feet 6 inches (82.75 m) long overall and 265 feet (81 m) between perpendiculars, with a beam of 27 feet (8.23 m) and a draught of 10 feet 8 1/2 inches (3.26 m). Displacement was 1,055 long tons (1,072 t) normal and 1,198 long tons (1,217 t) deep load. Power was provided by four Yarrow water-tube boilers feeding steam to Parsons steam turbines that drove two shafts. The machinery was rated at 27,000 shaft horsepower (20,000 kW), giving a speed of 34 knots (39 mph; 63 km/h). Design range was 2,100 nautical miles (3,900 km; 2,400 mi) at 15 knots (28 km/h; 17 mph). Peacetime fuel oil tankage was 290 long tons (290 t). In wartime, 145 long tons (147 t) of fuel oil was carried to give an endurance of 1,650 nautical miles (3,060 km; 1,900 mi) at 15 knots (28 km/h; 17 mph). The uptakes from the boilers were routed to individual funnels, giving a total of four funnels.

Mansfield had a main armament consisting of three single QF 4-inch (102 mm) Mk IV guns on the centreline, with one on the forecastle, one aft on a raised platform and one between the middle funnels. Torpedo armament consisted of two twin torpedo tubes for 21 in (533 mm) torpedoes located aft of the funnels. For anti-aircraft defence, two single 2-pdr 40 mm (1.6 in) "pom-pom" guns were carried on a platform between the torpedo tubes. The destroyer was later fitted with paravanes and depth charges for anti-submarine warfare. The ship had a complement of 78 officers and ratings.

== Construction and career ==
Mansfield was laid down by Hawthorn Leslie at their yard in Hebburn with yard number 469 on 9 July 1913, launched on 3 December the following year and was completed four months later in April 1915. The destroyer, costing £125,882, was the second of two Hawthorn Leslie M-class destroyers, after Mentor and the first ship to enter Royal Navy service to be named after both the town of Mansfield and Charles Mansfield, commander of ship of the line Minotaur at the Battle of Trafalgar.

Launched soon after the start of the First World War, Mansfield was deployed as part of the Harwich Force, joining the Tenth Destroyer Flotilla. The warship was deployed to Milford Haven on anti-submarine duties to protect merchant ships sailing in the Southwest Approaches, arriving on 14 June. The vessel spent the following months escorting ships arriving and departing from Avonmouth and Devonport to cross the Atlantic to Canada and troopships leaving Liverpool for the Dardanelles. On 4 August, the destroyer participated in a search for German warships near Terschelling and another across the German Bight on 31 October.

On 26 and 27 February 1916, the flotilla took part in a large naval exercise east of Shetland, involving four flotillas of destroyers, as well as all the operational battlecruisers, battleships and cruisers of the Grand Fleet. The exercise was deemed a success. Between 24 and 26 March most of the Harwich Force, including Mansfield, formed an escort for the seaplane carrier Vindex as Vindex transported aircraft to be used in a raid against the German Zeppelin base that was believed to be at Hoyer in Schleswig-Holstein. Vindex launched five seaplanes on 25 March, but only two returned at the appointed time, reporting that the Zeppelin base was at Tondern rather than Hoyer, and that they had not been able to attack it. Mansfield spotted two German patrol boats, Braunschweig and Otto Rudolf, and opened fire. Other destroyers then contributed to a barrage of shells that sank both boats. During the return journey, the cruisers Cleopatra and Undaunted collided, badly damaging Undaunted, shortly after Cleopatra rammed and sank the German destroyer G194. Mansfield was unharmed.

On 23 January 1917, the destroyer was patrolling near Schouwen at night when a flotilla of German destroyers was spotted. Poor visibility meant Mansfield saw no action. The destroyer resumed escort duties, this time across the English Channel, as the threat from German submarines became even more intense. On 23 April 1918, the destroyer was part of the escort for the monitors HMS General Craufurd, Lord Clive, Marshal Soult and Prince Eugene for their attack on Zeebrugge. The destroyer, along with Talisman-class destroyer Trident, also towed the C-class submarines C1 and C3 into action. The submarines destroyed a viaduct. The destroyer then escorted the retired protected cruiser Vindictive to Ostend, where the older vessel was sunk to act as a blockship.

After the Armistice that ended the war, the Royal Navy returned to a peacetime level of strength and both the number of ships and personnel needed to be reduced to save money. The destroyer was transferred to reserve at the Nore. However, the harsh conditions of wartime operations, particularly the combination of high speed and the poor weather that is typical of the North Sea, exacerbated by the fact that the hull was not galvanised, meant that the ship was soon worn out. Mansfield was declared superfluous to operational requirements, retired, and, on 26 October 1921, was sold to Barking Ship Breaking Co, and broken up.

== Pennant numbers ==
Pennant number	Date
H1A	August 1915
H70	January 1918
G87	January 1919
D37	September 1918
