= Mansveld =

Mansveld may refer to:

- Aad Mansveld (1944–1991), Dutch football player
- Debby Mansveld, Dutch cyclist; see 2006 UCI Women's Road World Rankings
- Freddy Mansveld (20th century), Belgian bobsledder
- Wilma Mansveld (born 1962), Dutch politician

== See also ==
- Mansfeld (disambiguation)
