= Mansfield (given name) =

Mansfield is a masculine given name which may refer to:

- Mansfield Lovell (1822–1884), Confederate major general during the American Civil War
- Mansfield Markham (1905–1971), British film producer and director
- Mansfield Merriman (1848–1925), American civil engineer and professor
- Mansfield Owen (1852–1940), English Anglican priest, Archdeacon of Aston, Archdeacon of Birmingham and Dean of Ripon
- Mansfield Parkyns (1823–1894), English traveller and travel book writer
- Mansfield Rangi (1935–1987), New Zealand cricket umpire
- Mansfield Smith-Cumming (1859–1923), British Royal Navy captain and first chief of the Secret Intelligence Service
- Mansfield Wrotto (born 1984), Liberian former National Football League player
