= Mansfeld (disambiguation) =

Mansfeld is a town in Saxony-Anhalt, Germany.

Mansfeld may also refer to:

- 79138 Mansfeld, a minor planet
- Colloredo-Mansfeld, a German Princely family based in Austria
- House of Mansfeld, a princely German house that took its name from the town of Mansfeld in present-day Saxony-Anhalt
- Mansfeld Castle, a castle in Saxony-Anhalt, Germany
- Mansfeld Land, a region of Saxony-Anhalt, Germany
- Mansfeld-Südharz, a district in Saxony-Anhalt, Germany
- Palais Mansfeld or La Fontaine Castle, a former castle in Clausen, Luxembourg

== People ==
- Dorothea of Mansfeld (1493–1578), German noblewoman and healer
- Miroslav J. Mansfeld (1912–1991), a Czech World War II flying ace
- Agnes von Mansfeld-Eisleben (1551–1637), Countess of Mansfeld
- Ernst von Mansfeld (c. 1580–1626), general of the Thirty Years' War
- Gebhard I von Mansfeld-Vorderort (c. 1525–1562), Archbishop and Prince-Elector of Cologne
- Karl von Mansfeld (1543–1595), German general during the Cologne War and the Ottoman-Habsburg wars
- Peter Ernst I von Mansfeld-Vorderort (1517–1604), Governor of the Spanish Netherlands
- Philipp von Mansfeld (1589–1657), troop commander during the Thirty Years' War
- Hieronymus Karl Graf von Colloredo-Mansfeld (1775–1822), Austrian corps commander during the Napoleonic Wars

== See also ==
- Mansfelder Land (disambiguation)
- Mansfeldt Findlay (1861–1932), British diplomat
- Mansfield (disambiguation)
- Mansveld (disambiguation)
