= Countess of Mansfield =

Countess of Mansfield is a title that may be held by a woman in her own right or by the wife of the Earl of Mansfield. Women who have held the title include:

- Louisa Murray, 2nd Countess of Mansfield (1758–1843), holds the title in her own right
- Frederica Murray, Countess of Mansfield (1774-1837), holds the title by marriage
