= Hawthorn M-class destroyer =

Historical class of ships in British Navy

Class overview
- Builders: Hawthorn Leslie and Company, Hebburn
- Operators: Royal Navy
- Built: 1914–1915
- In commission: 1915–1921
- Completed: 2
- Retired: 2

General characteristics
- Type: Destroyer
- Displacement: 1,057 long tons (1,074 t)
- Length: 271 ft 6 in (82.75 m) o/a
- Beam: 27 ft 6 in (8.38 m)
- Draught: 10 ft 6 in (3.20 m)
- Depth: 16 ft 9 in (5.11 m)
- Propulsion: Yarrow-type boilers, Parsons I.R. steam turbines, 3 shafts, 27,000 hp (20,134 kW), 300 tons oil fuel
- Speed: 35 knots (40 mph; 65 km/h)
- Complement: 76
- Armament: 3 × QF 4 in (102 mm) Mark IV guns, mounting P Mk.IX; 1 × single QF 2-pounder "pom-pom" Mk.II; 2 × twin 21 inch (533 mm) torpedo tubes

The Hawthorn M (or Mansfield) Class were a class of two destroyers built for the Royal Navy under the pre-war 1913-14 Programme for World War I service.

They were similar to the Admiralty M class, but completed to a modified design by Hawthorn Leslie and Company, Hebburn on Tyne. They had four funnels instead of the three funnels of the Admiralty design; as a consequence, they were the last four-funnelled destroyers (apart from Leaders) to be built for the Royal Navy. The midships 4 inch gun was shipped between the second and third funnels. Both ships were laid down on 9 July 1914 and completed in 1915. Both survived the war and were scrapped in 1921,

Hawthorn Leslie subsequently received orders for two further M class destroyers as part of the large batch of orders placed in May 1915, but these two - Pidgeon and Plover - were built to the Admiralty M class design.

== Ships ==
- Mentor, launched 21 August 1914, completed January 1915, sold for breaking up 9 May 1921 to Thos. W. Ward at Hayle.
- Mansfield, launched 3 December 1914, completed April 1915, sold for breaking up 26 October 1921 to Barking Ship Breaking Company.

== Bibliography ==
- Destroyers of the Royal Navy, 1893-1981, Maurice Cocker, 1983, Ian Allan ISBN 0-7110-1075-7
- Jane's Fighting Ships, 1919, Jane's Publishing
