= Mansfield High School =

Mansfield High School can refer to:

- Mansfield State High School, Mansfield, Australia
- Mansfield High School (Lancashire, England)
- Mansfield High School (Mansfield, Arkansas)
- Mansfield High School (Mansfield, Massachusetts)
- Mansfield High School (Mansfield, Pennsylvania)
- Mansfield High School (Mansfield, Texas)
- Mansfield Legacy High School, Mansfield, Texas
- Mansfield Senior High School, Mansfield, Ohio
