= HMS Mentor (1914) =

Destroyer of the Royal Navy

History

United Kingdom
- Name: HMS Mentor
- Builder: Hawthorn Leslie, Hebburn
- Laid down: 9 July 1913
- Launched: 21 August 1914
- Completed: January 1915
- Fate: Sold May 1921

General characteristics
- Class & type: Hawthorn Leslie M-class destroyer
- Displacement: 1,198 long tons (1,217 t) deep load
- Length: 271 ft 6 in (82.75 m) oa
- Beam: 27 ft (8.23 m)
- Draught: 10 ft 8 1/2 in (3.26 m)
- Installed power: 27,000 shp (20,000 kW)
- Propulsion: 4× Yarrow boilers; Parsons steam turbines; 2 shafts
- Speed: 35 kn (40 mph; 65 km/h)
- Complement: 76
- Armament: 3 × 4-inch (102 mm) guns; 1 × 2-pounder (40 mm) guns; 4 × 21 inch (533 mm) torpedo tubes

HMS Mentor was a Hawthorn Leslie M-class destroyer of the British Royal Navy. Built by the Tyneside shipbuilder Hawthorn Leslie between 1913 and 1915, Mentor served during the First World War. She formed part of the Harwich Force in the early years of the war, taking part in the Battle of Dogger Bank and then later in the English Channel as part of the Dover Patrol. She survived the war, and was sold for scrap in 1921.

== Design and construction ==
For the 1913–1914 shipbuilding programme for the Royal Navy, the British Admiralty, prompted by the First Lord of the Admiralty, Winston Churchill, had a requirement for faster destroyers than those built in previous years, in order to match reported German ships. They hoped for a speed of 36 knots (41 mph; 67 km/h), but otherwise, the requirements were similar to those that gave rise to the previous year's L-class. The Admiralty first ordered two builder's specials each from the experienced destroyer builders Yarrow, Thonycroft and Hawthorn Leslie, to the builder's own designs, with another ship ordered to Yarrow's design in May 1913, and then ordered six to the standard Admiralty design.

Hawthorn Leslie's design was 271 feet 6 inches (82.75 m) long overall and 265 feet 0 inches (80.77 m) between perpendiculars, with a beam of 27 feet 0 inches (8.23 m) and a draught of 10 feet 8 1/2 inches (3.264 m). Displacement was 1,098 long tons (1,116 t) normal and 1,198 long tons (1,217 t) deep load. Four Yarrow water-tube boilers fed steam to Parsons steam turbines, which drove two propeller shafts. The machinery was rated at 27,000 shaft horsepower (20,000 kW), giving a speed of 34 knots (39 mph; 63 km/h). The uptakes from the boilers were routed to individual funnels, giving a total of four funnels.

The ships were armed with three 4-inch (102 mm) QF Mk 4 guns, together with two 2-pounder pom-pom anti-aircraft autocannons. (Note: It was originally planned to fit 1-pounder pom-poms, but when built the ships were fitted with 1 1/2-pounder (37-mm) pom-poms which were later replaced by 2-pounder (40-mm) guns.) Two twin 21-inch (533mm torpedo tubes were fitted.

Mentor, the first of the Hawthorn Leslie specials, was laid down on 9 July 1913, was launched on 21 August 1914 and completed in January 1915.

== Service ==
=== Harwich Force ===
Mentor joined the Harwich Force on completion, which operated in the North Sea and could reinforce the Grand Fleet or forces in the English Channel as required.

On 23 January 1915, the German battlecruisers under Admiral Franz von Hipper made a sortie to attack British fishing boats on the Dogger Bank. British Naval Intelligence was warned of the raid by radio messages decoded by Room 40, and sent out the Battlecruiser Force from Rosyth, commanded by Admiral Beatty aboard Lion and the Harwich Force, commanded by Commodore Reginald Tyrwhitt aboard the light cruiser Arethusa were sent out to intercept the German force. The recently commissioned Mentor was one of seven M-class destroyers of the 10th Destroyer Flotilla sailing with the Harwich Force. The British and German Forces met on the morning of 24 January in the Battle of Dogger Bank. On sighting the British, Hipper ordered his ships to head south-east to escape the British, who set off in pursuit. Being the fastest destroyers available to the British, the seven M-class were sent ahead to report the strength of the German forces. Although briefly forced to turn away by fire from the armoured cruiser Blücher, they managed to successfully report the German's strength and course before being ordered to pull back and take up station ahead of the British line as Beatty's battlecruisers came into gun range of the German ships. At about 09:20, German destroyers appeared to be preparing a torpedo attack, and the British destroyers were ordered ahead of the line in order to prevent such an attack. Only the M-class destroyers had sufficient speed to respond and slowly draw ahead of the British battlecruisers, but no attack by German destroyers followed. Later, at about 11:00, an emergency turn to avoid a non-existent German submarine and misinterpretation of signals from Lion caused the British battlecruisers to concentrate on Blücher, already badly damaged and trailing well behind the other German ships, and allowing the rest of Hipper's fleet to escape. Mentor took part with three other destroyers in a torpedo attack against Blücher, with Mentor firing three torpedoes. Blücher was eventually overwhelmed by British shells and torpedoes, sinking at 12:10.

On 23 March 1915 ships of the Harwich Force escorted the seaplane carrier Empress on an attempted raid against a German radio station at Norddeich. The force ran into thick fog just as the seaplanes were due to be launched, causing the operation to be abandoned, and the destroyer Landrail collided with the light cruiser Undaunted. Landrail was badly damaged, with her bow smashed, and Mentor helped to tow the stricken destroyer stern-first back to Harwich. On 28 March 1915, four destroyers of the Harwich force (Laurel, Liberty, Leonidas and Lucifer) carried out an anti-submarine sweep off the Dutch coast. When a submarine was sighted, six more destroyers of the Harwich Force, including Mentor, were sent to reinforce the patrol, but shortly after the two groups of destroyers met up, the force was recalled as radio intercepts indicated that German battlecruisers were about to sortie.

On 13 June 1915, the 10th Destroyer Flotilla was ordered to Avonmouth for operations in the South-West Approaches, and in particular, to escort troopships carrying the 13th Division to the Middle East on the initial part of their journey, with two destroyers per transport. After the 13th Division had all left, the 10th Flotilla continued on escort duties based at Devonport, escorting the ships carrying the next division to be sent to the Gallipoli campaign, the 12th Division. On 2 July 1915, Mentor, together with Manly and Miranda escorted the former ocean liner Empress of Britain, on passage from Liverpool to the Dardanelles on the first part of her journey and carrying 4500 troops. Mentor and Miranda left Empress of Britain at about 5:00pm that evening so they could turn back and pick up Aquitania, another Dardanelles-bound former ocean liner, carrying 5939 tropps which set out from Liverpool on 3 July. The two destroyers left Aquitania on the morning of 4 July, west of the Scilly Isles, and set course for Plymouth, but 30 minutes after they broke off from the liner, the German submarine U-39 missed Aquitania with a torpedo. Later that morning, Mentor and Miranda picked up an SOS call from the transport Anglo-Californian, carrying a load of 927 horses from Canada to Britain. Anglo-Californian was being chased and fired on by U-39. The transport received heavy damage from U-39's guns, with her Captain (Frederick Daniel Parslow, who was posthumously awarded the Victoria Cross for the action) and 20 of her crew being killed, but the arrival of Mentor and Miranda drove off U-39, allowing the transport to be brought into Queenstown.

On 4–5 August 1915, Mentor took part in a sweep of four light cruisers and four destroyers of the Harwich Force against German torpedo-boats and trawlers that were believed to be patrolling off Terschelling. The force encountered no German surface forces, although a submarine, which quickly dived away, was sighted near the North Hinder light vessel. On 16 August 1915, two divisions of the 10th Flotilla, 8 destroyers in total, with Mentor leading one of the divisions, escorted the minelayer Princess Margaret which was tasked with laying a minefield on the Arum Bank. On the afternoon of16 August, the force encountered groups of neutral and German trawlers., and detected suspicious radio signals which appeared to come from the vicinity. One German trawler was sunk by the destroyer Miranda while Medusa was detached from the group to search another trawler, but the source of the signals was not identified. The operation continued, despite the knowledge from radio intercepts that a force of German destroyers (II Torpedo-Boat Flotilla) was at sea. At about 8:45 pm five patrolling German destroyers encountered the British force near the Horns Reefs light vessel. Mentor, on spotting the German ships, steered to get between the German ships and Princess Margaret but was almost immediately struck in the bow by a German torpedo fired from the destroyer B98. Princess Margaret turned away to avoid the attack, with the rest of the British destroyers (most of which had not spotted the German ships and thought that Mentor had struck a mine) following. The German force also turned away, and Mentor, which had her bow blown off, was left by herself to make her way back to base. Despite the damage, Mentor made it safely back to Harwich.

On 25 December 1915, Mentor was one of eight destroyers from the Harwich Force that were ordered with the leader Nimrod to the Channel as a result of attacks by the German submarine U-24.

On the night of 31 March/1 April 1916 Mentor was ordered to lead a division off destroyers to patrol off Cromer while Murray led another division off Lowestoft to defend against attacks by German airships. The destroyers saw nothing, although one airship L15 was shot down over the Thames by ground defences. On 25 April 1916 German battlecruisers bombarded Lowestoft. Mentor sailed with the Harwich force in its attempt to engage the German battlecruisers. On the night of 23/24 July 1916, eight destroyers and two light cruiser of the Harwich force set out on a patrol to protect shipping passing between Britain and the Netherlands from German attack, with the force being divided into two divisions, with Meteor forming part of the 1st Division, led by the cruiser Carysfort. The division sighted three German destroyers and set off in pursuit, but the German force escaped under cover of a rain squall and a heavy smoke screen. The second division, led by the cruiser Canterbury, also encountered the three German destroyers, but the German force managed to reach Zeebrugge safely.

=== Dover Patrol ===
On 18 February 1917, Mentor joined the Dover Patrol. On the night of 17/18 March 1917, German torpedo boats launched an attack on the Dover Barrage, sinking the destroyer Paragon and torpedoing and damaging Llewellyn, while other torpedo boats attacked at the north entrance to the Downs, sinking one merchant ship and shelling Ramsgate. Mentor was one of a force of one light cruiser, one destroyer leader and four destroyers on patrol near Deal. They set off after the German torpedo boats, but were too late, and the Germans escaped unharmed. German torpedo boats attacked the Dover Barrage again on the night of 20/21 April 1917. Mentor was one of six destroyers held in reserve at Dover, while four destroyers (Nugent, Matchless, Morris and Amazon) patrolled on the south side of the Dover straits and two destroyers (Broke and Swift on the north side. Swift and Botha encountered six German torpedo boats, with Swift torpedoing G85 and Botha ramming and sinking G42. Botha was badly damaged, losing steam, but continued to engage G85. Mentor, together with Lydiard and Lucifer went to the assistance of Botha, helping to pull her away from the burning wreck of G85, which eventually sank, and stayed with Botha until tugs came to take the damaged destroyer back to Dover.

On 5 June 1917, Mentor was part of the escort for the monitors Erebus and Terror when the bombarded the German-held port of Ostend. The bombardment sank the submarine UC-70 and badly damaged the torpedo boat G41. On 27 October Mentor, together with Botha and the French destroyers Capitaine Mehl and Magon had a brief encounter with three German destroyers.

On 22 April 1918, the British launched attacks against Zeebrugge and Ostend, with the intention of blocking the entrances to the canals linking these ports with Bruges. Mentor took part on the raid on Ostend, forming part of the escort for the Monitors supporting the attack.

== Disposal ==
By the end of the war the M-class destroyers were worn-out, and by May 1919, Mentor was in reserve at Devonport. Mentor was sold on 9 May 1921 to Ward for scrapping at their Milford Haven ship breaking yard.

== Pennant numbers ==
Pennant number	Dates
H6A	1914–January 1918
H77	January 1918–September 1918
D54	September 1918 –

== Bibliography ==
- Bacon, Reginald (1919). The Dover Patrol 1915–1917: Vol. II. London: Hutchinson & Co.
- Corbett, Julian S. (1921). Naval Operations: Vol II. History of the Great War. London: Longmans, Green and Co.
- Corbett, Julian S. (1923). Naval Operations: Volume III. History of the Great War. London: Longmans, Green and Co.
- Dittmar, F. J.; Colledge, J. J. (1972). British Warships 1914–1919. Shepperton, UK: Ian Allan. ISBN 0-7110-0380-7.
- Dorling, Taprell (1932). Endless Story: Being an Account of the Work of the Destroyers, Flotilla Leaders, Torpedo-Boats and Patrol Boats in the Great War. London: Hodder and Stoughton.
- Friedman, Norman (2009). British Destroyers: From Earliest Days to the Second World War. Barnsley, UK: Seaforth. ISBN 978-1-84832-049-9.
- Gardiner, Robert; Gray, Randal, eds. (1985). Conway's All the World's Fighting Ships 1906–1921. London: Conway Maritime Press. ISBN 0-85177-245-5.
- Hurd, Archibald (1924). The Merchant Navy. History of the Great War. Vol. II. London: John Murray.
- Karau, Mark (2014). The Naval Flank of the Western Front: The German MarineKorps Flandern 1914–1918. Barnsley, UK: Seaforth. ISBN 978-1-84832-231-8.
- Massie, Robert K. (2007). Castles of Steel: Britain, Germany and the Winning of the War at Sea. London: Vintage Books. ISBN 978-0-099-52378-9.
- Monograph No. 12: The Action of Dogger Bank, January 24th, 1915 (PDF). Naval Staff Monographs (Historical). Vol. III. Naval Staff, Training and Staff Duties Division. 1921. pp. 209–226.
- Monograph No. 23: Home Waters Part I: From the Outbreak of War to 27 August 1914 (PDF). Naval Staff Monographs (Historical). Vol. X. Naval Staff, Training and Staff Duties Division. 1924.
- Monograph No. 29: Home Waters Part IV: From February to July 1915 (PDF). Naval Staff Monographs (Historical). Vol. XIII. Naval Staff, Training and Staff Duties Division. 1925.
- Monograph No. 30: Home Waters Part V: From July to October 1915 (PDF). Naval Staff Monographs (Historical). Vol. XIV. Naval Staff, Training and Staff Duties Division. 1926.
- Monograph No. 31: Home Waters Part VI: From October 1915 to May 1916 (PDF). Naval Staff Monographs (Historical). Vol. XV. Naval Staff, Training and Staff Duties Division. 1926.
- Monograph No. 32: Lowestoft Raid: 24th–25th April 1916 (PDF). Naval Staff Monographs (Historical). Vol. XVI. Naval Staff, Training and Staff Duties Division. 1927.
- Monograph No. 33: Home Waters Part VII: From June 1916 to November 1916 (PDF). Naval Staff Monographs (Historical). Vol. XVII. Naval Staff, Training and Staff Duties Division. 1927.
- Monograph No. 34: Home Waters Part VIII: December 1916 to April 1917 (PDF). Naval Staff Monographs (Historical). Vol. XVIII. Naval Staff, Training and Staff Duties Division. 1933.
- Monograph No. 35: Home Waters Part IX: 1st May 1917 to 31st July 1917 (PDF). Naval Staff Monographs (Historical). Vol. XIX. Naval Staff, Training and Staff Duties Division. 1939.
- Moore, John (1990). Jane's Fighting Ships of World War I. London: Studio Editions. ISBN 1-85170-378-0.
- Newbolt, Henry (1928). Naval Operations. Vol. IV. London: Longmans, Green and Co.
- Terry, C. Sanford, ed. (1919). Ostend and Zeebrugge: April 23: May 10 1918: The Dispatches of Vice-Admiral Roger Keyes K.C.B, K.V.C.O and other Narratives of the Operations. Oxford University Press.
