= Mansfield College =

Mansfield College may refer to:

- Mansfield College, Oxford, one of the constituent colleges of the University of Oxford in Oxford, England
- Mansfield College of Art, merged with Nottinghamshire Technical College in 1976 to form West Nottinghamshire College of Further Education
- Mansfield University of Pennsylvania, a public university in Mansfield, Pennsylvania, United States
- Mansfield College (Hong Kong), a former secondary school in Knutsford Terrace, Hong Kong
- Mansfield Female College, a former two-year college in Mansfield, Louisiana
