= Mansfield Park (disambiguation) =

Mansfield Park is an 1814 novel by Jane Austen.

Mansfield Park may also refer to:

== Adaptations of the novel ==
- Mansfield Park (1983 serial), a UK TV series, starring Sylvestra Le Touzel
- Mansfield Park (1999 film), a British film, starring Frances O'Connor
- Mansfield Park (2007 film), a UK TV film, starring Billie Piper
- Mansfield Park (opera), a 2011 chamber opera by Jonathan Dove and Alasdair Middleton

== Places ==
- Mansfield Park, Hawick, a rugby union ground in Hawick, Scotland
- Mansfield Park, South Australia, a suburb of Adelaide
- Mansfield Club Grounds or Mansfield Park, a former baseball field in Middletown, Connecticut, USA
