= Mansfield Township =

Mansfield Township may refer to the following places:

In Canada:

- Mansfield Township, Quebec, now part of Mansfield-et-Pontefract

In the United States:

- Mansfield Township, Michigan
- Mansfield Township, Freeborn County, Minnesota
- Mansfield Township, Burlington County, New Jersey
- Mansfield Township, Warren County, New Jersey
- Mansfield Township, Barnes County, North Dakota
