= USLHT Shrub =

US Navy minesweeper, US Coast Guard buoy tender

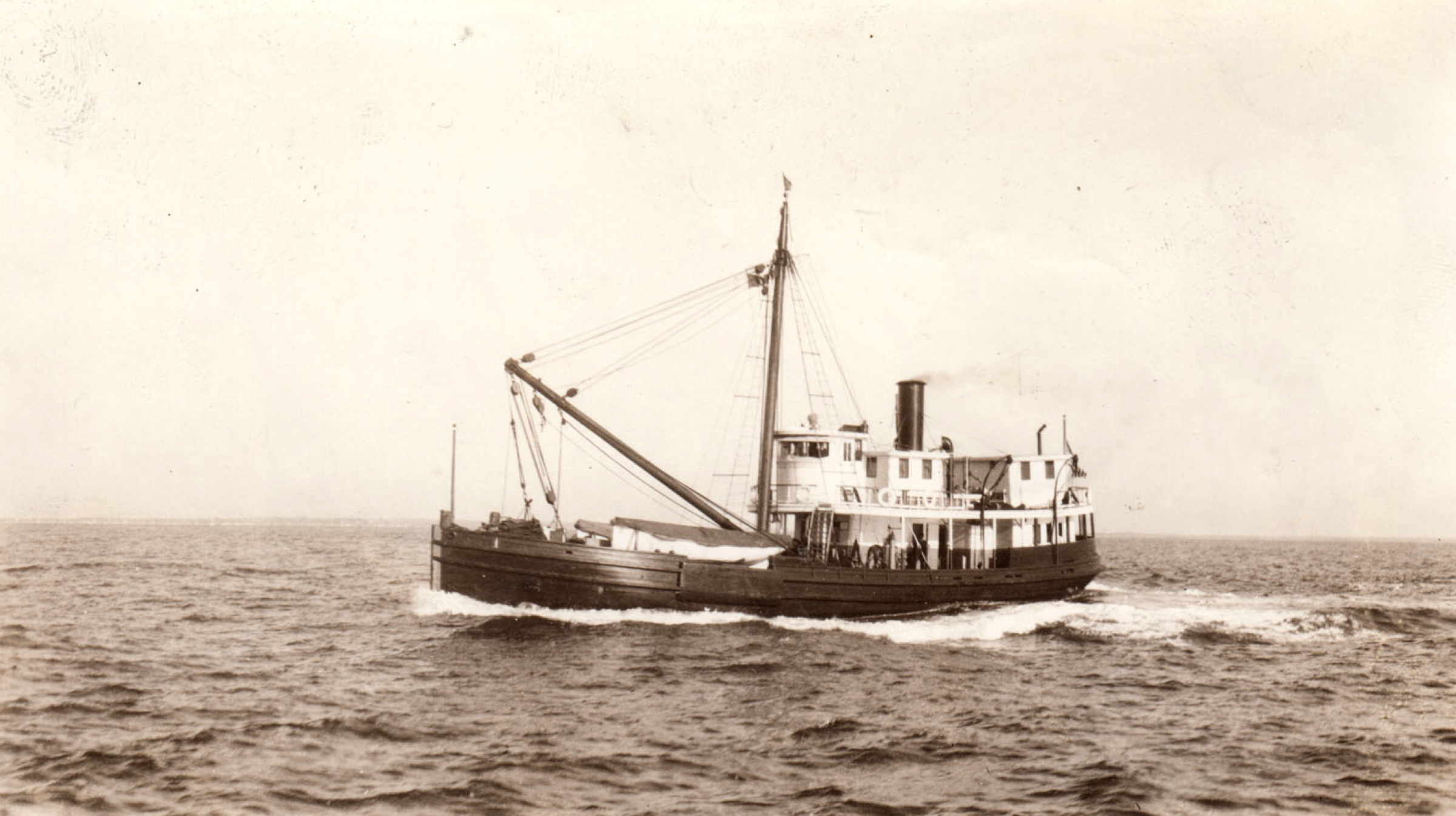
- USLHT Shrub in November 1929

History

United States
- Name: F. Mansfield and Sons Co.
- Operator: F. Mansfield and Sons Co.
- Builder: William G. Abbott Shipbuilding Co.
- Launched: 12 October 1912
- Identification: Official Number 210784
- Fate: Sold to the US Navy, 25 May 1917

United States
- Name: F. Mansfield and Sons Co., 1917; Mansfield, 1917-1919
- Operator: U.S. Navy
- Identification: Pennant SP-691; Radio call sign NBUJ; Radio call sign NUMV, 1919
- Fate: Transferred to US Lighthouse Service, 28 October 1919

United States
- Name: Shrub
- Operator: U.S. Lighthouse Service, 1919-1939; U.S. Coast Guard, 1939-1947
- Commissioned: 31 July 1927
- Decommissioned: 1 July 1947
- Identification: Penant WAGL-244; Radio call sign: GVLC, 1922-1932; Radio call sign: WWCC, 1933-1939; Radio call sign: NRWF, 1940-1947
- Fate: Sold 29 December 1947

United States
- Name: Shrub
- Operator: various private companies and individuals
- Identification: Official number 210784
- Fate: Sunk, 25 January 1963

General characteristics
- Tonnage: 214 gross register tons
- Displacement: 436 tons
- Length: 107 ft (32.6 m) overall
- Beam: 29 ft (8.8 m)
- Draft: 7 ft 5 in (2.3 m)
- Speed: 9.5 knots (10.9 mph; 17.6 km/h)

F. Mansfield and Sons Co. was built in 1912 for use as an oyster boat for a company of the same name. She had a varied career, serving as a U.S. Navy minesweeper in World War I, briefly as F. Mansfield and Sons Co. and then as Mansfield. She was transferred to the U.S Lighthouse Service where she became USLHT Shrub. After the Lighthouse Service was absorbed by the U.S. Coast Guard, she became USCGC Shrub. Shrub left government service in 1947. She was in use as a private yacht when she sank in a storm in the Bahamas in 1963. Her crew drifted to Cuba where they were briefly imprisoned as spies.

== Construction and characteristics ==
F. Mansfield and Sons Co. was commissioned by F. Mansfield and Sons Company, a seafood company specializing in oysters, based in Fair Haven, Connecticut. The ship was built by William G. Abbott Shipbuilding Co. of Milford, Delaware. She was launched on 12 October 1912 and then taken to Wilmington and Perth Amboy, New Jersey for completion. She arrived in Fair Haven to begin her wok on 21 January 1913.

The ship's hull was built of wood. She was 107 feet (33 m) long overall (100 feet (30 m) between perpendiculars), with a beam of 29 feet (8.8 m), and a mean draft of 7 feet 5 inches (2.26 m). Her depth of hold was 8 feet 6 inches (2.59 m). Her gross register tonnage was 214 and her net register tonnage was 88. She displaced 436 tons fully loaded.

Propulsion was provided by a single vertical compound steam engine. Its high-pressure cylinder had a bore of 12 inches (30 cm) and its low-pressure cylinder had a bore of 29 inches (74 cm). Its stroke was 18 inches (46 cm). The engine had an indicated horsepower of 250. Steam was provided by a single coal-fired boiler. The engine drove a single propeller giving the ship a maximum speed of 9.5 knots (10.9 mph; 17.6 km/h).

In Naval service, Mansfield was equipped with two 1-pounder guns and a radio.

Her complement as an oyster boat was a crew of 7. During her Naval service, Mansfield was crewed by 2 officers and 22 men. In the 1920s, as a lighthouse tender, Shrub had a crew of 2 officers and 13 men.

== Commercial service (1913-1917) ==
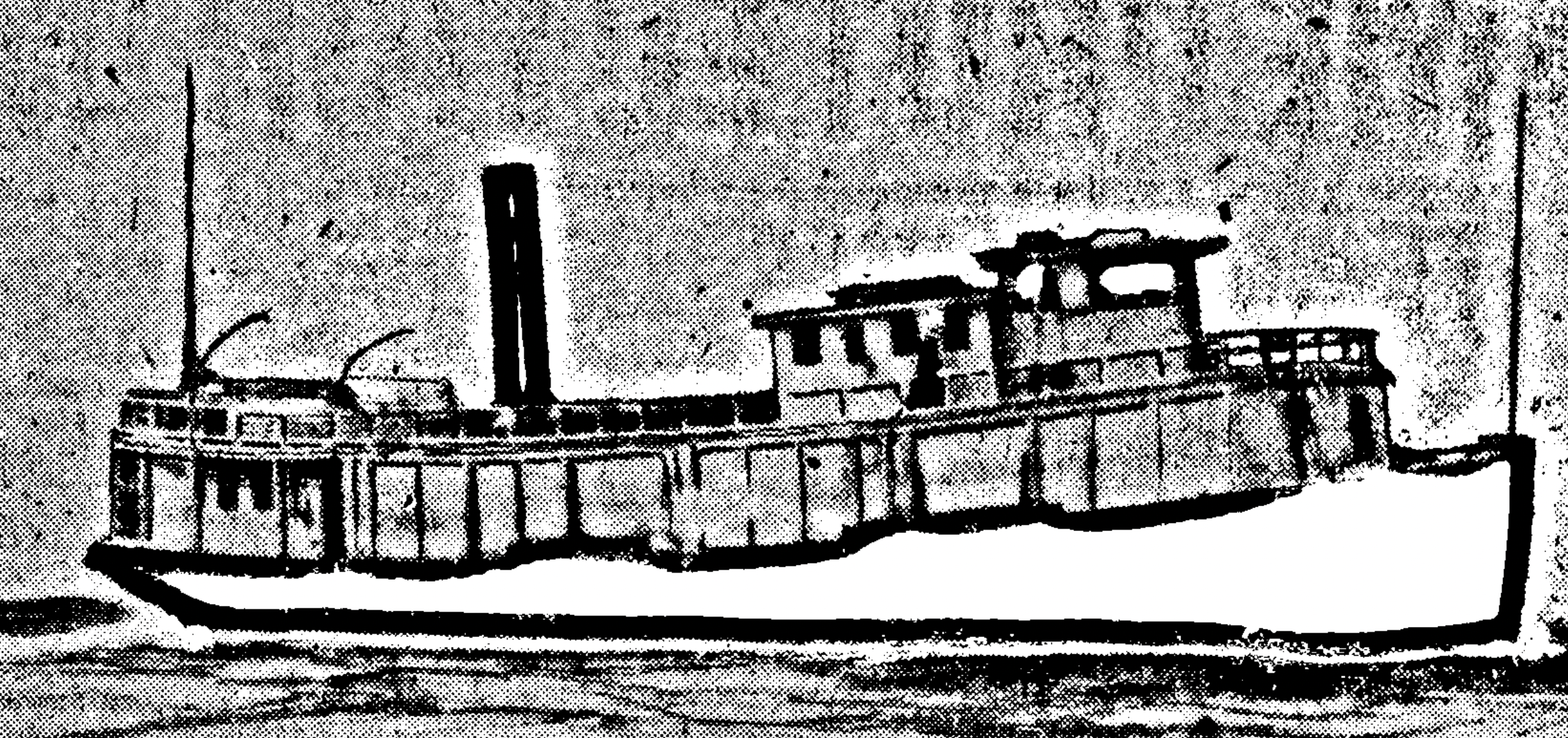
F. Mansfield and Sons Co. as she appeared in 1913

F. Mansfield and Sons Co. was used to harvest oysters by dredging in Narragansett Bay, Gardiner's Bay, and elsewhere near the Connecticut coast. She harvested 5000 bushels of oysters on one trip in 1913. Among the other maritime activities of F. Mansfield and Sons Company in which the ship may have participated was the planting of oyster shells to build oyster beds. In 1913 it poured 180,000 bushels of shells into the sea.

Newspaper reports show F. Mansfield and Sons Co. visiting several southern New England ports, including Stonington, Connecticut, New London, Connecticut, Greenport, New York, and Newport, Rhode Island.

== U.S. Navy service (1917-1919) ==
The U.S. Navy accepted the vessel 25 May 1917, paying $55,000. She was placed in non-commissioned service as F. Mansfield and Sons Co. (SP-691) on 5 June 1917. Her name was changed to simply Mansfield on 28 July 1917, in accordance with General Order No. 314, which specified that all scout patrol vessels with compound names would henceforth be known only by surname. The ship was assigned to the 2d Naval District as a minesweeper.

== U.S. Lighthouse Service (1919-1939) ==
Mansfield was transferred to the United States Lighthouse Service on 28 October 1919 for $42,000. She was converted into a lighthouse tender and commissioned on 31 July 1920 as USLHT Shrub. The conversion included substantial modifications to her deckhouse and the addition of her mast and boom. Shrub was stationed at Chelsea, Massachusetts as part of the 2nd Lighthouse District. She tended buoys along the Massachusetts coast, including the Cape Cod Canal. For several years she was assigned summer duty in the 1st Lighthouse District, where her shallow draft allowed her to service buoys in the Kennebec River, the York River, Casco Bay, the Penobscot River, and other restricted waterways.

In addition to her regular buoy tending duties, Shrub contributed in other areas. She built a new light at the harbor in Rockport, Massachusetts in 1920. In 1923, she towed the disabled fishing sloop Nobadeer, adrift off Nantucket, back to Portland, Maine, and towed to Boston the U.S. Army Quartermaster's steamer General T. S. Jessup, which was caught in ice.

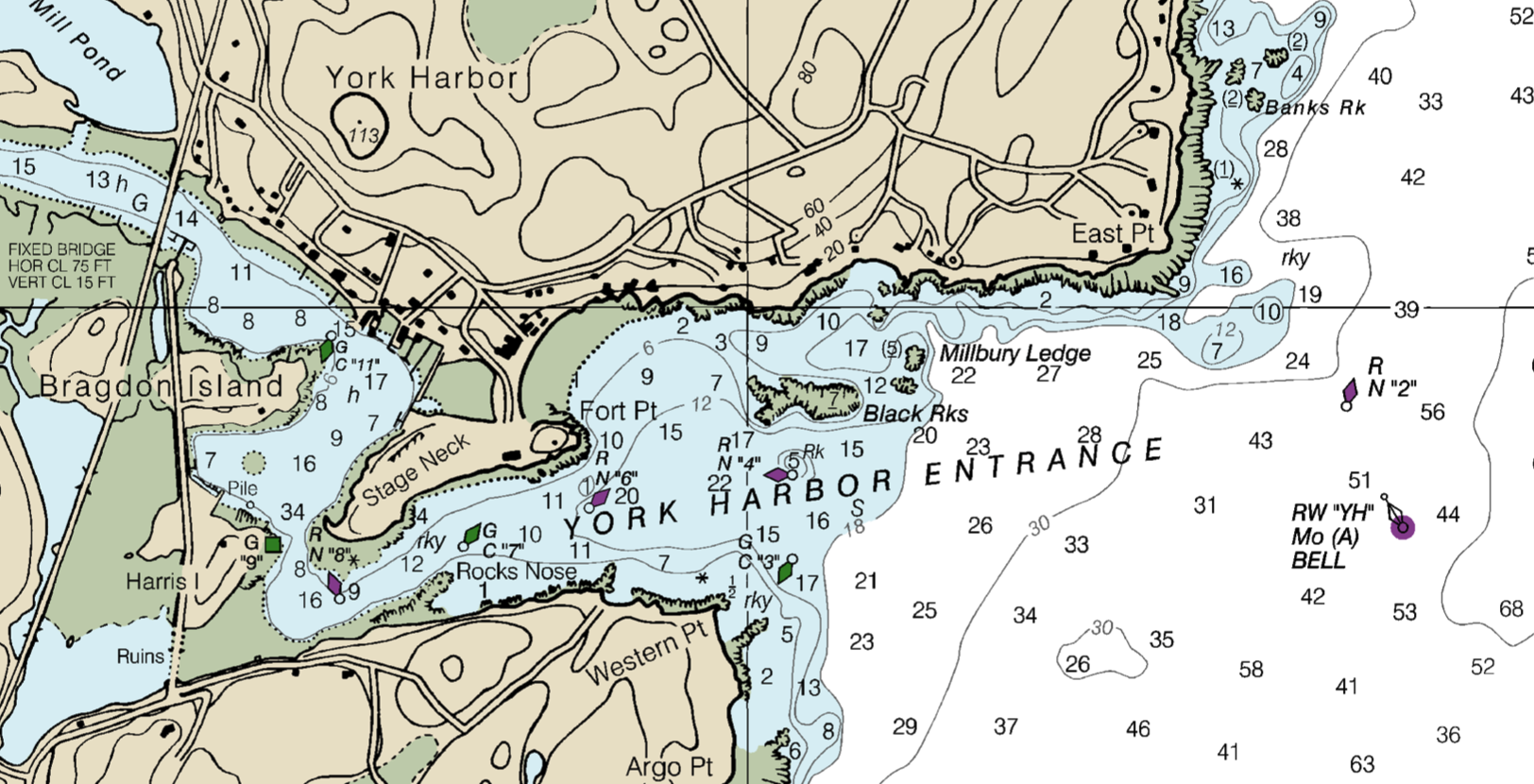
York Harbor Entrance showing Black Rocks where Shrub went aground

On 6 August 1931, Shrub was servicing buoys near the entrance to York Harbor, Maine when she went aground on Black Rock. Her hull was punctured roughly amidships and she flooded. The action of waves and tide rolled the ship off the reef and she ended up sitting on the bottom with only her mast and funnel showing. All her crew were safely recovered. On 10 August 1931, the Portland Engineering Company was awarded a contract by the Lighthouse Bureau to salvage Shrub. After several abortive attempts, Shrub was raised from the bottom on 9 September 1931. She arrived in Portland on 11 September 1931, still underwater, lashed to the underside of a scow. Shrub settled back to the bottom at a pier where attempts were made to refloat her. Finally, divers attached large patches to her hull. Two large pumps were used to bring the hull to the surface on 13 October 1931. Shrub was towed to the South Portland marine railway where she was hauled out for inspection. Damage was extensive. Aside from the damage to her hull, her entire deckhouse was gone.

The decision was made to repair the ship. She left Portland under tow by the tug Clara H. Doane on 25 October 1931 with three pumps running to prevent her sinking. She arrived in Boston the next day. Bids were solicited for her repair and the contract was won by Brewer Drydock Company of Staten Island, New York. The company's bid was $31,389 for necessary repairs, and $34,224 for necessary and optional repairs. Shrub was towed from Chelsea to Staten Island in December 1931, with a stop at Newport, Rhode Island to avoid heavy weather. The ship was recommissioned in April 1932 and resumed her previous buoy tending duties.

== U.S. Coast Guard service (1939-1947) ==
After the merger of the Lighthouse Service with the United States Coast Guard on 1 July 1939, the tender became USCGC Shrub (WAGL 244). She was assigned to the Boston Coast Guard District and continued her duties from her base in Chelsea.

During a gale in December 1939, Shrub went to the assistance of the four-masted schooner Albert F. Paul which had run aground in Narragansett Bay.

During World War II, the Boston Coast Guard District fell under the authority of the U.S. Navy's 1st Naval District. While Shrub's specific contributions to the war effort are unknown, the district's tenders were given a number of naval missions in which she likely participated. These included maintaining wreck buoys, net tending, icebreaking, rescue, salvage, and marking areas swept for mines.

At some point prior to 1941, Shrub was reassigned to the Coast Guard base at Bristol, Rhode Island.

Shrub was decommissioned by the Coast Guard on 1 July 1947 and sold on 29 December 1947.

== Private ownership (1947-1963) ==
Shrub disappears from Federal documentation after her sale by the Coast Guard in 1947. When she reappears in 1957, she was owned by Ships, Inc. of Miami Florida. Ships, Inc. was a ship broker which bought and sold a variety of surplus Navy and Coast Guard vessels. Her 1957 and subsequent documentation shows that her steam engine was removed and replaced by engines with 1200 horsepower.

In 1961 she was sold by Ships, Inc. to Richard S. Thompson of Miami, who documented the ship as a yacht. In 1962, Shrub was purchased by Betsy Ann Evers Browne, who documented the vessel as a yacht.

=== Loss of Shrub ===
Shrub sailed from Miami, Florida on a fishing, diving, and treasure-hunting expedition on 20 January 1963 with Jack W. Browne, the owner's husband, as captain. On 25 January 1963, Shrub was in Bahamian waters when her rudder broke. She anchored, but storm-driven seas opened seams in her hull and Shrub sank. Her crew of nine took to a whaleboat. They drifted for five days, finally coming ashore in Camaguey Province, Cuba. The crew were jailed as spies and interrogated by Cuban authorities. After negotiations between James B. Donovan and Fidel Castro, Shrub's crew was released and returned to the United States on 9 April 1963.
