= HMS Medway (1916) =

British M-Class destroyer, WW1

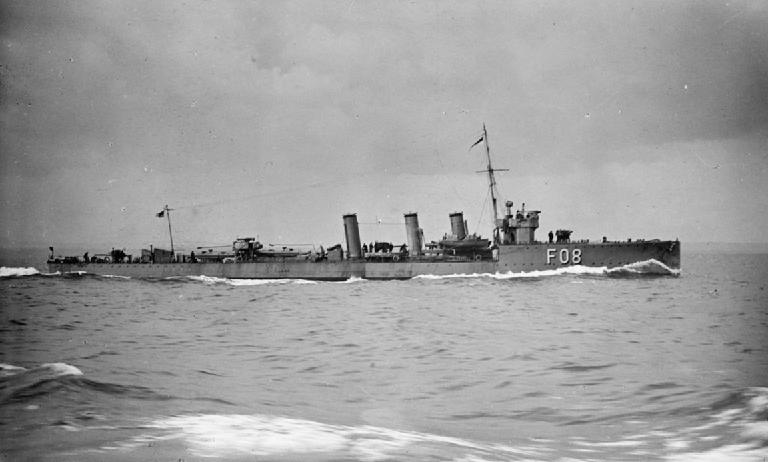
- Sistership HMS Oracle

History

United Kingdom
- Name: HMS Medway
- Namesake: River Medway
- Ordered: May 1915
- Builder: J. Samuel White, East Cowes
- Yard number: November 1915
- Launched: 19 April 1916
- Completed: 2 August 1916
- Out of service: 9 May 1921
- Fate: Broken up

General characteristics
- Class & type: Admiralty M-class destroyer
- Displacement: 994 long tons (1,010 t) (normal); 1,028 long tons (1,044 t) (Full load)
- Length: 265 ft (80.8 m) (o.a.)
- Beam: 26 ft 8 in (8.1 m)
- Draught: 8 ft 11 in (2.7 m)
- Installed power: 3 White-Forster boilers, 25,000 shp (19,000 kW)
- Propulsion: Parsons steam turbines, 3 shafts
- Speed: 34 knots (39.1 mph; 63.0 km/h)
- Range: 2,280 nmi (4,220 km) at 17 kn (31 km/h)
- Complement: 80
- Armament: 3 × single QF 4-inch (102 mm) Mark IV guns; 1 × single 2-pdr 40 mm (1.6 in) AA gun; 2 × twin 21 in (533 mm) torpedo tubes

HMS Medway was a Admiralty M-class destroyer which served with the Royal Navy during the First World War. The M class were an improvement on the previous Laforey-class, capable of higher speed. Originally laid down as HMS Redwing by J. Samuel White at East Cowes on the Isle of Wight, the vessel was renamed before being launched on 8 March 1916. The vessel was allocated to the Grand Fleet and served in the Second Battle of Heligoland Bight in support of the First Light Cruiser Squadron in their action against German light cruisers and minesweepers. During the action, the ship did not record any hits. After the War, the destroyer was placed in reserve and subsequently sold to be broken up on 9 May 1921.

== Design and development ==
Medway was one of eighteen Admiralty M-class destroyers ordered by the British Admiralty in May 1915 as part of the Fifth War Construction Programme. The M-class was an improved version of the earlier L-class destroyers, required to reach a higher speed in order to counter rumoured German fast destroyers. The remit was to have a maximum speed of 36 knots (67 km/h; 41 mph) and, although the eventual design did not achieve this, the greater performance was appreciated by the navy. It transpired that the German ships did not exist.

The destroyer had a length of 265 feet (80.8 m) between perpendiculars and 273 feet 4 inches (83 m) overall, with a beam of 26 feet 8 inches (8.1 m) and a draught of 8 feet 11 inches (2.7 m) at deep load. Displacement was 994 long tons (1,010 t) normal and 1,028 long tons (1,044 t) full load. Power was provided by three White-Forster boilers feeding three Parsons steam turbines rated at 25,000 shaft horsepower (19,000 kW) and driving three shafts, to give a design speed of 34 knots (63 km/h; 39 mph). The vessel achieved 33.5 knots (62.0 km/h; 38.6 mph) in trials. Three funnels were fitted. A total of 268 long tons (272 t) of oil could be carried, including 40 long tons (41 t) in peace tanks that were not used in wartime, giving a range of 2,280 nautical miles (4,220 km; 2,620 mi) at 17 knots (31 km/h; 20 mph).

Armament consisted of three single QF 4-inch (102 mm) Mk IV guns on the ship's centreline, with one on the forecastle, one aft on a raised platform and one between the middle and aft funnels on a bandstand. Torpedo armament consisted of two twin mounts for 21 in (533 mm) torpedoes. A single QF 2-pounder 40 mm (1.6 in) "pom-pom" anti-aircraft gun was mounted between the torpedo tubes. The ship had a complement of 80 officers and ratings.

== Construction and career ==
Redwing was laid down by J. Samuel White at East Cowes on the Isle of Wight on 2 November 1915 with the yard number 1468, and launched on 19 April 1916. The ship was completed on 30 June 1916 and joined the Grand Fleet. By this time, the ship's name had already been changed twice, initially to Medora and then subsequently Medway. The final name was in honour of the river in South East England. The vessel was deployed as part of the Grand Fleet, joining the Thirteenth Destroyer Flotilla based at Scapa Flow.

At the Second Battle of Heligoland Bight on 17 November 1917, the destroyer was one of two, the other being the more modern Vendetta, screening the First Light Cruiser Squadron as they sought to destroy a flotilla of German minesweepers. The Squadron engaged with the German light cruisers Frankfurt, Königsberg, Nürnberg and Pillau, but the destroyer scored no hits. This proved to be the last involvement by the class in a major battle during the conflict. The vessel was transferred to Buncrana with the Second Destroyer Flotilla during the last year of the war.

After the armistice, Medway was transferred Portsmouth. However, this was a temporary post and during the following year, the destroyer was moved to the local defence flotilla at Portland, operating with a reserve complement. As the Royal Navy returned to a peacetime level of mobilisation, surplus vessels were culled, and so, on 9 May 1921, Medway was sold to Thos. W. Ward of Milford Haven and subsequently broken up.

== Pennant numbers ==
Pennant number	Date
G76	September 1915
F01	January 1917
G2A	March 1918
G00	January 1919
