= HMS Noble (1915) =

British M-Class destroyer

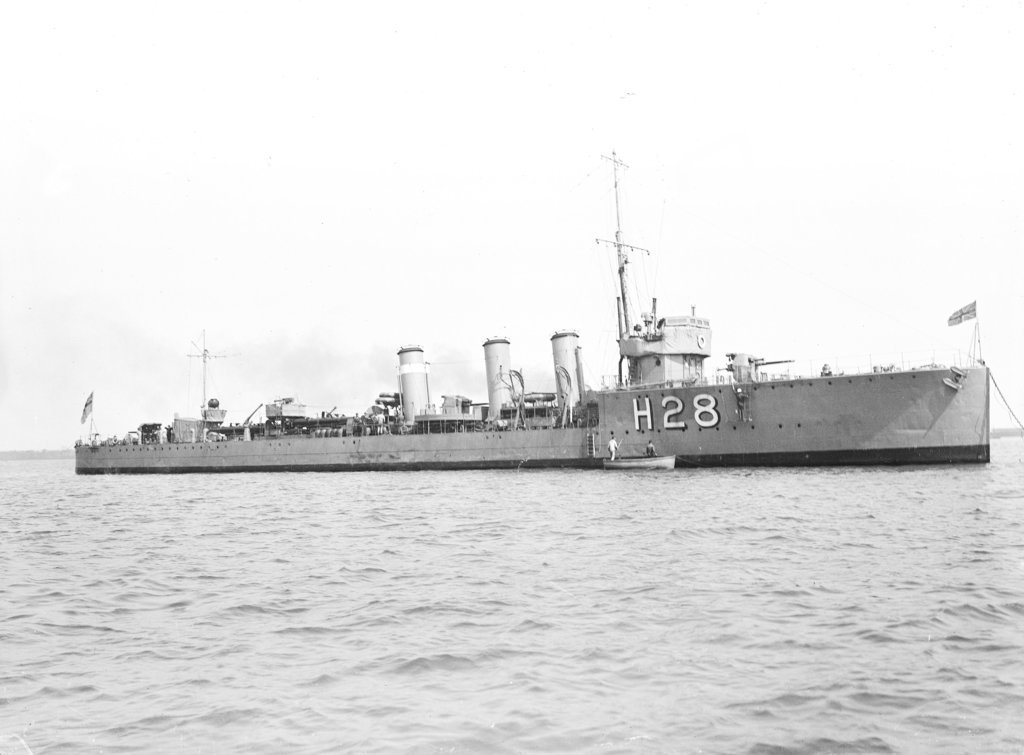
- Sister ship Orpheus

History

United Kingdom
- Name: Noble
- Ordered: November 1914
- Builder: Stephens, Linthouse
- Laid down: 2 February 1915
- Launched: 25 November 1915
- Completed: 15 February 1916
- Out of service: 8 November 1921
- Fate: Sold to be broken up

General characteristics
- Class & type: Admiralty M-class destroyer
- Displacement: 948 long tons (963 t) (normal)
- Length: 273 ft 4 in (83.3 m) (o/a); 265 feet (80.8 m) (p.p.)
- Beam: 26 ft 8 in (8.1 m)
- Draught: 8 ft 11 in (2.7 m)
- Installed power: 3 Yarrow boilers, 27,800 shp (20,700 kW)
- Propulsion: Brown-Curtiss steam turbines, 3 shafts
- Speed: 34 knots (63 km/h; 39 mph)
- Range: 2,530 nmi (4,690 km; 2,910 mi) at 15 kn (28 km/h; 17 mph)
- Complement: 80
- Armament: 3 × single QF 4-inch (102 mm) guns; 2 × single 1-pdr 37 mm (1.5 in) AA guns; 2 × twin 21 in (533 mm) torpedo tubes

HMS Noble was a Repeat Admiralty M-class destroyer that served in the Royal Navy during the First World War. The M class was an improvement on those of the preceding L class, capable of higher speed. Originally to be called Nisus, Noble was renamed before being launched in 1915. Joining the Twelfth Destroyer Flotilla of the Grand Fleet, the vessel took part in the Battle of Jutland in 1916, during which the warship unsuccessfully attacked the light cruisers of the German High Seas Fleet. In 1917, the destroyer formed part of the escort for the dreadnought battleships of the First Battle Squadron to the Second Battle of Heligoland Bight but again reported no hits. After the Armistice that ended the war, Noble was initially put in reserve and then sold in 1921 to be broken up.

== Design and development ==
Noble was one of 22 Repeat Admiralty M-class destroyers ordered by the British Admiralty in late November 1914 as part of the Third War Programme soon after the start of the First World War. The M class was an improved version of the earlier L class, required to reach a higher speed in order to counter rumoured new German fast destroyers. The remit was to have a maximum speed of 36 knots (67 km/h; 41 mph) and, although ultimately the destroyers fell short of that ambition in service, the extra performance that was achieved was valued by the Royal Navy. It transpired that the German warships did not exist. The Repeat M class differed from the prewar vessels in having a raked stem and design improvements based on wartime experience.

The destroyer had a length of 265 ft (80.8 m) between perpendiculars and 273 ft 4 in (83.3 m) overall, with a beam of 26 ft 8 in (8.1 m) and draught of 8 ft 11 in (2.7 m). Displacement was 948 long tons (963 t) normal. Power was provided by three Yarrow boilers feeding Brown-Curtiss steam turbines built by Beardmore and rated at 27,800 shaft horsepower (20,700 kW). The turbines drove three shafts and exhausted through three funnels. Design speed was 34 knots (63 km/h; 39 mph) but the vessel achieved 35.26 knots (65.30 km/h; 40.58 mph) on trials. A total of 228 long tons (232 t) of oil was carried. Design range was 2,530 nautical miles (4,690 km; 2,910 mi) at 15 knots (28 km/h; 17 mph), but actual endurance in service was less; sister ship Murray had a range of 2,240 nautical miles (4,150 km; 2,580 mi) at 15 knots (28 km/h; 17 mph).

Noble had a main armament consisting of three single QF 4-inch (102 mm) Mk IV guns on the centreline, with one on the forecastle, one aft on a raised platform and one between the middle and aft funnels. Torpedo armament consisted of two twin torpedo tubes for 21 in (533 mm) torpedoes located aft of the funnels. Two single 1-pounder 37 mm (1.5 in) "pom-pom" anti-aircraft guns were carried. The anti-aircraft guns were later replaced by 2-pdr 40 mm (1.6 in) "pom-pom" guns. The ship had a complement of 80 officers and ratings.

== Construction and career ==
Noble was initially ordered as Nisus and was laid down by Stephens on 2 February 1915 at Linthouse. Renamed before being launched on 25 November, the vessel was completed by Beardmore on 15 February the following year. The ship was the first to be named Noble in service with the Royal Navy and was deployed as part of the Grand Fleet, joining the Twelfth Destroyer Flotilla based at Scapa Flow.

On 30 May, the destroyer sailed with the Grand Fleet to confront the German High Seas Fleet in what would be the Battle of Jutland, forming part of the Second Division of the Flotilla along with sister ship Maenad. The vessel was deployed in action against the German light cruisers Frankfurt and Pillau. Noble followed Maenad into the fray but was not able to fire any torpedoes before the cruisers pulled out of range. It is likely that Maenad's manoeuvring obscured the destroyer's line of sight during the attack. The destroyers, along with the rest of the flotilla, returned to Scapa Flow on 2 June. The flotilla subsequently took part in a large exercise with other flotillas and fleets of the Grand Fleet, led by the dreadnought battleship Iron Duke, between 22 and 24 November.

During 1917, the Twelfth Destroyer Flotilla was involved in anti-submarine operations, and for nine days from 15 June the destroyer was stationed off the north of Scotland. The operation did not lead to the destruction of any submarines and the Admiralty increasingly redeployed the destroyers of the Grand Fleet to escort convoys. Nonetheless, on 15 October, Noble formed part of a large-scale operation, involving 30 cruisers and 54 destroyers deployed in eight groups across the North Sea in an attempt to stop a suspected sortie by German naval forces. The vessel, along with fellow destroyer Menace, was despatched from the flotilla to operate with the Third Light Cruiser Squadron. Despite these measures, the German light cruisers Bremse and Brummer managed to attack the regular convoy between Norway and Britain two days later, sinking two destroyers, Mary Rose and Strongbow, and nine merchant ships before returning safely to Germany. On 17 November, the destroyer sailed as part of the escort for the First Battle Squadron led by the dreadnought battleship Revenge. The warship saw no action and reported no hits in the ensuing Second Battle of Heligoland Bight. At the end of the war, Noble was a member of the Third Destroyer Flotilla.

After the Armistice that ended the war in 1918, the Royal Navy returned to a peacetime level of strength and both the number of ships and personnel needed to be reduced to save money. The destroyer was transferred to reserve at Devonport. However, the harsh conditions of wartime operations, exacerbated by the fact that the hull was not galvanised, meant that the ship was soon worn out. Noble was retired, and, on 8 November 1921, was sold to Slough TC to be broken up.

== Pennant numbers ==
| Pennant number | Date |
|---|---|
| G09 | September 1915 |
| G37 | January 1917 |
| G38 | January 1918 |
| G9A | June 1918 |
| H48 | January 1919 |
