= SMS Königsberg (1915) =

Light cruiser of the German Imperial Navy

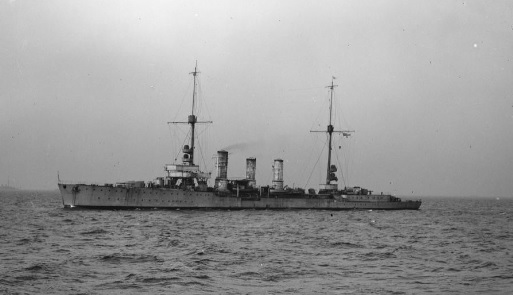
- One of Königsberg's sister ships en route to Scapa Flow

History

German Empire
- Name: Königsberg
- Namesake: Königsberg
- Ordered: 1913
- Builder: AG Weser, Bremen
- Laid down: 22 August 1914
- Launched: 18 December 1915
- Commissioned: 12 August 1916
- Stricken: 31 May 1920
- Fate: Ceded to France, 1920

History

France
- Name: Metz
- Namesake: Metz
- Acquired: 20 July 1920
- Commissioned: November 1921
- Decommissioned: 1928
- Stricken: 18 August 1933
- Fate: Scrapped in 1936

General characteristics
- Class & type: Königsberg-class cruiser (1915)
- Displacement: Normal: 5,440 t (5,350 long tons); Full load: 7,125 t (7,012 long tons)
- Length: 151.4 m (496 ft 9 in)
- Beam: 14.2 m (46 ft 7 in)
- Draft: 5.96 m (19 ft 7 in)
- Installed power: 31,000 shp (23,000 kW); 12 × water-tube boilers
- Propulsion: 2 × screw propellers; 2 × steam turbines
- Speed: 27.5 knots (50.9 km/h)
- Range: 4,850 nmi (8,980 km; 5,580 mi) at 12 kn (22 km/h; 14 mph)
- Crew: 17 officers; 458 enlisted men
- Armament: 8 × 15 cm (5.9 in) SK L/45 guns; 2 × 8.8 cm (3.5 in) SK L/45 guns; 4 × 50 cm (19.7 in) torpedo tubes; 200 mines
- Armor: Belt: 60 mm (2.4 in); Deck: 60 cm; Conning tower: 100 mm (3.9 in)

SMS Königsberg was the lead ship of the Königsberg class of light cruisers, built for the German Kaiserliche Marine (Imperial Navy) during World War I. She took the name of the earlier Königsberg, which had been destroyed during the Battle of Rufiji Delta in 1915. The new ship was laid down in 1914 at the AG Weser shipyard, launched in December 1915, and commissioned into the High Seas Fleet in August 1916. Armed with eight 15 cm SK L/45 guns, the ship had a top speed of 27.5 kn (50.9 km/h; 31.6 mph).

Königsberg saw action with the II Scouting Group; in September 1917 she participated in Operation Albion, a large amphibious operation against the Baltic islands in the Gulf of Riga. Two months later, she was attacked by British battlecruisers in the Second Battle of Heligoland Bight. She was hit by the battlecruiser HMS Repulse, which caused a large fire and reduced her speed significantly. She escaped behind the cover of two German battleships, however. She was to have taken part in a sortie by the entire High Seas Fleet to attack the British Grand Fleet in the final days of the war, but unrest broke out that forced the cancellation of the plan. The ship carried Rear Admiral Hugo Meurer to Scapa Flow to negotiate the plan for interning the High Seas Fleet. Königsberg was not interned, however, so she escaped the scuttling of the German fleet and was instead ceded to France as a war prize. She was renamed Metz and served with the French Navy until 1933, before being scrapped in 1936.

== Design ==
Design work began on the Königsberg-class cruisers before construction had begun on their predecessors of the Wiesbaden class. The new ships were broadly similar to the earlier cruisers, with only minor alterations in the arrangement of some components, including the forward broadside guns, which were raised a level to reduce their tendency to be washed out in heavy seas. They were also fitted with larger conning towers.

Königsberg was 151.4 meters (496 ft 9 in) long overall and had a beam of 14.2 m (46 ft 7 in) and a draft of 5.96 m (19 ft 7 in) forward. She displaced 5,440 t (5,350 long tons) normally and up to 7,125 t (7,012 long tons) at full load. The ship had a fairly small superstructure that consisted primarily of a conning tower forward. She was fitted with a pair of pole masts, the fore just aft of the conning tower and the mainmast further aft. Her hull had a long forecastle that extended for the first third of the ship, stepping down to main deck level just aft of the conning tower, before reducing a deck further at the mainmast for a short quarterdeck. The ship had a crew of 17 officers and 458 enlisted men.

Her propulsion system consisted of two sets of steam turbines that drove a pair of screw propellers. Steam was provided by ten coal-fired and two oil-fired Marine-type water-tube boilers that were vented through three funnels. The engines were rated to produce 31,000 shaft horsepower (23,000 kW), which provided a top speed of 27.5 knots (50.9 km/h; 31.6 mph). At a more economical cruising speed of 12 knots (22 km/h; 14 mph), the ship had a range of 4,850 nautical miles (8,980 km; 5,580 mi).

The ship was armed with a main battery of eight 15 cm (5.9 in) SK L/45 guns in single pedestal mounts. Two were placed side by side forward on the forecastle, four were located amidships, two on either side, and two were arranged in a superfiring pair aft. They were supplied with 1,040 rounds of ammunition, for 130 shells per gun. Königsberg also carried two 8.8 cm SK L/45 anti-aircraft guns mounted on the centerline astern of the funnels. She was also equipped with a pair of 50 cm (19.7 in) torpedo tubes with eight torpedoes in deck-mounted swivel launchers amidships. She also carried 200 mines.

The ship was protected by a waterline armor belt that was 60 mm (2.4 in) thick amidships. Protection for the ship's internals was reinforced with a curved armor deck that was 60 mm thick; the deck sloped downward at the sides and connected to the bottom edge of the belt armor. The conning tower had 100 mm (3.9 in) thick sides.

== Service history ==
Königsberg was ordered under the contract name "Ersatz Gazelle", (Note: German warships were ordered under provisional names. Additions to the fleet were given a single letter; ships intended to replace older or lost vessels were ordered as "Ersatz (name of the ship to be replaced)".) and was laid down at the AG Weser shipyard in Bremen on 22 August 1914, less than a month after the outbreak of World War I. She was launched on 18 December 1915 without fanfare, after which fitting-out work commenced. She was commissioned into the High Seas Fleet on 12 August 1916, and on 29 October she joined II Scouting Group as its new flagship. The following day, Kapitän zur See (KzS—Captain at Sea) Ludwig von Reuter hoisted his flag aboard the ship and thereafter the ship participated in coastal defense patrols in the German Bight. At the time, II Scouting Group also included the light cruisers Pillau, Frankfurt, Graudenz, and Regensburg. The ships were primarily tasked with supporting the defenses of the German North Sea coast, as the fleet commander, Vizeadmiral (VAdm—Vice Admiral) Reinhard Scheer had by that time abandoned offensive operations with the surface fleet in favor of the U-boat campaign. In 1917, patrol duties were interrupted with individual and unit training in the Baltic Sea from 22 February to 4 March and again from 20 May to 2 June. Königsberg went to the shipyard in Wilhelmshaven for repairs from 16 August to 9 September.

=== Operation Albion ===
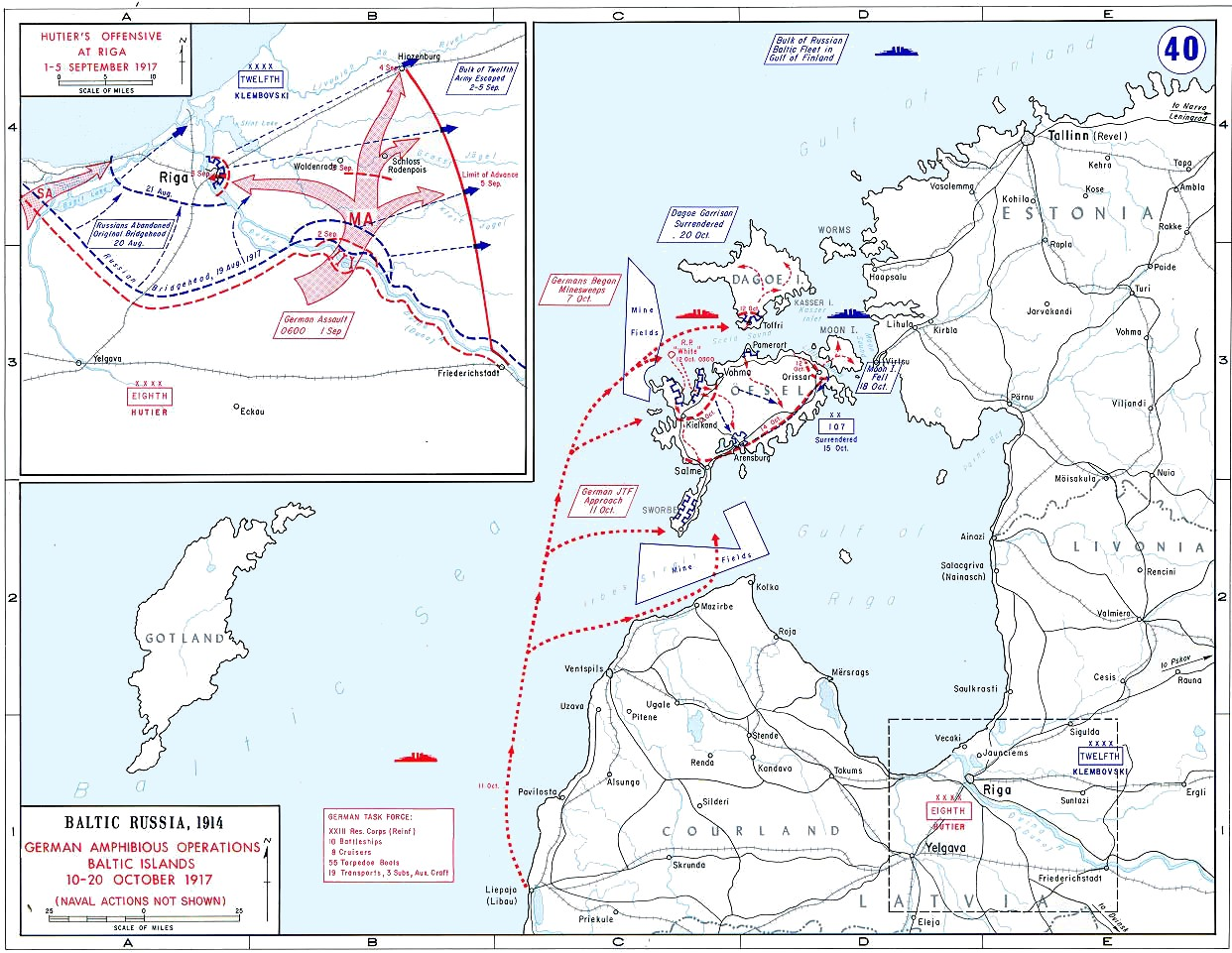
Operations of the German Navy and Army during Operation Albion

After the repair work was completed, Königsberg steamed to the Baltic to take part in Operation Albion, the amphibious assault on the islands in the Gulf of Riga after the German Army captured the city during the Battle of Riga the month before. In addition, the German fleet sought to eliminate the Russian naval forces in the Gulf of Riga that still threatened German forces in the city. The Admiralstab (the Navy High Command) planned an operation to seize the Baltic island of Ösel, and specifically the Russian gun batteries on the Sworbe Peninsula. The ship joined the task force in Kiel on 23 September; she and the rest of II Scouting Group were tasked with escorting the troop transports and Königsberg was also made the flagship of IV Transport Group for the operation. Generalleutnant (Lieutenant General) Ludwig von Estorff, the commander of the 42nd Division, came aboard the ship during the cruise from Kiel. The invasion fleet stopped in Libau on 25 September to make final preparations, and on 11 October the Germans began the voyage to the Gulf.

The operation began on the morning of 12 October, when Moltke and the III Squadron ships engaged Russian positions in Tagga Bay while IV Squadron shelled Russian gun batteries on the Sworbe Peninsula on Saaremaa. Königsberg steamed in Tagga Bay, where Estorff coordinated the operations of the German infantry, who quickly subdued Russian opposition. On 18–19 October, Königsberg and the rest of II Scouting Group covered minesweepers operating off the island of Dagö, but due to insufficient minesweepers and bad weather, the operation was postponed. On the 19th, Königsberg, her sister ship Nürnberg, and the cruiser Danzig were sent to intercept two Russian torpedo boats reported to be in the area. Reuter could not locate the vessels and so broke off the operation. By 20 October, the islands were under German control and the Russian naval forces had either been destroyed or forced to withdraw. The Admiralstab ordered the naval component to return to the North Sea. On 28 October, Königsberg returned to Libau and proceeded back to the North Sea to resume her guard duties there with the rest of II Scouting Group.

=== Second Battle of Helgoland Bight ===
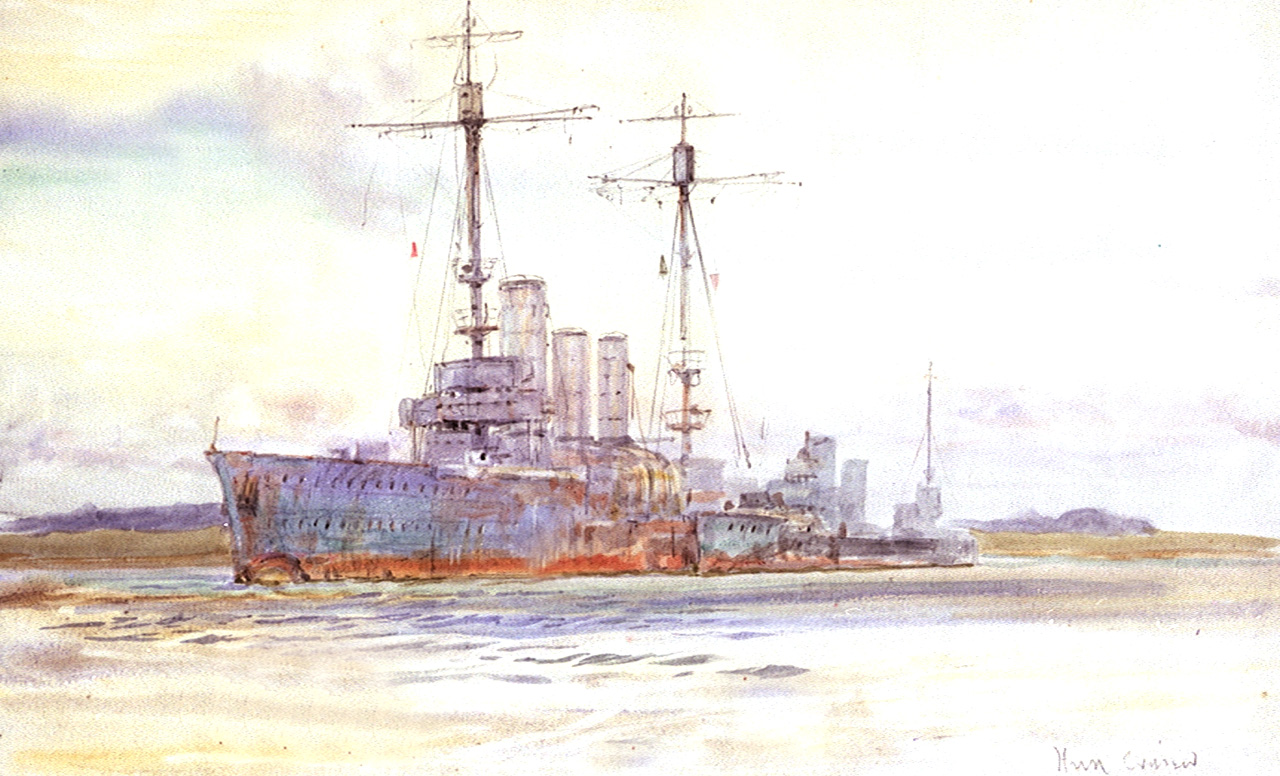
Königsberg's sister ship Karlsruhe

On 17 November, Königsberg saw action at the Second Battle of Helgoland Bight. Along with three other cruisers from II Scouting Group and a group of torpedo boats, Königsberg escorted minesweepers clearing paths in minefields laid by the British in the area of Horns Rev. The dreadnought battleships Kaiser and Kaiserin stood by in distant support. Reuter had sent Nürnberg forward while he remained further back with the ships of II Minensuchflotille (Minesweeper Flotilla). The British 1st Cruiser Squadron and the 6th Light Cruiser Squadron, supported by the 1st Battlecruiser Squadron, sortied to attack the operation. After the British opened fire, Reuter sought to use his ships to distract the British from the minesweepers while laying a smoke screen to cover their withdrawal. He also hoped to draw the British cruisers toward the two dreadnoughts.

As the battle developed, the British battlecruisers HMS Courageous, Glorious, and Repulse joined the action. Once Kaiserin and Kaiser arrived on the scene, Reuter launched a counterattack, during which Repulse scored a hit on Königsberg with a 38 cm (15 in) shell at 10:58. The shell knocked all three of her funnels over and caused a fire, which significantly reduced her speed to 17 kn (31 km/h; 20 mph). Reuter transferred to Pillau while Königsberg withdrew so her crew could fight the fire; after the fire was suppressed she rejoined the German squadron. The presence of the German battleships led the British to break off the attack. Further German reinforcements arrived, including the battlecruisers Hindenburg and Moltke at 13:30 and the dreadnoughts Friedrich der Grosse and König Albert at 13:50.

With these forces assembled, the IV Battle Squadron commander aboard Friedrich der Grosse, VAdm Wilhelm Souchon, conducted a sweep for any remaining British vessels but could find none. At 15:00, the German ships withdrew from the area and Königsberg anchored in the Schillig roadstead at 19:05. In the course of the battle, Königsberg had suffered twenty-three casualties, of whom eight died. The commander of Kaiserin, Kurt Graßhoff, was later criticized for failing to intervene quickly enough, leading to the development of new guidelines for placing battleships closer to minesweeper groups in the future. From 19 November to 15 December, Königsberg was in the shipyard in Wilhelmshaven for repairs.

=== Later operations ===
Reuter came back aboard his flagship and Königsberg resumed patrol duties in the German Bight on 17 December. On 20 January 1918, Reuter was replaced by KzS Magnus von Levetzow. II Scouting Group conducted exercises in the Baltic from 21 January to 7 February, after which they returned to the North Sea. They took part in the abortive fleet operation on 23–24 April to attack British convoys to Norway. I Scouting Group and II Scouting Group, along with the Second Torpedo-Boat Flotilla were to attack a heavily guarded British convoy to Norway, with the rest of the High Seas Fleet steaming in support. While steaming off the Utsira Lighthouse in southern Norway, Moltke had a serious accident with her machinery, which led Scheer to break off the operation and return to port.

From 10 to 13 May, Königsberg and the rest of II Scouting Group escorted the minelayer Senta while the latter vessel laid a defensive minefield to block British submarines form operating in the German Bight. The ships conducted additional training in the Baltic from 11 to 12 July. Levetzow left the unit later in July for the meetings that led to the formation of the Seekriegsleitung (SKL—Maritime Warfare Command); during this period, Karlsruhe's commander served as the commander of the group. Levetzow returned on 5 August, though he was replaced the following day by KzS Victor Harder, who also used Königsberg as his flagship.

In October 1918, Königsberg and the rest of II Scouting Group were to lead a final attack on the British navy. Königsberg, Cöln, Dresden, and Pillau were to attack merchant shipping in the Thames estuary while Karlsruhe, Nürnberg, and Graudenz were to bombard targets in Flanders, to draw out the British Grand Fleet. Scheer, promoted to Großadmiral and placed in charge of the SKL, and the new fleet commander Admiral Franz von Hipper intended to inflict as much damage as possible on the British navy, in order to secure a better bargaining position for Germany, whatever the cost to the fleet. On the morning of 29 October 1918, the order was given to sail from Wilhelmshaven the following day. Starting on the night of 29 October, sailors on Thüringen and then on several other battleships mutinied. The unrest ultimately forced Hipper and Scheer to cancel the operation. When informed of the situation, the Kaiser stated, "I no longer have a navy."

While disorder consumed the bulk of the fleet, Kommodore Andreas Michelsen organized a group to attack any British attempt to take advantage of the fleet's disarray. He pieced together a group of around sixty ships, including Königsberg and several other light cruisers. On 9 November, reports of British activity in the German Bight prompted Königsberg and several destroyers to make a sweep. After the reports proved false, the flotilla returned to Borkum, where they learned of the Kaiser's abdication. Following the Armistice that ended the fighting, Königsberg took Rear Admiral Hugo Meurer to Scapa Flow to negotiate with Admiral David Beatty, the commander of the Grand Fleet, for the place of internment of the German fleet. The ship arrived in Scapa Flow on 15 November, flying a white flag. The accepted arrangement was for the High Seas Fleet to meet the combined Allied fleet in the North Sea and proceed to the Firth of Forth before transferring to Scapa Flow, where they would be interned. Most of the High Seas Fleet's ships, including Königsberg's sister ships Karlsruhe, Emden, and Nürnberg, were interned in the British naval base in Scapa Flow, under the command of Reuter. Königsberg instead remained in Germany, returning Meurer from the negotiations with Beatty by the time the fleet left for internment.

=== Service with the French Navy ===
Following the scuttling of the German fleet at Scapa Flow in June 1919, the Allied powers issued a demand on 1 November for the surrender of five cruisers, including Königsberg, to replace vessels that had been sunk. Königsberg was stricken from the naval register on 31 May 1920 and on 14 July, she left Germany in company with the cruisers Pillau, Stralsund, and Strassburg and four torpedo-boats. They arrived in Cherbourg, France, over the course of 19–20 July. She was ceded to France as "A" and was renamed Metz on 6 October for service with the French fleet. She was not significantly modified in French service, the primary change being the replacement of her 8.8 cm guns with 75 mm (3 in) anti-aircraft guns. She also had her submerged torpedo tubes removed and the above-water tubes were replaced with 60 mm (2.4 in) versions. After entering service in November 1921, Metz was assigned to the Atlantic Light Division, but she served here only briefly before being transferred to the French Mediterranean Fleet in early 1922. Here, she served with the other ex-German cruisers Mulhouse and Strasbourg and the ex-Austro-Hungarian Thionville in the 3rd Light Division (which was renamed the 2nd Light division in December 1926).

In October 1922 she carried Henry Franklin-Bouillon to Turkey to take part in the negotiations that led to the Treaty of Lausanne, which finally ended World War I for Turkey, which had spawned the Turkish War of Independence of 1919–1922. In the mid-1920s, she participated in the Rif War. On 7 September 1925, she and the battleship Paris and another ex-German cruiser, Strasbourg, supported a landing of French troops in North Africa. The three ships provided heavy gunfire support to the landing troops. In 1927, Metz was transferred to the French Atlantic Fleet, though she served here only through 1928 when the entire division of ex-German cruisers was deactivated and stationed in Brest; this coincided with the commissioning of the new Duguay-Trouin-class light cruisers. While there, Metz had her aft funnels and her main mast removed. In 1929, the ship transferred to Landévennec, still in reserve. She was stricken from the naval register on 18 August 1933 and sold to ship breakers in 1934. While in the breakers' yard in December that year, Metz caught fire. Scrapping work was completed by 1936 at Brest.
