= German submarine U-89 =

U-89 may refer to one of the following German submarines:

- SM U-89, a Type U 87 submarine launched in 1916 and that served in the First World War until sunk on 12 February 1918
  - During the First World War, Germany also had this submarine with a similar name:
    - SM UB-89, a Type UB III submarine launched in 1917 and sunk on 21 October 1918 after collision with SM Frankfurt; raised 30 October 1918; drifted off course on way to surrender on 7 March 1919; taken to IJmuiden and broken up at Dordrecht in 1920
- German submarine U-89 (1941), a Type VIIC submarine that served in the Second World War until sunk on 12 May 1943
