= HMS Tristram =

Destroyer of the Royal Navy

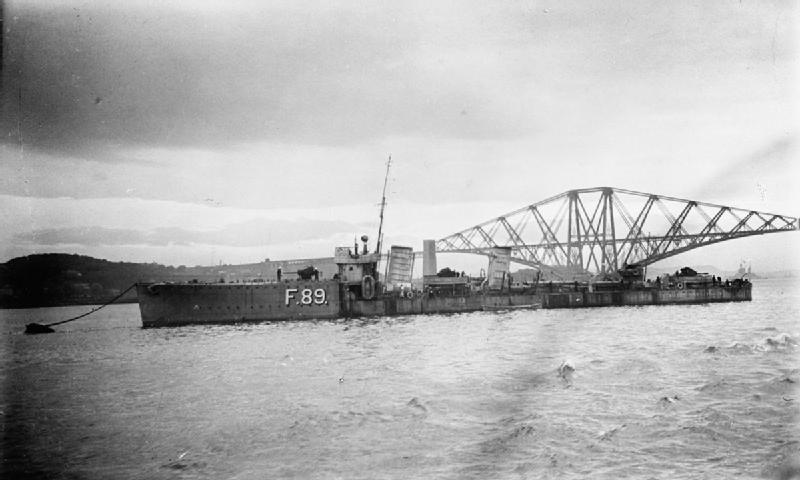
- HMS Tristram

History

United Kingdom
- Name: HMS Tristram
- Namesake: Tristram
- Builder: J. Samuel White, Cowes
- Laid down: 23 September 1916
- Launched: 24 February 1917
- Commissioned: 30 June 1917
- Out of service: 9 May 1921
- Fate: Broken up

General characteristics
- Class & type: Modified Admiralty R-class destroyer
- Displacement: 1,085 long tons (1,102 t) (deep load)
- Length: 276 ft (84 m) (o.a.)
- Beam: 27 ft (8 m)
- Draught: 11 ft (3 m)
- Propulsion: 3 White-Forster boilers; 2 geared Brown-Curtis steam turbines, 27,000 shp (20,000 kW)
- Speed: 36 knots (41.4 mph; 66.7 km/h)
- Range: 3,450 nmi (6,390 km) at 15 kn (28 km/h)
- Complement: 82
- Armament: 3 × single QF 4-inch (102 mm) guns; 1 × single 2-pdr 40 mm (1.6 in) AA gun; 2 × twin 21 in (533 mm) torpedo tubes

HMS Tristram was a modified Admiralty R-class destroyer that served in the Royal Navy during the First World War. The Modified R class added attributes of the Yarrow Later M class to improve the capability of the ships to operate in bad weather. Launched in 1917, the destroyer was operational for just over four years. In 1917, Tristram joined the Grand Fleet and provided distant cover at the Second Battle of Heligoland Bight but did not engage with the enemy. After the armistice which ended the war, the destroyer was initially transferred to the Home Fleet before being placed in reserve in 1920 and then sold to be broken up in 1921.

== Design and development ==
Tristram was one of eleven Modified R-class destroyers ordered by the British Admiralty in March 1916 as part of the Eighth War Construction Programme. The design was a development of the existing R class, adding features from the Yarrow Later M class which had been introduced based on wartime experience. The forward two boilers were transposed and vented through a single funnel, enabling the bridge and forward gun to be placed further aft. Combined with hull-strengthening, this improved the destroyers' ability to operate at high speed in bad weather.

Tristram was 276 feet (84 m) long overall and 265 feet (81 m) long between perpendiculars, with a beam of 27 feet (8 m) and a draught of 11 feet (3 m). Displacement was 1,035 long tons (1,052 t) normal and 1,085 long tons (1,102 t) at deep load. Power was provided by three White-Forster boilers feeding two Brown-Curtis geared steam turbines rated at 27,000 shaft horsepower (20,000 kW) and driving two shafts, to give a design speed of 36 knots (67 km/h; 41 mph). Two funnels were fitted. A total of 296 long tons (301 t) of fuel oil were carried, giving a design range of 3,450 nautical miles (6,390 km; 3,970 mi) at 15 knots (28 km/h; 17 mph).

Armament consisted of three single QF 4-inch (102 mm) Mk V guns on the ship's centreline, with one on the forecastle, one aft on a raised platform and one between the funnels. Increased elevation extended the range of the gun by 1,800 metres (2,000 yd) to 11,000 metres (12,000 yd). A single 2-pounder 40 mm (1.6 in) "pom-pom anti-aircraft gun was carried on a platform between two twin mounts for 21 in (533 mm) torpedoes. The ship had a complement of 82 officers and ratings.

== Construction and career ==
Tristram was laid down by J. Samuel White at East Cowes on the Isle of Wight on 23 September 1916 with the yard number 1482, and launched on 24 February the following year. The vessel was completed on 30 June. The ship was the first to be named after Tristam, a legendary knight and follower of King Arthur.

On commissioning, Tristram joined the Thirteenth Destroyer Flotilla of the Grand Fleet. On 16 November 1917, Tristram was part of the destroyer screen for the 1st Battlecruiser Squadron, led by Lion, that provided distant cover at the Second Battle of Heligoland Bight but did not engage with the enemy. The flotilla took part in the Royal Navy's engagement with one of the final sorties of the German High Seas Fleet during the First World War, on 24 April 1918, although the two fleets did not actually meet and the destroyer was unharmed. The vessel remained with the Thirteenth Flotilla until 1919.

As the Royal Navy returned to a peacetime level of strength after the armistice, both the number of ships and personnel needed to be reduced to save money. When the Grand Fleet was disbanded, Tristram was transferred to the Home Fleet, under the Flag of King George V, and was moved to the Reserve Fleet in 1920. In 1923, the Navy decided to retire many of the older destroyers in preparation for the introduction of newer and larger vessels. The ship was sold to Thos W Ward of Briton Ferry on 9 May 1921 and breaking up started on 29 August 1924.

== Pennant numbers ==
| Pennant number | Date |
|---|---|
| F89 | January 1917 |
| F25 | January 1918 |
| F11 | January 1919 |
