= HMS Napier (1915) =

British M-Class destroyer

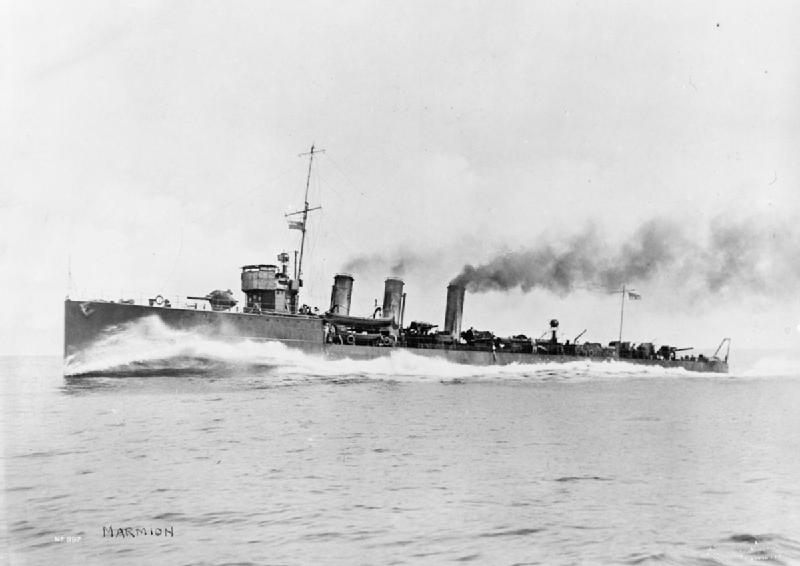
- Sister ship HMS Marmion

History

United Kingdom
- Name: HMS Napier
- Namesake: Charles Napier
- Ordered: February 1915
- Builder: John Brown & Company, Clydebank
- Yard number: 444
- Laid down: 6 July 1915
- Launched: 27 November 1915
- Completed: 22 January 1916
- Out of service: 8 November 1921
- Fate: Sold to be broken up

General characteristics
- Class & type: Admiralty M-class destroyer
- Displacement: 860 long tons (870 t) (normal); 1,021 long tons (1,037 t) (full load)
- Length: 273 ft 8 in (83.4 m) o/a
- Beam: 26 ft 9 in (8.2 m)
- Draught: 16 ft 3 in (5.0 m)
- Installed power: 3 Yarrow boilers, 25,000 shp (19,000 kW)
- Propulsion: Brown-Curtis steam turbines, 3 shafts
- Speed: 34 knots (63 km/h; 39 mph)
- Range: 2,280 nmi (4,220 km; 2,620 mi) at 17 kn (31 km/h; 20 mph)
- Complement: 80
- Armament: 3 × single QF 4-inch (102 mm) Mark IV guns; 1 × single 2-pdr 40 mm (1.6 in) AA gun; 2 × twin 21 in (533 mm) torpedo tubes

HMS Napier was a Repeat Admiralty M-class destroyer which served in the Royal Navy during the First World War. The M class were an improvement on the previous L-class destroyer, capable of higher speed. The vessel was launched on 27 November 1915 and joined the Grand Fleet. Napier had a varied war career, acting as part of the destroyer screen for the First Battle Squadron during the Second Battle of Heligoland Bight and searching for the survivors of losses like the armoured cruiser HMS Hampshire. The vessel was usually based at Scapa Flow but spent a brief time seconded to the Harwich Force in 1917. After the Armistice that marked the end of the First World War, Napier was placed in reserve before being decommissioned and sold to be broken up on 8 November 1921.

== Design and development ==
Napier was one of sixteen Admiralty M-class destroyer destroyers ordered by the British Admiralty in February 1915 as part of the Fourth War Construction Programme. The M class was an improved version of the earlier L-class destroyers, required to reach a higher speed in order to counter rumoured German fast destroyers. The remit was to have a maximum speed of 36 knots (67 km/h; 41 mph) and, although the eventual design did not achieve this, the greater performance was appreciated by the navy. It transpired that the German ships did not exist. The vessel was termed a Repeat M and differed from previous members of the class in having a raked stem. Napier was also fitted with a raked bow, which proved sufficient advantage that it was replicated in future designs, including the Parker-class flotilla leaders.

The destroyer was 273 feet 8 inches (83.4 m) long overall, with a beam of 26 feet 9 inches (8.2 m) and a draught of 16 feet 3 inches (5.0 m). Displacement was 860 long tons (870 t) normal and 1,021 long tons (1,037 t) full load. Power was provided by three Yarrow boilers feeding Brown-Curtis steam turbines rated at 25,000 shaft horsepower (19,000 kW) and driving three shafts to give a design speed of 34 knots (63 km/h; 39 mph). Three funnels were fitted. A total of 268 long tons (272 t) of oil could be carried, including 40 long tons (41 t) in peace tanks that were not used in wartime, giving a range of 2,280 nautical miles (4,220 km; 2,620 mi) at 17 knots (31 km/h; 20 mph).

Armament consisted of three single QF 4-inch (102 mm) Mk IV guns on the ship's centreline, with one on the forecastle, one aft on a raised platform and one between the middle and aft funnels. Torpedo armament consisted of two twin mounts for 21 in (533 mm) torpedoes. A single QF 2-pounder 40 mm (1.6 in) "pom-pom" anti-aircraft gun was mounted between the torpedo tubes to provide defence against aerial attack. For anti-submarine warfare, Napier was equipped with two chutes for two depth charges. The number of depth charges carried increased as the war progressed. The ship had a complement of 80 officers and ratings.

== Construction and career ==
Laid down by John Brown & Company of Clydebank at their shipyard on 6 July 1915 with the yard number 444, Napier was launched on 27 November and completed on 22 January the following year. The ship was the third to be named after Admiral Sir Charles Napier, the nineteenth century sailor, to enter naval service. The vessel was deployed as part of the Grand Fleet, joining the Twelfth Destroyer Flotilla at Scapa Flow.

Napier was undergoing refit in May 1916 and so missed the Battle of Jutland. On 5 June, the destroyer was sent out to look for survivors from the armoured cruiser Hampshire. Hampshire had been sailing to Russia without escort with the Secretary of State for War, Field Marshal Lord Kitchener, but had sunk after hitting a mine and only 13 individuals, which did not include the Secretary of State, survived. Napier found only three deserted boats, including a dinghy and a whaler. On 16 November the destroyer sailed to confront the German High Seas Fleet at the Second Battle of Heligoland Bight as part of the defensive screen for the dreadnought battleships of the First Battle Squadron, but was not called on to engage the enemy forces and returned to port without firing a shot.

On 27 January 1917, the destroyer was temporally seconded to the Harwich Force to bolster defences in the south of England. The posting did not last long and by July the vessel had returned to Scapa Flow, remaining with the Twelfth Destroyer Flotilla. Later that year, Napier was involved in escorting oilers of the Grand Fleet. During the following year, the destroyer joined the newly formed Third Destroyer Flotilla.

After the Armistice of 11 November 1918 that ended the war, the Royal Navy returned to a peacetime level of strength. Both the number of ships and personnel needed to be reduced to save money. Napier was initially placed in reserve at Devonport. However, the posting did not last long. The harsh conditions of wartime service, particularly the combination of high speed and the poor weather that is typical of the North Sea, exacerbated by the fact that the hull was not galvanised, meant that much of the hull and superstructure was well worn. The destroyer was deemed unfit to remain in operation, subsequently was decommissioned and, on 8 November 1921, was sold to Slough TC to be broken up in Germany.

== Pennant numbers ==
Pennant number	Date
G34	September 1915
GA0	June 1918
G18	January 1919
