= Second Battle of Heligoland Bight =

Naval Engagement in World War I

- Part of the First World War
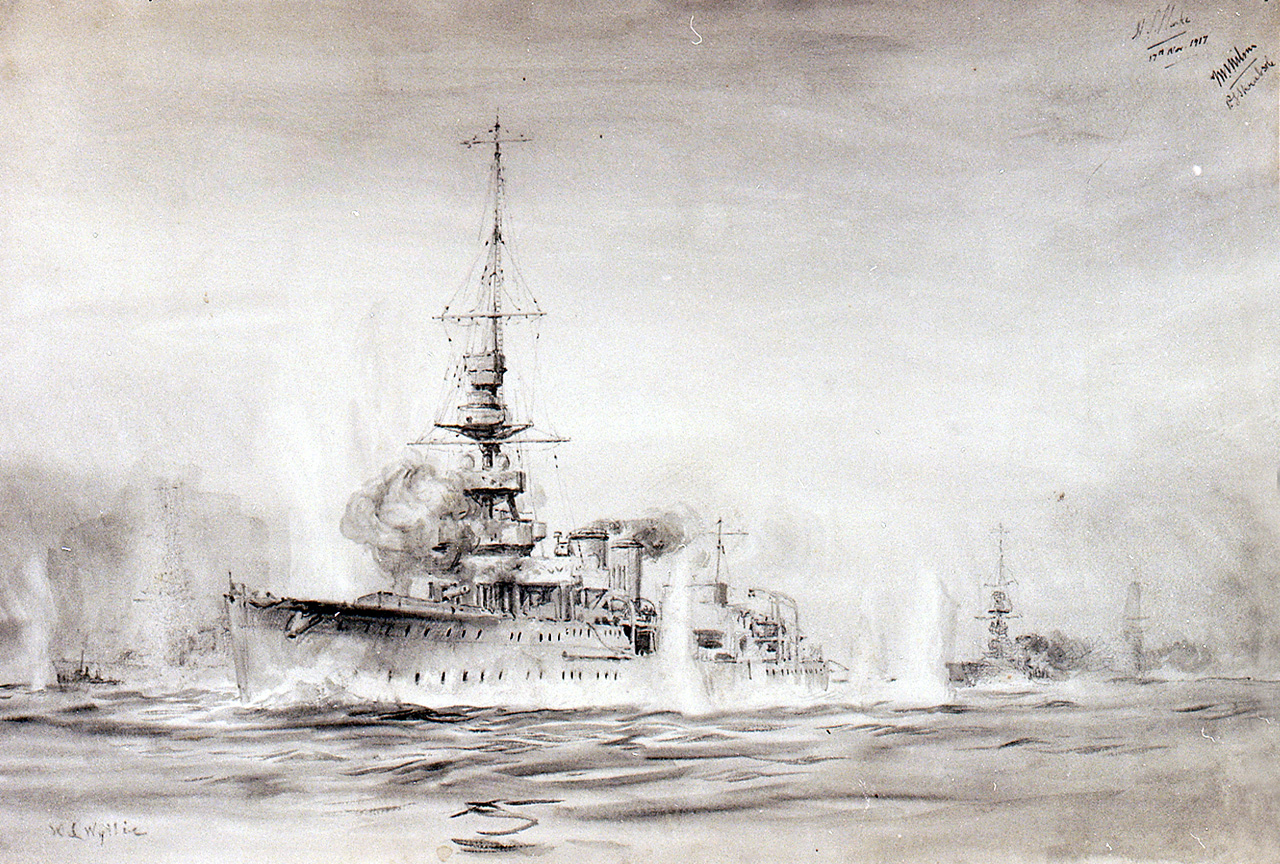
- HMS Calypso at the battle, during which she was severely damaged, drawn by William Lionel Wyllie
Date	17 November 1917
Location	Heligoland Bight, North Sea 54°10′N 8°04′E
Result	Indecisive

Belligerents
United Kingdom	German Empire

Commanders and leaders
(United Kingdom) Trevylyan Napier (United Kingdom) William Pakenham	(German Empire) Ludwig von Reuter

Strength
3 battlecruisers; 8 light cruisers; 10 destroyers	2 battleships; 4 light cruisers; 8 destroyers; 14 minesweepers

Casualties and losses
22 men killed; 43 wounded; 1 light cruiser damaged	21 men killed; 40 wounded; 22 (POW); 1 minesweeper sunk; 2 light cruisers damaged
- Location of the engagement

The Second Battle of Heligoland Bight, also the Action in the Helgoland Bight and the Zweite Seeschlacht bei Helgoland, was an inconclusive naval engagement fought between British and German squadrons on 17 November 1917 during the First World War.

== Background ==
=== British minelaying ===
The British used sea mining defensively to protect sea lanes and trade routes and offensively to impede the transit of German submarines and surface ships in the North Sea, the danger of which was illustrated on 17 October 1917 by the sortie of the German Brummer-class cruisers SMS Brummer and SMS Bremse (the action off Lerwick) against the Scandinavian Convoy. (During 1917, six U-boats were sunk by British mines and in two years, the German minesweeping counter-effort suffered the loss about 28 destroyers and 70 minesweepers and other ships.)

The Germans had been forced into minesweeping up to 150 nmi (170 mi; 280 km) into the Heligoland Bight and in the southern Baltic Sea, covered by light cruisers and destroyers, with occasional distant support by battleships. After the action off Lerwick, several proposals for attacks on the German minesweepers and escorts were canvassed at the Admiralty. On 31 October, the British sent a large force of cruisers and destroyers into the Kattegat, which sank Kronprinz Wilhelm, an armed merchant ship and nine trawlers.

=== German test trips ===
The prolific British laying of mines and net barrages outside the main German mine belts between Horns Reef and Terschelling, close to the bases of the High Seas Fleet (Hochseeflotte) forced the Kaiserliche Marine into surveying the British minefields, to find routes through them for transit into and back from the North Sea. Test trips were carried out, being substantial operations with ships to find the mines, minesweepers, torpedo boats (usually a continental term for destroyers), U-boats, barrier breakers and light cruisers, with air reconnaissance by Zeppelins and seaplanes. The test trips were also protected by battleships on routes known to be free of mines.

== Prelude ==
=== North Sea operations ===
On 20 October, the British code breakers of Room 40, part of the Naval Intelligence Division of the Admiralty, decrypted orders to the submarine UB-61 to scout to the north of Bergen to find the new route of the Scandinavian Convoy. Agent reports from Copenhagen disclosed an imminent German attack by seven light cruisers and 36 destroyers. During the week ending 11 November, British light cruisers, destroyers and a battlecruiser escort, conducted an abortive sweep along the fringe of the Heligoland Bight minefields. By mid-November the Admiralty had obtained enough intelligence to intercept one of the big German minesweeping operations, provided that the ships based at Rosyth, in Scotland, could sail in time. The Admiralty decided that an offensive operation should begin on 17 November.

=== Test trip, 17 November ===
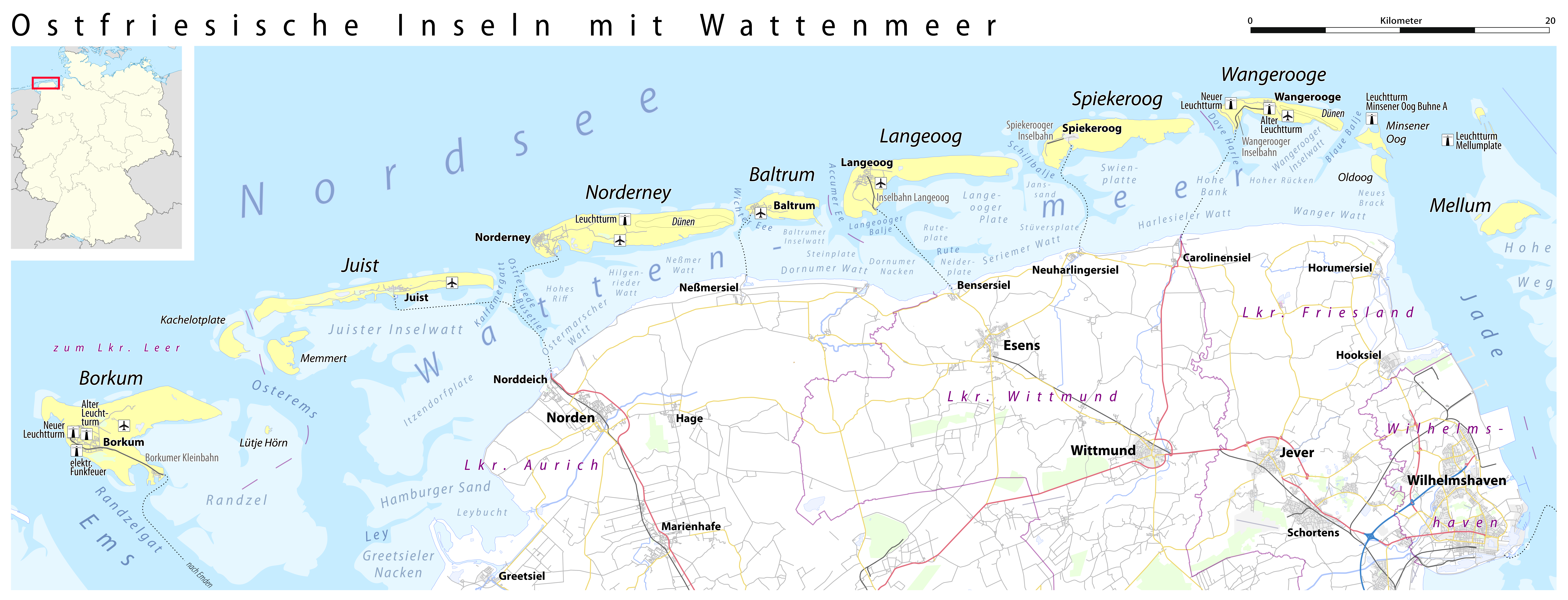
Map showing the location of Borkum in the East Frisian Islands

The Germans planned a test trip for 17 November 1917, comprising the 2nd and 6th Auxiliary Mine Sweeper Half-Flotillas, the 12th and 14th Torpedo Boat Half-Flotillas, Barrier Breaking Division IV and light cruisers of Scouting Group Division II, commanded by Rear-Admiral (Konteradmiral) Ludwig von Reuter from the 6th Mine Sweeper Half-Flotilla. The Kaiser-class battleships SMS Kaiser and SMS Kaiserin from Squadron IV, each with ten 12 in (300 mm) guns, led by Captain (Kapitän zur See) Kurt Graßhoff in Kaiserin, were to act as covering force for the group. The battleships were to reach a point west of Heligoland by 7.00 a.m. while the Test trip group rendezvoused in the Heligoland Bight about half-way between Horns Reef and Terschelling. With poor weather grounding Zeppelins and making it impossible for light cruisers to embark seaplanes after they had alighted on the sea, the Test trip relied on reconnaissance patrols by two land-based seaplanes from Borkum on the German coast just east of the Netherlands, for reconnoitring ahead of the group.

=== British plan ===
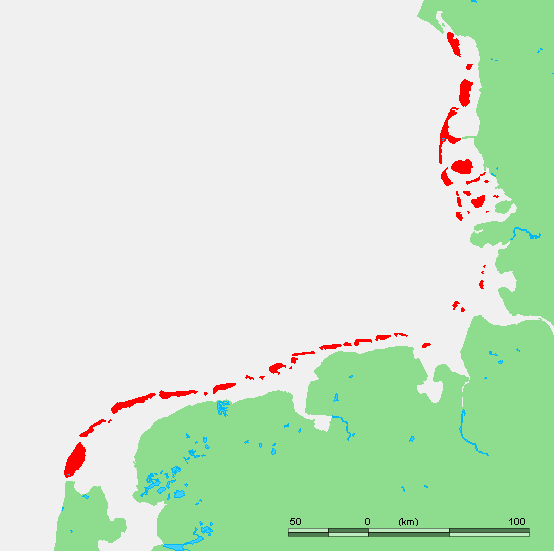
Diagram showing the Frisian Islands, including Terschelling and Borkum (bottom left) and Sylt in the North Frisian Islands (top right), both part of the Wedden Sea archipelago

The German Test trip had been revealed by the code breakers of Room 40, allowing the British to plan an ambush. On 16 November, orders for an attack on the Test trip were sent to Admiral Sir David Beatty, Commander-in-Chief of the British Grand Fleet. On 17 November 1917 a force of cruisers under Vice Admiral Trevylyan Napier was sent to attack the German minesweepers as they were minesweeping.

== Battle ==
The action began at 7:30 a.m., roughly 65 nmi (75 mi; 120 km) west of Sylt, when Courageous sighted German ships. She opened fire at 7:37 a.m. Reuter advanced with four light cruisers and eight destroyers towards the British ship to cover the withdrawal of the minesweepers, with all but the trawler Kehdingen, escaping the British detachment. (Note: Two of the German destroyers were detached but rejoined during the battle) A stern chase ensued as the German forces, making skillful use of smokescreens, withdrew south-east at their best speed, under fire from the 1st Cruiser Squadron, the 1st Light Cruiser Squadron and the 6th Light Cruiser Squadron. Repulse was detached from the 1st Battle Cruiser Squadron and came up at high speed to join the battle. Both sides were hampered in their manoeuvres by the presence of naval minefields.

At about the same time, the light cruisers came under fire from Kaiser and Kaiserin, Kaiser-class battleships, which had come up in support of Reuter's ships; Caledon was struck by a 12.0 in (30.5 cm) shell, which damaged a gun turret; shortly afterwards, the British ships gave up the chase as they reached the edge of more minefields. A shell went through the upper conning tower of the light cruiser Calypso, killing the conning tower crew and mortally wounding the Captain, Herbert Edwards, on the bridge and knocking unconscious the navigator, Lieutenant-Commander M. F. F. Wilson. All personnel on the lower bridge were killed and the gunnery officer, Lieutenant H. C. C. Clarke took command, which was made more difficult because the shell also cut all electrical communications and reduced the rate of fire. (Note: There is some dispute as to whether it was a 15 cm (5.9 in) or a 12.0 in (30.5 cm) shell which damaged Calypso; since she was hit at 9:40 a.m., before the German battleships opened fire, the former is the more likely.) Alexander-Sinclair immediately ordered his ships to turn 16 points (180°) and retire to the north-west.

The battlecruiser Repulse briefly engaged the German ships at about 10:00 a.m., achieving a hit on the light cruiser SMS Königsberg that started a serious fire. Also at 10:00 a.m., Napier received a report from Galatea of "enemy battleships, battle cruisers and light cruisers bearing south-east, steering east". Other messages suggested that the British light cruisers were not heavily engaged. At 10:40 a.m. heavy fog came down. By 01:00 p.m. the light cruisers were in touch with Napier's flag and the whole force headed back to British waters.

== Aftermath ==
=== Analysis ===
French map of the Battle of Jutland (1916) showing (in black) the approximate area of German minefields in the North Sea

In 1984, Patrick Beesly wrote that the British operation was daring but that Napier was unjustly blamed for its failure to pursue the German ships with sufficient vigour. Room 40 was well informed about the positions of German minefields and the British fields which the Germans were trying to clear. The information had been added to Room 40's naval charts but the information was denied to Napier, who made decisions based on the charts he did have. Admiralty reluctance to disclose that their information was derived from the decoding of wireless intercepts had led to the naval commander being ill-informed. The Admiralty did at least supply operational intelligence to the naval commanders, after Beatty had made an emergency request when he was at sea. Napier was informed in ninety minutes by the Admiralty that German capital ships had sailed at 8:30 a.m. and the location of German cruisers, leading to Königsberg receiving severe damage. At the least, Room 40 had prevented the British operation degenerating from fiasco to disaster.

=== Casualties ===
In 1920, Admiral Reinhard Scheer wrote that the Germans suffered casualties of 21 men killed, ten seriously wounded and thirty men slightly wounded. An Admiralty communiqué listed British casualties as one officer and 21 men killed, four officers and 39 men wounded; 22 prisoners were taken.

=== Victoria Cross ===
Able Seaman John Carless of Walsall, aboard Commodore Cowan's flagship Caledon, was awarded a posthumous Victoria Cross for his bravery in continuing to load and fire his gun despite receiving mortal shrapnel wounds that opened his abdomen.

== Orders of battle ==
=== British forces ===
The principal source for the British order of battle is Newbolt
Naval Operations volume V, pages 168–169. (Note: Additional organisational details are taken from The Admiralty (1917) Supplement to the Monthly Naval List, November 1917 (London: Harrison and Sons). Commanding officers are from The Admiralty (1917) Monthly Navy List, November 1917.)

1st Cruiser Squadron
Vice Admiral Trevylyan Napier CB, MVO

Courageous (flag; Capt Arthur Bromley)
Glorious (Capt Charles Miller CB)
Attached destroyers (13th Destroyer Flotilla)

Ursa (Cdr John Tovey)
Nerissa (Lt. Cdr. Montague Legge DSO)
Urchin (Lt Cdr Guy Bowles)
Umpire (Lt Cdr Roger Alison DSO)

6th Light Cruiser Squadron
Rear Admiral Edwyn Alexander-Sinclair CB MVO

Cardiff (flag; Capt. Claud Sinclair)
Ceres (Capt. the Hon. Herbert Meade DSO)
Calypso (Capt. Herbert Edwards †)
Caradoc (Capt. William Kerr)
Attached destroyers (13th Destroyer Flotilla)

Valentine (flotilla leader; Cdr. Charles Fremantle)
Vimiera (Cdr. Dashwood Fowler Moir)
Vanquisher (Lt Cdr. Kenneth Beattie)
Vehement (Lt. Vernon Hammersley-Heenan)

1st Light Cruiser Squadron
Commodore Walter Cowan CB, MVO, DSO

Caledon (Cdre Cowan)
Galatea (Capt. Charles Forbes DSO)
Royalist (Capt. Mathew Best MVO, DSO)
Inconstant (Capt. Francis Marten)
Attached destroyers (13th Destroyer Flotilla)

Vendetta (Cdr. Charles Ramsey)
Medway (Lt. Cdr. Charles H. Neill James)

1st Battle Cruiser Squadron (detachment)
Rear Admiral Richard Phillimore CB, MVO

Repulse (flag; Capt. William Boyle) (Note: Repulse, which was faster and of shallower draft than the other British battle cruisers, was detached to support the 1st Light Cruiser Squadron at about 8:00 a.m.; she came into action around 9:00 a.m. and achieved a 15-inch hit on Königsberg at 9:58 a.m. at the end of the engagement.)

Other forces at sea in support (none of which engaged)

Battle Cruiser Force
Vice Admiral Sir William Pakenham KCB, KCVO)

Lion (flag)
New Zealand
Princess Royal
Tiger
Attached light forces (13th Destroyer Flotilla)

Champion (flotilla cruiser),
Nepean
Obdurate
Oriana
Petard
Telemachus
Tower
Tristram
Verdun.

1st Battle Squadron
Admiral Sir Charles Madden

Revenge (flag)
Royal Oak
Resolution
Emperor of India
Benbow
Canada
Attached destroyers (12th Destroyer Flotilla)

Saumarez (flotilla leader)
Valhalla (flotilla leader)
Noble
Nonsuch
Napier
Paladin
Penn
Prince
Mischief
Munster
Narborough

=== German forces ===
2nd Scouting Group
Konteradmiral Ludwig von Reuter

Königsberg (FKpt Karl Feldmann)
Pillau (FKpt Gerhard von Gaudecker)
Frankfurt (FKpt Otto Seidensticker)
Nürnberg (KptzS Walther Hildebrand)

7th Torpedo-Boat Flotilla
KKpt Hermann Cordes (Note: German large torpedo boats (großer torpedoboote) were of similar size and function to the destroyers in the Royal Navy and are often referred to as such.) (Note: The principal source for the German order of battle is Gladisch, pp. 56–57. Commanding officers are from Gladisch, Scheer op. cit., German Wikipedia articles on the cruisers, Dave Alton, Commanding Officers of German Capital Ships 1914–19 (accessed 29 May 2013) and Ehrenrangliste der Kaiserlich-Deutschen Marine 1914–18 [1930] (Konteradmiral a. D. Albert Stoelzel).)

S62 (KptLt Max Fink; flotilla leader)
G87 (OLtzS Wolfgang Komorowski)
14th half-flotilla (KptLt Richard Beitzen)

G92 (KptLt Arthur von Killinger; half-flotilla leader)
G93 (KptLt Georg Reimer)
V83 (Kpt Lt Wedig von Keyserlingk)

12th half-flotilla (KKpt Rudolf Lahs)

V43 (OLtzS Victor Narjes; half-flotilla leader)
V44 (OLtzS Eberhard Kautter)
V45 (KptLt Martin Laßmann)

Minesweepers

6th Minesweeper Half-Flotilla [6. Minensuchhalbflottille] (KptLt d'Ottilié)

M66, M7, A36, T74, M53, M4, M3, M1

4th Auxiliary Minesweeper Half-Flotilla [4. Hilfsminensuchhalbflottille] (KptLt d R Joachim Löwe)

A63, A68, A69, A74, A41, A52

2nd Auxiliary Minesweeper Half-Flotilla (KptLt d R Klose)

fishing vessels

6th Auxiliary Minesweeper Half-Flotilla (KptLt d R Wilke)

fishing vessels

4th Barrier-Breaker Group [IV. Sperrbrechergruppe] (KptLt d R Hillebrand)

two vessels

Group S, North Sea Outpost Flotilla (LtzS Heinrich Woldag)^{NO}

armed trawlers Fritz Reuter and Kehdingen^{GE}

4th Battle Squadron (detachment)
KptzS Kurt Graßhoff

Kaiserin (KptzS Kurt Graßhoff)
Kaiser (KptzS Max Loesch)
Attached torpedo-boats (anti-submarine escort)

S18 (KptLt Wildemann)
S24 (KptLt Paschen)

Other forces at sea in support (none of which were engaged)

Battleships: Friedrich der Grosse, König Albert
Battlecruisers: Hindenburg, Moltke
