= SM UB-89 =

- UB-148 at sea, a U-boat similar to UB-89.

History

German Empire
- Name: UB-89
- Ordered: 6 / 8 February 1917
- Builder: AG Vulcan, Hamburg
- Cost: 3,654,000 German Papiermark
- Yard number: 105
- Launched: 22 December 1917
- Commissioned: 25 February 1918
- Fate: Lost 21 October 1918 in collision with SMS Frankfurt, scrapped 1920

General characteristics
- Class & type: Type UB III submarine
- Displacement: 510 t (500 long tons) surfaced; 640 t (630 long tons) submerged
- Length: 55.52 m (182 ft 2 in) (o/a)
- Beam: 5.76 m (18 ft 11 in)
- Draught: 3.73 m (12 ft 3 in)
- Propulsion: 2 × propeller shaft; 2 × MAN-Vulcan four-stroke 6-cylinder diesel engines, 1,085 bhp (809 kW); 2 × Siemens-Schuckert electric motors, 780 shp (580 kW)
- Speed: 13 knots (24 km/h; 15 mph) surfaced; 7.4 knots (13.7 km/h; 8.5 mph) submerged
- Range: 7,120 nmi (13,190 km; 8,190 mi) at 6 knots (11 km/h; 6.9 mph) surfaced; 55 nmi (102 km; 63 mi) at 4 knots (7.4 km/h; 4.6 mph) submerged
- Test depth: 50 m (160 ft)
- Complement: 3 officers, 31 men
- Armament: 5 × 50 cm (19.7 in) torpedo tubes (4 bow, 1 stern); 10 torpedoes; 1 × 10.5 cm (4.13 in) deck gun

Service record
- Part of: II Flotilla; 5 May – 11 November 1918
- Commanders: Kptlt. Walter Gude; 25 February – 11 November 1918
- Operations: 3 patrols
- Victories: 2 merchant ships sunk (373 GRT)

SM UB-89 was a German Type UB III submarine or U-boat in the German Imperial Navy (German: Kaiserliche Marine) during World War I. She was commissioned into the German Imperial Navy on 25 February 1918 as SM UB-89. (Note: "SM" stands for "Seiner Majestät" (English: His Majesty's) and combined with the U for Unterseeboot would be translated as His Majesty's Submarine.)

UB-89 was lost in a collision with the light cruiser SMS Frankfurt in Kiel. Seven crew members perished in the accident. On 30 October 1918 the boat was raised by the salvage ship SMS Cyclop. On 7 March 1919, en route to surrender, UB-89 began to drift and was towed to Ymuiden. In 1920, the boat was broken up in Dortrecht

== Construction ==
He was built by AG Vulcan of Hamburg and following just under a year of construction, launched at Hamburg on 22 December 1917. UB-89 was commissioned early the next year under the command of Kptlt. Walter Gude. Like all Type UB III submarines, UB-89 carried 10 torpedoes and was armed with a 10.5 cm (4.13 in) deck gun. UB-89 would carry a crew of up to 3 officer and 31 men and had a cruising range of 7,120 nautical miles (13,190 km; 8,190 mi). UB-89 had a displacement of 510 t (500 long tons) while surfaced and 640 t (630 long tons) when submerged. Her engines enabled her to travel at 13 knots (24 km/h; 15 mph) when surfaced and 7.4 knots (13.7 km/h; 8.5 mph) when submerged.

== Service history ==
=== Summary of raiding history ===
Date	Name	Nationality	Tonnage (Note: Tonnages are in gross register tons)	Fate
25 July 1918	Asta	Denmark	121	Sunk
9 August 1918	Emma	Russian Empire	252	Sunk

== Bibliography ==
- Bendert, Harald (2000). Die UB-Boote der Kaiserlichen Marine, 1914-1918. Einsätze, Erfolge, Schicksal (in German). Hamburg: Verlag E.S. Mittler & Sohn GmbH. ISBN 3-8132-0713-7.
- Gröner, Erich; Jung, Dieter; Maass, Martin (1991). U-boats and Mine Warfare Vessels. German Warships 1815–1945. Vol. 2. Translated by Thomas, Keith; Magowan, Rachel. London: Conway Maritime Press. ISBN 0-85177-593-4.
- Rössler, Eberhard (1979). Die deutschen U-Boote und ihre Werften: eine Bilddokumentation über den deutschen U-Bootbau; in zwei Bänden (in German). Vol. I. Munich: Bernard & Graefe. ISBN 3-7637-5213-7.
