= SMS Frankfurt =

Light cruiser of the German Imperial Navy

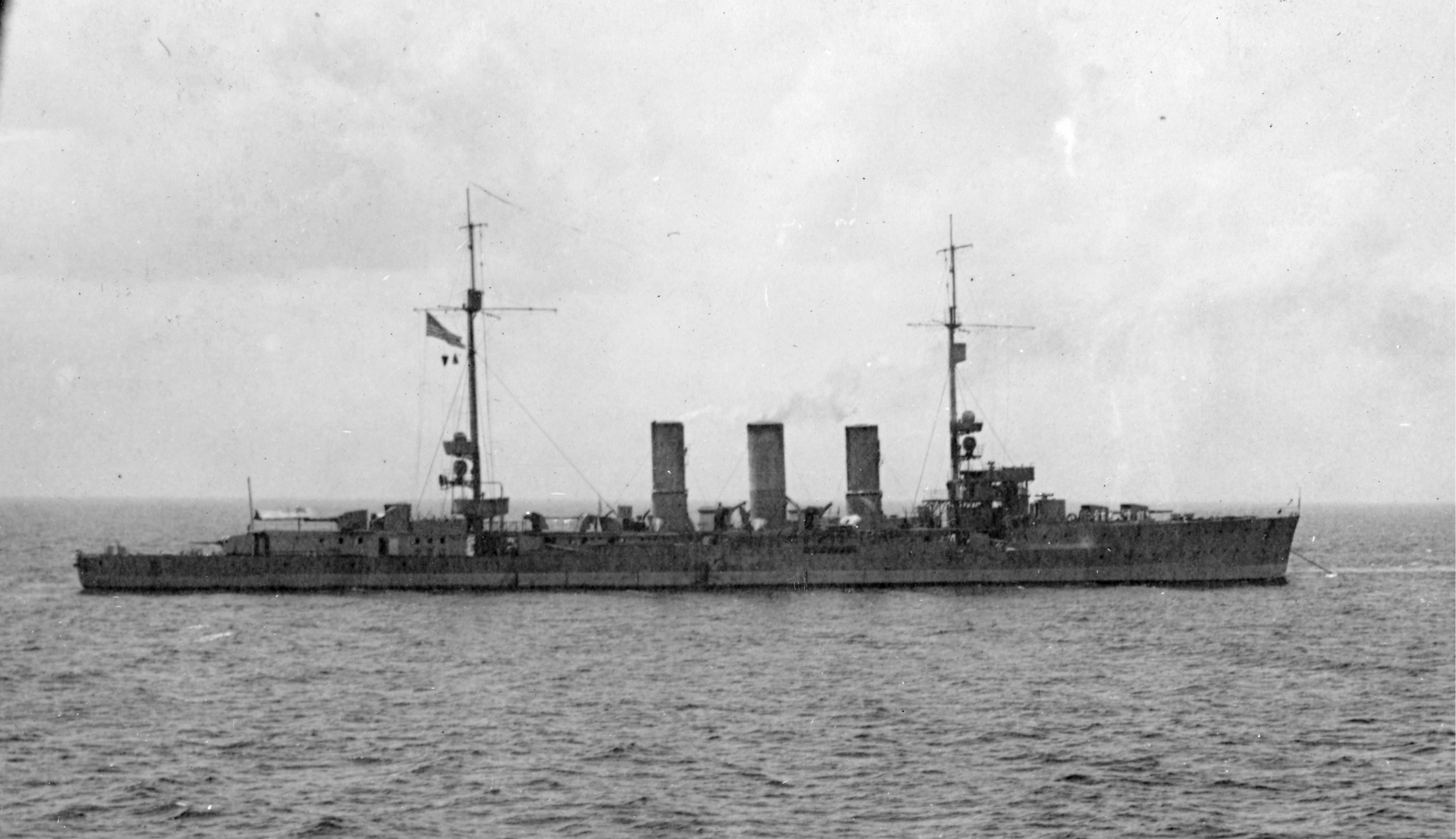
- SMS Frankfurt as a target ship

History

German Empire
- Name: Frankfurt
- Namesake: Frankfurt
- Builder: Kaiserliche Werft, Kiel
- Laid down: 1913
- Launched: 20 March 1915
- Commissioned: 20 August 1915
- Fate: Ceded to the United States after World War I

History

United States
- Name: USS Frankfurt
- Acquired: 11 March 1920
- Commissioned: 4 June 1920
- Fate: Sunk as a target, 18 July 1921

General characteristics
- Class & type: Wiesbaden-class cruiser
- Displacement: Normal: 5,180 t (5,100 long tons; 5,710 short tons); Full load: 6,601 t (6,497 long tons; 7,276 short tons)
- Length: 145.3 m (477 ft)
- Beam: 13.9 m (46 ft)
- Draft: 5.76 m (18.9 ft)
- Installed power: 12 × water-tube boilers; 31,000 shp (23,000 kW)
- Propulsion: 2 × steam turbines; 2 × screw propellers
- Speed: 27.5 knots (50.9 km/h)
- Range: 4,800 nmi (8,900 km; 5,500 mi) at 12 kn (22 km/h; 14 mph)
- Crew: 17 officers; 457 enlisted
- Armament: 8 × 15 cm (5.9 in) SK L/45 guns; 2 × 8.8 cm (3.5 in) SK L/45 guns; 4 × 50 cm (19.7 in) torpedo tubes; 120 mines
- Armor: Belt: 60 mm (2.4 in); Deck: 60 mm; Conning tower: 100 mm (3.9 in)

SMS Frankfurt was a light cruiser of the Wiesbaden class built by the German Kaiserliche Marine (Imperial Navy). She had one sister ship, SMS Wiesbaden; the ships were very similar to the previous Karlsruhe-class cruisers. The ship was laid down in 1913, launched in March 1915, and completed by August 1915. Armed with eight 15 cm SK L/45 guns, Frankfurt had a top speed of 27.5 knots (50.9 km/h; 31.6 mph) and displaced 6,601 t (6,497 long tons; 7,276 short tons) at full load.

Frankfurt saw extensive action with the High Seas Fleet during World War I. She served primarily in the North Sea, and participated in the Bombardment of Yarmouth and Lowestoft and the battles of Jutland and Second Heligoland. At Jutland, she was lightly damaged by a British cruiser and her crew suffered minor casualties. At the end of the war, she was interned with the bulk of the German fleet in Scapa Flow. When the fleet was scuttled in June 1919, Frankfurt was one of the few ships that were not successfully sunk. She was ceded to the US Navy as a war prize and ultimately expended as a bomb target in tests conducted by the US Navy and Army Air Force in July 1921.

== Design ==
The Wiesbaden-class cruisers were a development of the preceding Graudenz-class cruisers, but the budgetary constraints imposed by the need to pass the 1912 Naval Law no longer applied. This freed the design staff to adopt the new 15 cm (5.9 in) gun for the new ship's main battery, which the German fleet had sought for some time. The decision to move to the larger gun was in large part driven by reports that the latest British cruiser, HMS Chatham, would carry a complete waterline armor belt.

Frankfurt was 145.3 meters (477 ft) long overall and had a beam of 13.9 m (46 ft) and a draft of 5.76 m (18.9 ft) forward. She displaced 6,601 t (6,497 long tons; 7,276 short tons) at full load. The ship had a fairly small superstructure that consisted primarily of a conning tower forward. She was fitted with a pair of pole masts, the fore just aft of the conning tower and the mainmast further aft. Her hull had a long forecastle that extended for the first third of the ship, stepping down to main deck level just aft of the conning tower, before reducing a deck further at the mainmast for a short quarterdeck. Frankfurt had a crew of 17 officers and 457 enlisted men.

Her propulsion system consisted of two sets of Marine steam turbines driving two 3.5-meter (11 ft) screw propellers. Steam was provided by ten coal-fired Marine-type water-tube boilers and two oil-fired double-ended boilers, which were vented through three funnels. The ship's engines were rated to produce 31,000 shaft horsepower (23,000 kW), which gave the ship a top speed of 27.5 knots (50.9 km/h; 31.6 mph). Frankfurt carried 1,280 t (1,260 long tons) of coal, and an additional 470 t (460 long tons) of oil that gave her a range of 4,800 nautical miles (8,900 km; 5,500 mi) at 12 knots (22 km/h; 14 mph).

The ship was armed with a main battery of eight 15 cm (5.9 in) SK L/45 guns in single pedestal mounts. Two were placed side by side forward on the forecastle, four were located amidships, two on either side, and two were placed in a superfiring pair aft. The guns could engage targets out to 17,600 m (57,700 ft). They were supplied with 1,024 rounds of ammunition, for 128 shells per gun. The ship's antiaircraft armament initially consisted of four 5.2 cm (2 in) L/55 guns, though these were replaced with a pair of 8.8 cm (3.5 in) SK L/45 anti-aircraft guns. She was also equipped with four 50 cm (19.7 in) torpedo tubes with eight torpedoes. Two were submerged in the hull on the broadside and two were mounted on the deck amidships. She could also carry 120 mines.

The ship was protected by a waterline armor belt that was 60 mm (2.4 in) thick amidships. Protection for the ship's internals was reinforced with a curved armor deck that was 60 mm thick; the deck sloped downward at the sides and connected to the bottom edge of the belt armor. The conning tower had 100 mm (3.9 in) thick sides.

== Service history ==
Frankfurt was ordered on 19 May 1913 under the contract name "Ersatz Hela", (Note: German warships were ordered under provisional names. Additions to the fleet were given a single letter; ships intended to replace older or lost vessels were ordered as "Ersatz (name of the ship to be replaced)".) and was laid down at the Kaiserliche Werft shipyard in Kiel on 1 December 1913. Work on the ship was delayed by the outbreak of World War I in July 1914, and she was launched on 20 March 1915, after which fitting-out work commenced. She was commissioned into active service to begin sea trials on 20 August 1915, which lasted until 12 October. She then joined II Scouting Group, part of the reconnaissance force of the High Seas Fleet. The unit was commanded by Konteradmiral (KAdm—Rear Admiral) Friedrich Boedicker. Frankfurt then conducted individual training to prepare her crew for combat operations, and then she joined the rest of the group for unit training from 22 November to 3 December. The ships of II Scouting Group moved to the North Sea on 4 December, and then embarked on a sweep through the Skagerrak and Kattegat from 16 to 18 December to search for enemy merchant shipping.

=== 1916 ===
The winter months passed uneventfully, and in March 1916, Frankfurt began the normal wartime operations for II Scouting Group: patrols in the southern North Sea to defend the German coast and sweeps for British warships. During one such sweep on 21–22 April, Frankfurt was attacked by a British submarine off the Vyl lightship, though its torpedo missed. The first operation in which Frankfurt saw action was the Bombardment of Yarmouth and Lowestoft on 24 April 1916. Frankfurt was assigned to the reconnaissance screen for the battlecruisers of I Scouting Group, temporarily under Boedicker's command. During the raid, Frankfurt attacked and sank a British armed patrol boat off the English coast. The Germans then spotted the approach of the British Harwich Force, a squadron of three light cruisers and eighteen destroyers, approaching from the south at 04:50. Boedicker initially ordered his battlecruisers to continue with the bombardment, while Frankfurt and the other five light cruisers concentrated to engage the Harwich Force. At around 05:30, the British and German light forces clashed, firing mostly at long range. The battlecruisers arrived on the scene at 05:47, prompting the British squadron to retreat at high speed. A light cruiser and destroyer were damaged before Boedicker broke off the engagement after receiving reports of submarines in the area.

==== Battle of Jutland ====
Maps showing the maneuvers of the British (blue) and German (red) fleets on 30–31 May 1916

On 24 May, Boedicker temporarily transferred his flag to Frankfurt, and he remained aboard during the fleet operation that began on 31 May and resulted in the Battle of Jutland. II Scouting Group was again screening for the I Scouting Group battlecruisers, again commanded by Vizeadmiral (Vice Admiral) Franz von Hipper. Frankfurt steamed in the leading position of the wedge-shaped formation at the head of the German line of battle at the start of the action. Frankfurt was engaged in the first action of the battle, when the cruiser screens of the German and British battlecruiser squadrons encountered each other. Frankfurt, Pillau, and Elbing briefly fired on the British light cruisers at 16:17 until the British ships turned away. Half an hour later, the fast battleships of the 5th Battle Squadron had reached the scene and opened fire on Frankfurt and the other German cruisers, though the ships quickly fled under a smokescreen and were not hit.

Shortly before 18:00, the British destroyers Onslow and Moresby attempted to attack the German battlecruisers. Heavy fire from Frankfurt and Pillau forced the British ships to break off the attack. At around 18:30, Frankfurt and the rest of II Scouting Group encountered the cruiser HMS Chester; they opened fire and scored several hits on the ship. Rear Admiral Horace Hood's three battlecruisers intervened, however, and scored a hit on Wiesbaden that disabled the ship. About an hour later, Canterbury scored four hits on Frankfurt in quick succession: two 6-inch (152 mm) hits in the area of Frankfurt's mainmast and a pair of 4-inch (102 mm) hits. One of the 4-inch shells hit forward, well above the waterline, and the second exploded in the water near the stern and damaged both screws.

Frankfurt and Pillau spotted the cruiser Castor and several destroyers shortly before 23:00. They each fired a torpedo at the British cruiser before turning back toward the German line without using their searchlights or guns to avoid drawing the British toward the German battleships. Almost two hours later, Frankfurt encountered a pair of British destroyers and fired on them briefly until they retreated at full speed. By 04:00 on 1 June, the German fleet had evaded the British fleet and reached Horns Reef. Frankfurt had three men killed and eighteen wounded in the course of the engagement, but the ship itself was not seriously damaged in the fighting. She had fired 379 rounds of 15 cm ammunition and a pair of 8.8 cm shells, and launched a single torpedo.

==== Subsequent operations ====
On 2 June, Boedicker transferred back to his previous flagship, the cruiser Graudenz. Two days later, Frankfurt was docked in Kiel for a planned shipyard period that included modifications to her main battery and the installation of a larger charthouse suitable for an admiral's staff. This work lasted until 7 July; two days later, she returned to the North Sea and rejoined her unit. II Scouting Group carried out unit training in the Baltic from 5 to 14 August, before returning to the North Sea. On 16 August, Kommodore (Commodore) Andreas Michelsen, the Leader of Torpedo-boats, transferred his flag to Frankfurt, for a major fleet raid on the British coast on 18–19 August. The raid resulted in the action of 19 August 1916, an inconclusive clash that left several ships on both sides damaged or sunk by submarines, but no direct fleet encounter.

Frankfurt next sortied on 23 September, leading II and V Torpedo-boat Flotillas on a sweep to the south of the Dogger Bank that concluded the following day without having located any British warships. Michelsen thereafter transferred his flag to Graudenz. On 25–26 September, Frankfurt joined the cruiser Regensburg for a patrol in the direction of the Maas Lightvessel. The ship participated in another major fleet operation on 18–20 October. The operation led to a brief action on 19 October, during which a British submarine torpedoed the cruiser München. The failure of the operation (coupled with the action of 19 August) convinced the German naval command to abandon its aggressive fleet strategy. In early November, the U-boat U-20 ran aground on the western coast of Denmark. On 4 November, elements of the High Seas Fleet, including Frankfurt, sortied to rescue the boat's crew. The ships returned to port the following day.

=== 1917 ===
The ship's activities through the first half of 1917 were largely restricted to local defensive patrols in the German Bight, and she saw no action during this period. These operations were interrupted by training exercises in the Baltic from 22 February to 4 March and from 20 May to 28 May. Frankfurt was then dry-docked at the Kaiserlich Werft (Imperial Shipard) in Wilhelmshaven for periodic maintenance that lasted from 29 May to 18 June. Frankfurt and the cruiser Karlsruhe were on patrol as the covering force for a group of minesweepers in the North Sea on 16 August, when the minesweepers came under attack from British light forces. Frankfurt's captain, who commanded the covering force, failed to come to the minesweepers' aid, which led to his replacement. Another period of training exercises in the Baltic followed from 3 to 22 September.

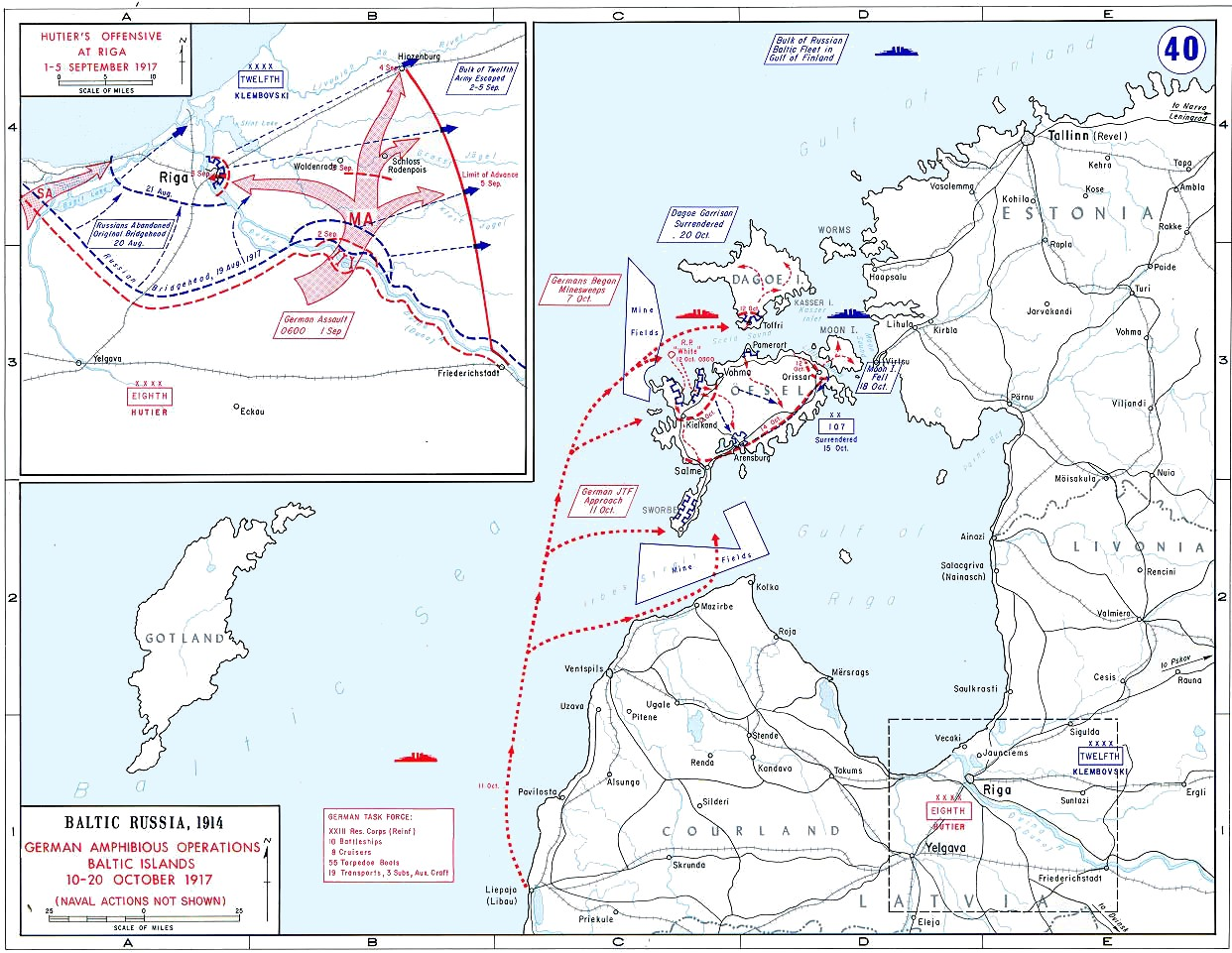
Operations of the German Navy and Army during Operation Albion

The ship participated in Operation Albion in October 1917, the amphibious assault on the islands in the Gulf of Riga after the German Army captured the city during the Battle of Riga the month before. In addition, the German fleet sought to eliminate the Russian naval forces in the Gulf of Riga that still threatened German forces in the city. Planning for the operation had begun in September, immediately following the conquest of Riga by the German The Admiralstab (the Navy High Command) planned the operation to seize the Baltic island of Ösel, and specifically the Russian gun batteries on the Sworbe Peninsula. The naval component consisted of the dreadnought battleships III and IV Battle Squadrons, nine light cruisers, three torpedo boat flotillas, and dozens of mine warfare ships; the entire force numbered some 300 ships, supported by over 100 aircraft and six zeppelins. The invasion force amounted to approximately 24,600 officers and enlisted men. By that time, II Scouting Group had come under the command of KAdm Ludwig von Reuter.

The operation began on the morning of 12 October, when the capital ships of the German force engaged Russian positions in Tagga Bay and Russian gun batteries on the Sworbe Peninsula on Saaremaa. On 18–19 October, Frankfurt and the rest of II Scouting Group covered minesweepers operating off the island of Dagö, but due to insufficient minesweepers and bad weather, the operation was postponed. By 20 October, the islands were under German control and the Russian naval forces had either been destroyed or forced to withdraw. The Admiralstab ordered the naval component to return to the North Sea. On 22 October, before she departed for the North Sea, Frankfurt embarked General der Infanterie (General of the Infantry) Oskar von Hutier, who had commanded 8th Army, and was the overall commander of German forces during Operation Albion. She transported him from Libau to Arensburg on the island of Ösel, and then back to Libau. She was then detached to return to the North Sea, where on 31 October, she resumed her previous patrol duties.

The following month, Frankfurt joined a major sweep outside of the German Bight led by the dreadnought König Albert from 2 to 3 November. The ships of II Scouting Group next went to sea on 16 November to cover minesweepers in the German Bight. The operation resulted in the Second Battle of Heligoland Bight, when heavy British forces attacked the German ships. Along with three other cruisers from II Scouting Group, Frankfurt escorted minesweepers clearing paths in minefields laid by the British. The dreadnoughts Kaiser and Kaiserin stood by in distant support. During the battle, Frankfurt came under fire from the British ships and after the Germans closed the range, she returned fire when visibility conditions permitted. She also fired torpedoes at the attacking British cruisers, but failed to score any hits. Toward the end of the engagement, the British cruiser HMS Calypso was hit by a shell that inflicted significant damage on the bridge; the shell probably came from Frankfurt or Pillau The British broke off the attack after the Germans fled far enough into their own mined waters as to make further pursuit hazardous. In the course of the action, Frankfurt was hit several times by British shells; six of her crew were killed and eighteen were wounded. One of the shell hits disabled one of her guns and her aft rangefinder. The ship thereafter sailed to Kiel for repairs at the Kaiserliche Werft there. Work was completed by mid-December, and she arrived back in the North Sea on the 17th.

=== 1918 ===
On 21 January 1918, Frankfurt and the rest of II Scouting Group returned to the Baltic for another training period that lasted until 10 February. On 10 March, Frankfurt sortied in company with the cruisers Emden, Graudenz, and Bremse and three torpedo-boat flotillas for a sweep through the Skagerrak and Kattegat to search for British merchant shipping to Scandinavia. The operation ended three days later. On 23–24 April, the ship participated in an abortive fleet operation to attack British convoys to Norway. I Scouting Group and II Scouting Group, along with the Second Torpedo-Boat Flotilla were to attack a heavily guarded British convoy to Norway, with the rest of the High Seas Fleet steaming in support. The Germans failed to locate the convoy, which had in fact sailed the day before the fleet left port. As a result, the Germans broke off the operation and returned to port.

Frankfurt was involved in laying a defensive minefield in the North Sea from 10 to 13 May. On 11 July, she went to sea to rescue survivors from a wrecked torpedo boat from the 13th Torpedo Half-Flotilla. The ships of II Scouting Group sortied on 19 July in response to the Tondern raid. The attempt to intercept the British aircraft carrier failed and the Germans returned to port. Frankfurt participated in another training period in the Baltic from 23 July to 5 August, thereafter returning briefly to the North Sea from the 6th through 12 August. That day, she was assigned to IV Scouting Group to replace the cruiser Brummer. She moved back to the Baltic to join the unit, which was assigned to the planned Operation Schlußstein. The cruiser briefly became the flagship of Kommodore Johannes von Karpf on 16 August, but already the following day, Frankfurt was replaced by the cruiser Regensburg. The former was transferred back to the North Sea, where she relieved Graudenz as the flagship of the fleet's deputy commander of torpedo-boat flotillas. Another period of training exercises took place from 27 August to 5 September.

While on patrol duty in the German Bight on 30 September, Frankfurt damaged one of her propellers, which required repairs at the Kaiserliche Werft in Wilhelmshaven that began that day and lasted until 8 October. During this period, the cruiser Pillau filled her role. After returning to service, Frankfurt joined another set of training maneuvers in the Baltic on 13 October. During these exercises on 21 October, she accidentally rammed the U-boat UB-89 in Kiel-Holtenau. Frankfurt's crew pulled three officers and twenty-five sailors from the water, but another seven men were killed in the accident. UB-89 was raised by the salvage tug Cyclop on 30 October but with the war almost over, she was not repaired and did not see further service. In the meantime, Frankfurt returned to the North Sea on 26 October.

In the final weeks of the war, Scheer and Hipper intended to inflict as much damage as possible on the British navy, in order to secure a better bargaining position for Germany, whatever the cost to the fleet. On 28 October, Frankfurt sailed to Cuxhaven to take on a load of mines for the planned operation. On the morning of 29 October 1918, the order was given to sail from Wilhelmshaven the following day. Starting on the night of 29 October, sailors on Thüringen and then on several other battleships mutinied. The unrest ultimately forced Hipper and Scheer to cancel the operation. After the armistice that ended the fighting on 11 November, the Allied powers demanded that the bulk of the High Seas Fleet be interned under Allied supervision; Frankfurt was among the vessels required to be interned. The German ships were escorted by the Grand Fleet and vessels from the other Allied countries to internment at the British naval base in Scapa Flow. The German fleet was commanded by Reuter.

=== Fate ===
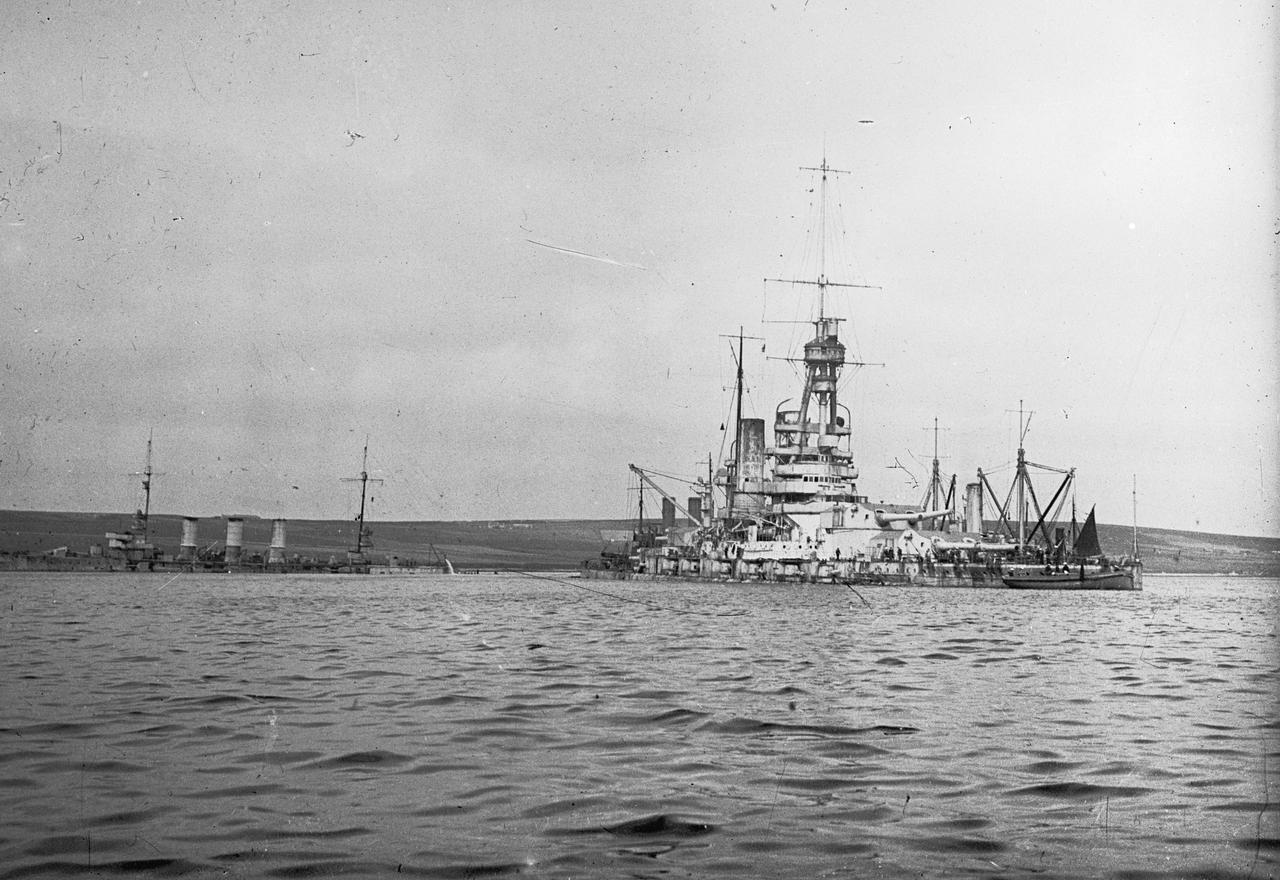
Frankfurt (left) aground in Scapa Flow; salvage work in progress on the battleship Baden (right)

The fleet remained in captivity during the negotiations that ultimately produced the Versailles Treaty. Reuter believed that the British intended to seize the German ships on 21 June 1919, which was the deadline for Germany to have signed the peace treaty. Unaware that the deadline had been extended to the 23rd, Reuter ordered the ships to be sunk at the next opportunity. On the morning of 21 June, the British fleet left Scapa Flow to conduct training maneuvers, and at 11:20 Reuter transmitted the order to scuttle his ships. British sailors boarded Frankfurt and beached her before she could sink. She was raised on 12 July, and remained in Scapa Flow while negotiations as to her final disposition (and those of other surviving German warships) were settled. On 17 January 1920, the Allied powers agreed on a final list of war prizes, and Frankfurt was allocated to the United States as a propaganda and testing ship.

She was formally taken over on 11 March 1920 in England and commissioned into the US Navy on 4 June. As she had been damaged in the scuttling, she was taken under tow by the minesweepers Redwing, Rail, and Falcon and taken to Brest, France, where the ex-German battleship SMS Ostfriesland, which had also been ceded to the United States, took Frankfurt under tow. The three minesweepers then towed three ex-German torpedo boats in company with Ostfriesland and Frankfurt; the convoy then crossed the Atlantic to the New York Navy Yard. There, the ships were thoroughly inspected by naval engineers to determine the advantages and disadvantages of the German ships, with the goal of incorporating any lessons learned into future American designs. While there, she also had her watertight compartments completely sealed to improve her ability to remain afloat when damaged.

In July 1921, the Army Air Service and the US Navy conducted a series of bombing tests off Cape Henry, Virginia, led by General Billy Mitchell. The targets included demobilized American and former German warships, including the old battleship Iowa, Frankfurt, and Ostfriesland. Frankfurt was scheduled for tests conducted on 18 July. The attacks started with small 250-pound (110 kg) and 300 lb (140 kg) bombs, which caused minor hull damage. The bombers then changed over to larger 550 lb (250 kg) and 600 lb (270 kg) bombs; Army Air Service Martin MB-2 bombers hit Frankfurt with several of the 600 lb bombs and sank the ship at 18:25.

Sinking off the Virginia Capes
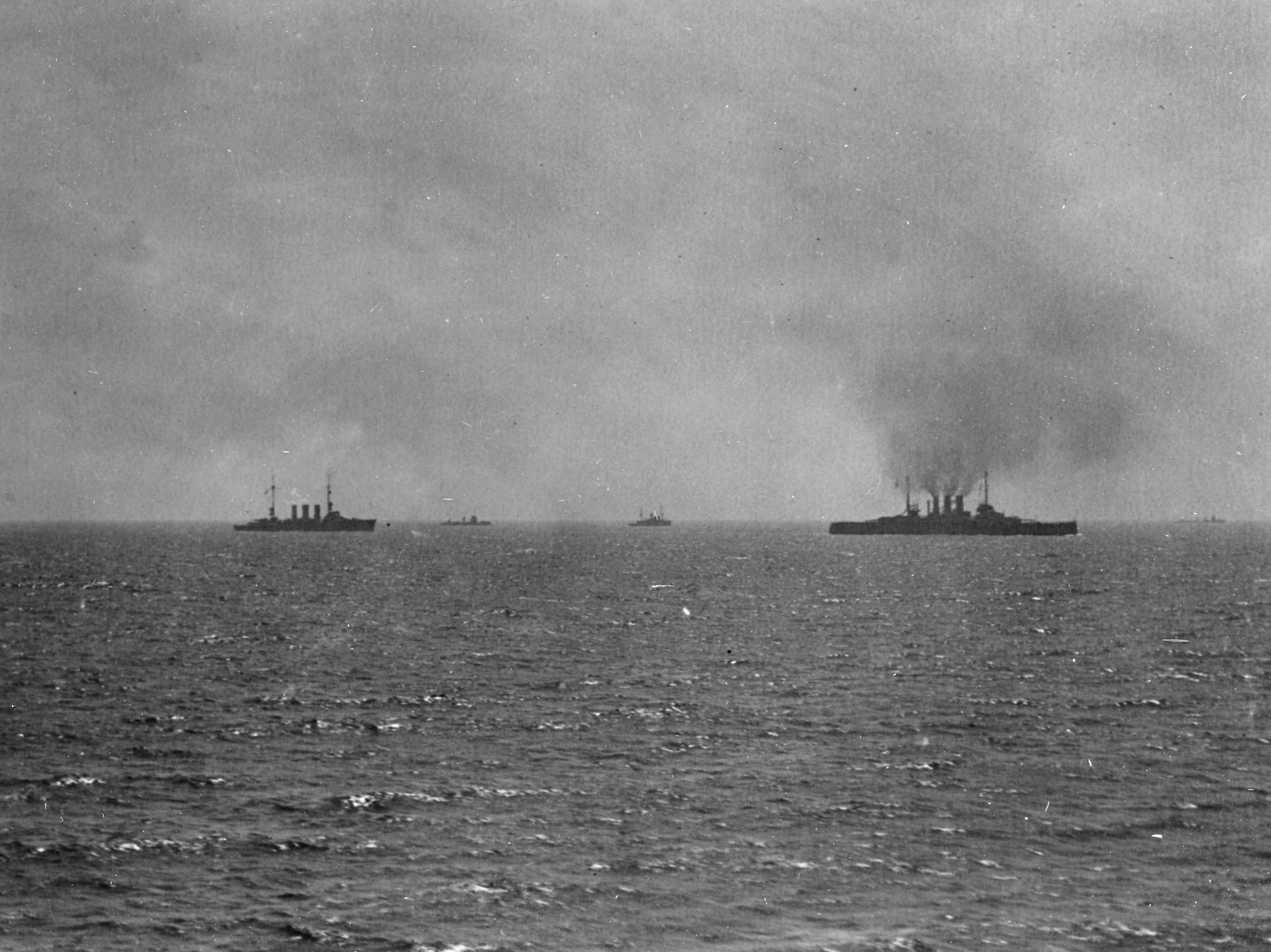
Ostfriesland, Frankfurt, and other captured German ships off the Virginia Capes, July 1921

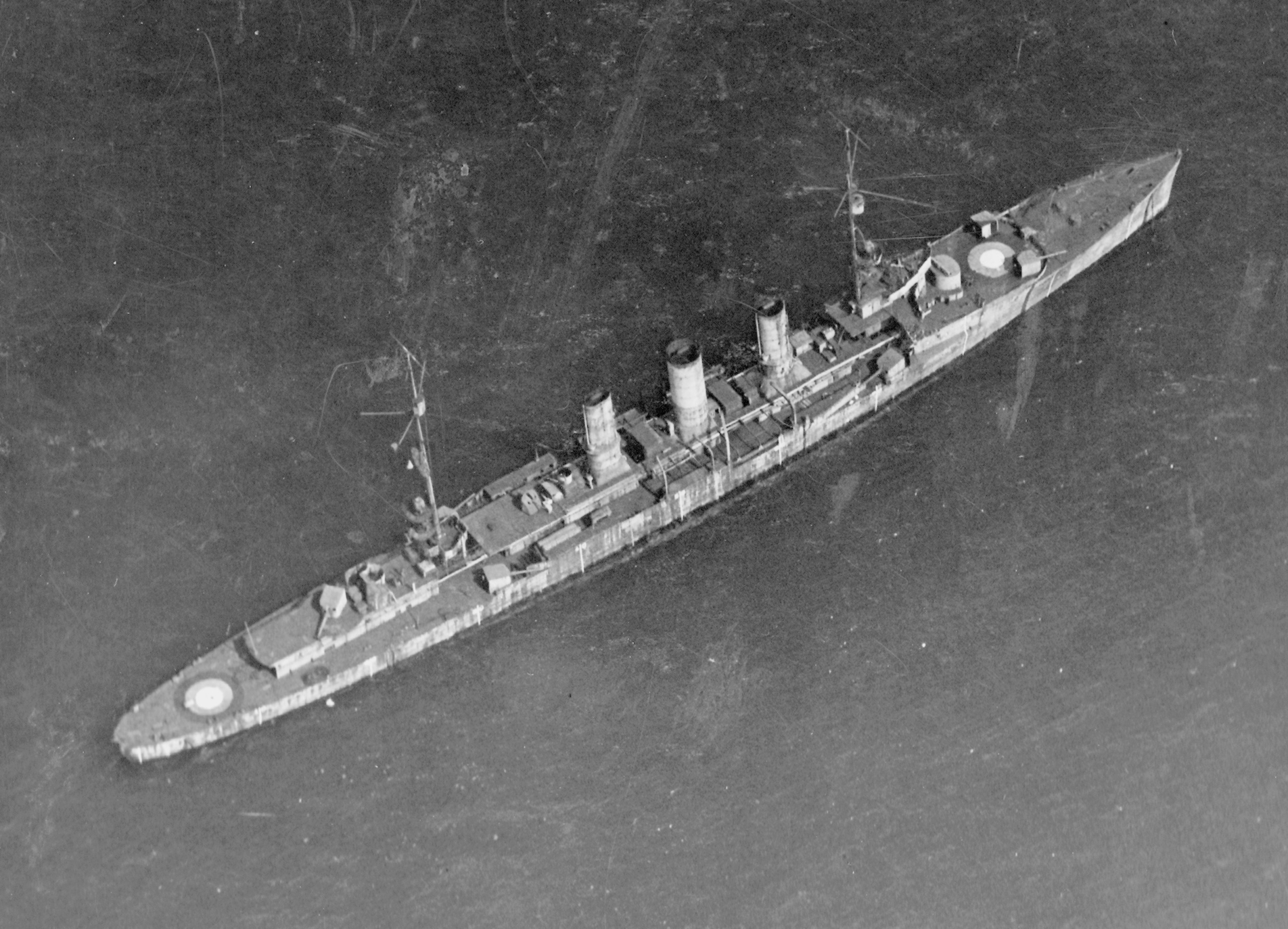
Aerial photo of Frankfurt moored during the test, with white targets painted on her deck

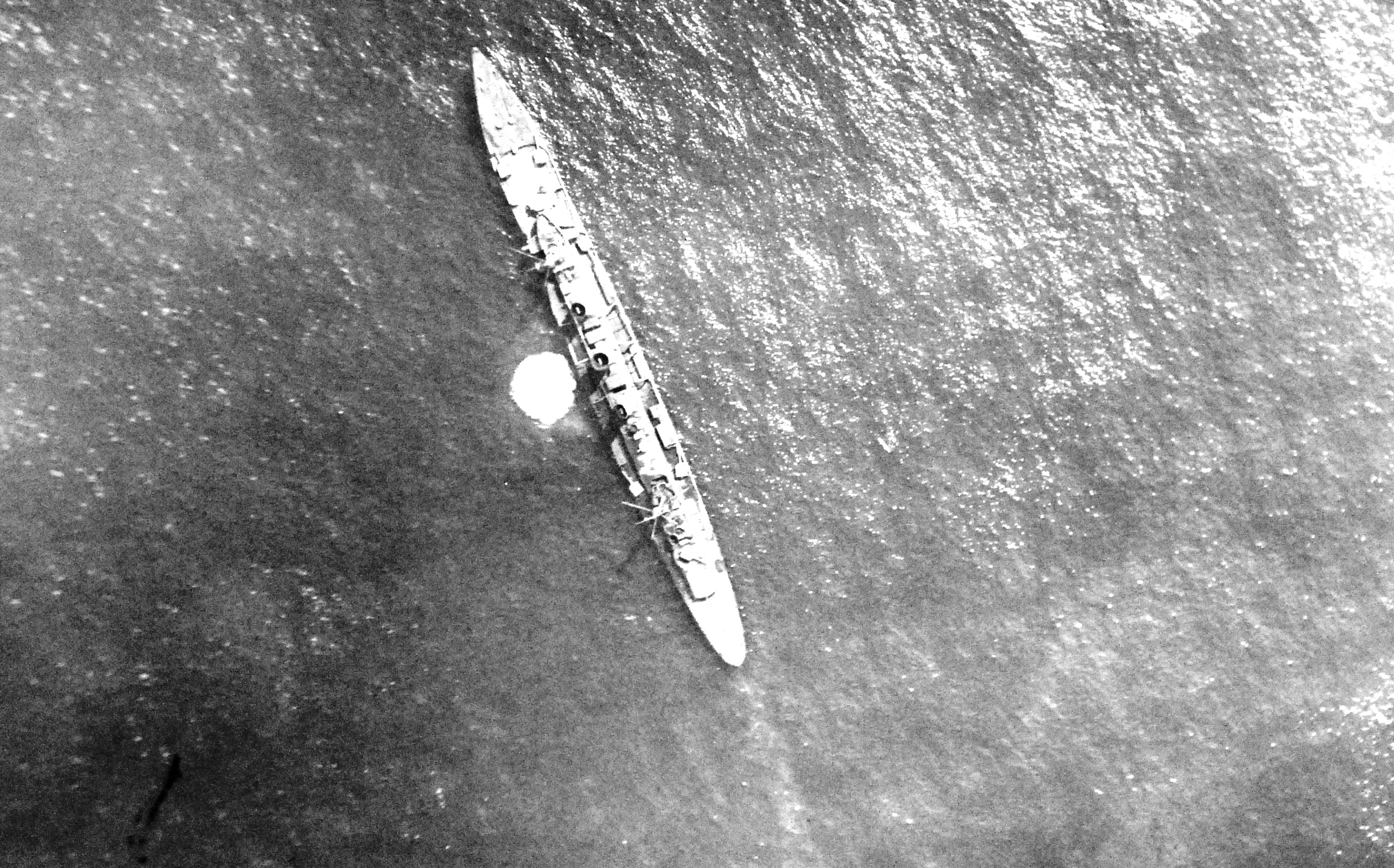
Beginning of bombing by a U.S. Navy Felixstowe F.5 photographed by the airship Roma

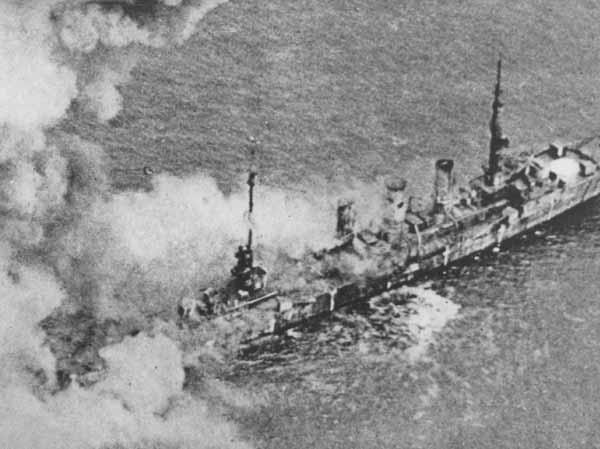
Frankfurt burning during bombing tests

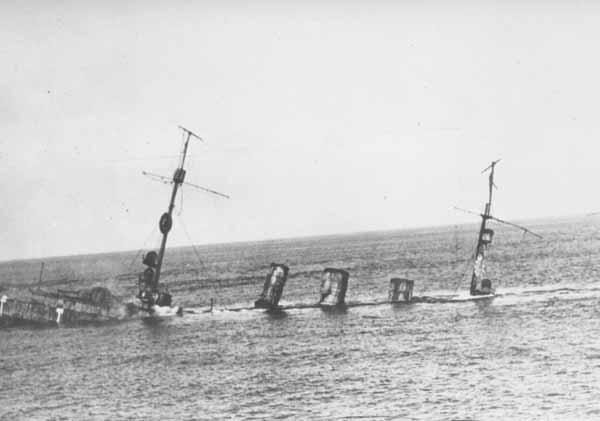
Frankfurt sinks
