= Andreas Michelsen =

German admiral (1869–1932)

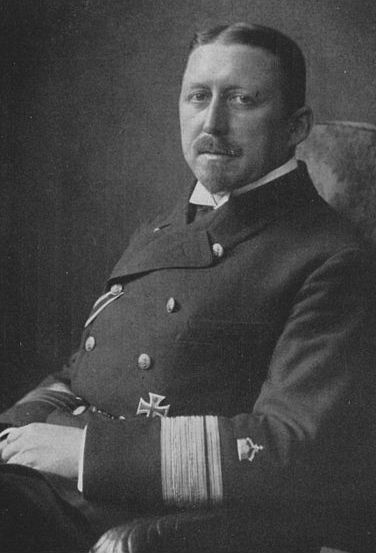
- Born: 19 February 1869; Hildesheim, Hanover, Prussia, North Germany
- Died: 8 April 1932 (aged 63); Fallingbostel, Hanover, Prussia, Germany
- Spouse: Christine Jensen
- Military career
- Allegiance: German Empire; Weimar Republic
- Branch: Imperial German Navy; Reichsmarine
- Service years: 1888 – 1920
- Rank: Vizeadmiral
- Conflicts: World War I: Operations in the North Sea: 1914–1918; Battle of Jutland; Battle of Dover Strait
- Awards: Pour le Mérite

Andreas Heinrich Michelsen (19 February 1869 – 8 April 1932) was a German Vizeadmiral and military commander. During World War I, he commanded several torpedo boats and the submarine fleet, participated in the Battle of Jutland, as well as being the leading German commander during the Battle of Dover Strait.

== Early military career ==
Andreas Michelsen was born on 19 February 1869 in Hildesheim to Eduard Michelsen and Agnes Michelsen (née Kisker). He joined the Imperial German Navy as a cadet in April 1888. He was promoted to lieutenant in April 1894, to corvette captain in March 1906, and promoted to frigate captain in May 1910. In 1903, Michelsen served as an adjutant under Hans von Koester and in 1905, he commanded the SMS Grille. For a while he also worked as a lecturer at the Maritime Academy. From October 1910, he served as Commander of the Torpedo Command, which he held until September 1911. In January 1911, he was promoted to the rank of Battleship Captain, and was appointed Deputy Commander of the armored cruiser Friedrich Carl.

== World War I ==
At the beginning of World War I, Michelsen was appointed commander of the armored cruiser SMS Prinz Adalbert. In addition to that command, from 20 April to 3 July 1915 he also held the position of Chief of Staff of the Scout Forces in the Eastern Baltic. In July 1915, the SMS Prinz Adalbert was severely damaged thanks to a torpedo attack, and Michelsen managed to tow it back to Kiel, running 240 nautical miles backward. In August 1915, he was appointed Chief of Staff of the Supreme Command in the Eastern Baltic, and on 14 April 1916 he became Commander-in-Chief of the Torpedo Boats (Erster Führer der Torpedobootsstreitkräfte). In this position, he also took part in the Battle of Jutland, where he commanded the SMS Rostock. On 1 June 1917 he was appointed commander of the submarine forces (Befehlshaber der U-Boote), which he held until the end of the war.

== Later years ==
After the signing of the Armistice of 11 November 1918, Michelsen served as Chief of Staff of the High Seas Fleet. After that, from 22 December 1918 he served as Chief of Staff of the North Sea Naval Area. On 2 January 1919 he became Commander of that area. In November 1919 he was promoted to the rank of Rear Admiral and promoted to Vice Admiral in January 1920. In December 1920 he retired. He died on 8 April 1932 at the age of 64 in Fallingbostel.

== Awards ==
- Order of the Red Eagle, 3rd Class
- Order of the Red Eagle, 4th Class
- Order of the Crown, 2nd Class
- House Order of Hohenzollern with swords
- Iron Cross, 1st Class
- Iron Cross, 2nd Class
- Military Merit Order, III Class with swords
- Order of the Griffon
- Friedrich-August-Kreuz, 1st Class
- Friedrich-August-Kreuz, 2nd Class
- Knight of the Albert Order, 2nd Class

=== Foreign awards ===
- Romania: Order of the Star of Romania, Knight
- United Kingdom: Royal Victorian Order, Knight
