= HMS Munster =

British M-Class destroyer

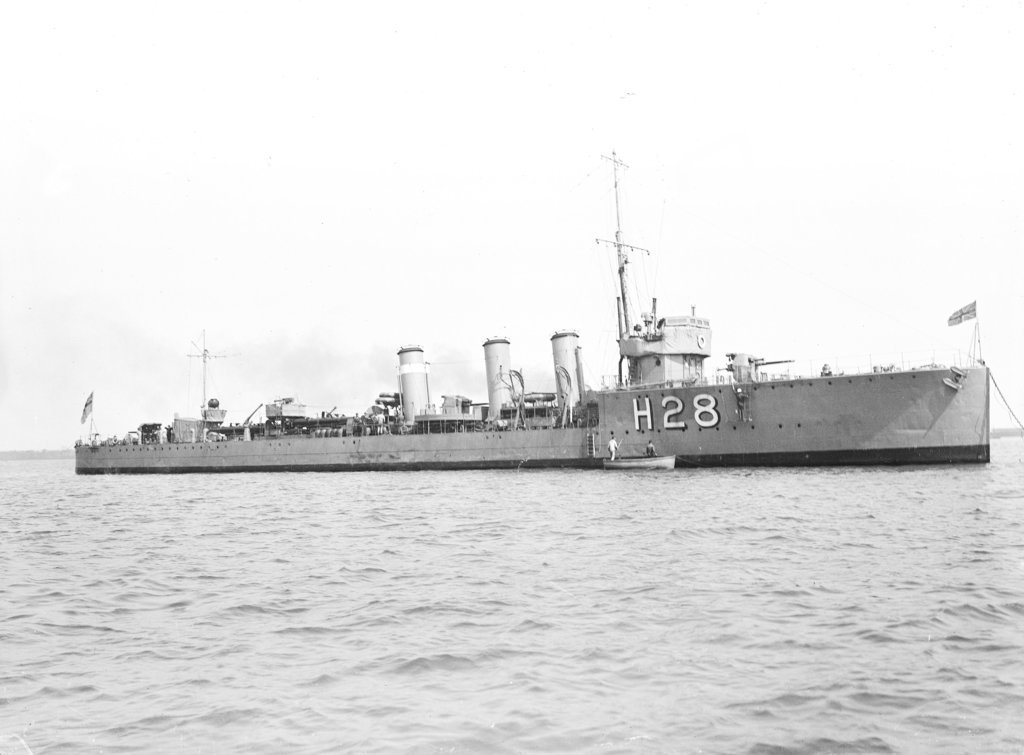
- Sister ship Orpheus

History

United Kingdom
- Name: HMS Munster
- Namesake: Munster
- Ordered: September 1914
- Builder: Thornycroft, Woolston, Southampton
- Laid down: November 1914
- Launched: 24 November 1915
- Completed: January 1916
- Out of service: 15 November 1921
- Fate: Sold to be broken up

General characteristics
- Class & type: Admiralty M-class destroyer
- Displacement: 971 long tons (987 t) (normal)
- Length: 273 ft 4 in (83.3 m) (o/a); 265 feet (80.8 m) (p.p.)
- Beam: 26 ft 8 in (8.1 m)
- Draught: 8 ft 11 in (2.7 m)
- Installed power: 3 Yarrow boilers, 25,000 shp (19,000 kW)
- Propulsion: Parsons steam turbines, 3 shafts
- Speed: 34 knots (63 km/h; 39 mph)
- Range: 2,530 nmi (4,690 km; 2,910 mi) at 15 kn (28 km/h; 17 mph)
- Complement: 80
- Armament: 3 × single QF 4-inch (102 mm) guns; 2 × single 1-pdr 37 mm (1.5 in) AA guns; 2 × twin 21 in (533 mm) torpedo tubes

HMS Munster was an Admiralty M-class destroyer which served in the Royal Navy during the First World War. The M class was an improvement on those of the preceding L class, capable of higher speed. Named after the Irish province of Munster, the destroyer was launched in 1915 and joined the Twelfth Destroyer Flotilla of the Grand Fleet. In 1916, Munster rescued survivors from the armed merchantman Alcantara and then fought in the Battle of Jutland as part of the Twelfth Destroyer Flotilla. The flotilla sank the German torpedo boat V48. At the end of the battle, the destroyer returned to Scapa Flow undamaged. During the following year, the warship participated in the unsuccessful search for the armoured cruiser Hampshire and the Second Battle of Heligoland Bight. Neither led to the warship being involved in any action with the enemy. The destroyer finished the war with the Third Destroyer Flotilla. After the Armistice, Munster was placed in reserve before being sold to be broken up in 1921.

== Design and development ==
Munster was one of the sixteen Admiralty M-class destroyers ordered by the British Admiralty in September 1914 as part of the First War Programme. The M class was an improved version of the earlier L-class, required to reach a higher speed in order to counter rumoured new German fast destroyers. The remit was to have a maximum speed of 36 knots (67 km/h; 41 mph) and, although ultimately the destroyers fell short of that ambition in service, the extra performance that was achieved was valued by the navy. It transpired that the German warships did not exist.

The destroyer had a length of 265 ft (80.8 m) between perpendiculars and 273 ft 4 in (83.3 m) overall, with a beam of 26 ft 8 in (8.1 m) and draught of 8 ft 11 in (2.7 m). Displacement was 971 long tons (987 t) normal. Power was provided by three Yarrow boilers feeding Brown-Curtiss rated at 23,000 shaft horsepower (17,000 kW), driving three shafts and exhausting through three funnels. Design speed was 34 knots (63 km/h; 39 mph), although Munster managed 33.88 knots (62.75 km/h; 38.99 mph) on 22,500 shp (16,800 kW) during trials. A total of 228 long tons (232 t) of oil was carried. Design range was 2,530 nautical miles (4,690 km; 2,910 mi) at 15 knots (28 km/h; 17 mph), but actual endurance in service was less; sister ship Murray had a range of 2,240 nautical miles (4,150 km; 2,580 mi) at 15 knots (28 km/h; 17 mph).

Munster had a main armament consisting of three single QF 4-inch (102 mm) Mk IV guns on the centreline, with one on the forecastle, one aft on a raised platform and one between the middle and aft funnels. Torpedo armament consisted of two twin torpedo tubes for 21 in (533 mm) torpedoes located aft of the funnels. Two single 1-pounder 37 mm (1.5 in) "pom-pom" anti-aircraft guns were carried. The anti-aircraft guns were later replaced by 2-pdr 40 mm (1.6 in) "pom-pom" guns. The ship had a complement of 80 officers and ratings.

== Construction and career ==
Munster was laid down by John I. Thornycroft & Company at their yard in Woolston, Southampton in November 1914, was launched on 24 November the following year and was completed three months later in January 1916. The vessel was the only vessel in the Royal Navy to be named after the Irish province of Munster, previously the Kingdom of Munster.

Munster was deployed as part of the Grand Fleet, joining the Twelfth Destroyer Flotilla. On 26 and 27 February, the flotilla took part in a large naval exercise east of Shetland, involving four flotillas of destroyers, as well as all the operational battlecruisers, battleships and cruisers of the Grand Fleet. The exercise was deemed a success. Two days later, the armed merchantman Alcantara sank after attacking the German merchant raider Grief. Munster and the light cruiser Comus left Scapa Flow and sped to the site of the conflict. Fearing submarine attacks, the warships initially held back and sank the German warship with gunfire. The destroyer subsequently rescued 200 survivors and, along with the surgeon from Alcantara, John Berry, returned to port.

On 30 May, the destroyer sailed with the Grand Fleet to confront the German High Seas Fleet in what would be the Battle of Jutland, forming part of the First Half of the Flotilla that was led by Faulknor and included sister ships Maenad, Marvel and Mindful. The destroyer was deployed in action against the German light cruisers, but lagged behind the main division and so did not participate in the action. However, in the battle melee, the division also got within the range of the main batteries of the battleships and battlecruisers which were at the centre of the action. The destroyer took up a defensive position between the British battleships and battlecruisers. Shortly afterwards, the division saw the approaching line of the German Third Torpedo Boat Flotilla and attacked. The destroyer, along with the rest of the flotilla, sank the torpedo boat V48, previously disabled by the destroyer Shark. Munster was undamaged in the action.

The flotilla returned to Scapa Flow on 2 June. A few days later, Munster joined the unsuccessful search for the armoured cruiser Hampshire, sunk by a German mine off the coast of Mainland, Orkney. The destroyer remained part of the Twelfth Destroyer Flotilla on 19 August, based at Scapa Flow. On 17 June 1917, Munster, along with Strongbow, was sent out to assist the merchant ship Queen Adelaide, which had seen a submarine. The destroyers failed to find the ship, which was sunk by U-70. On 16 November, the destroyer was deployed as part of a screen for the First Battle Squadron to take part in the Second Battle of Heligoland Bight. The warship saw no action in the battle.

At the end of the war, Munster was part of the Third Destroyer Flotilla. After the Armistice that ended the war, the Royal Navy returned to a peacetime level of strength and both the number of ships and personnel needed to be reduced to save money. The destroyer was transferred to reserve at Portsmouth. However, the harsh conditions of wartime operations, particularly the combination of high speed and the poor weather that is typical of the North Sea, exacerbated by the fact that the hull was not galvanised, meant that the ship was soon worn out. Munster was declared superfluous to operational requirements, retired, and, on 15 November 1921, was sold to Cashmore of Newport, Wales, and broken up.

== Pennant numbers ==
Pennant number	Date
G33	January 1917
G7A	June 1918
G35	January 1919
H8C	August 1918
