= HMS Obedient (1916) =

British M-Class destroyer

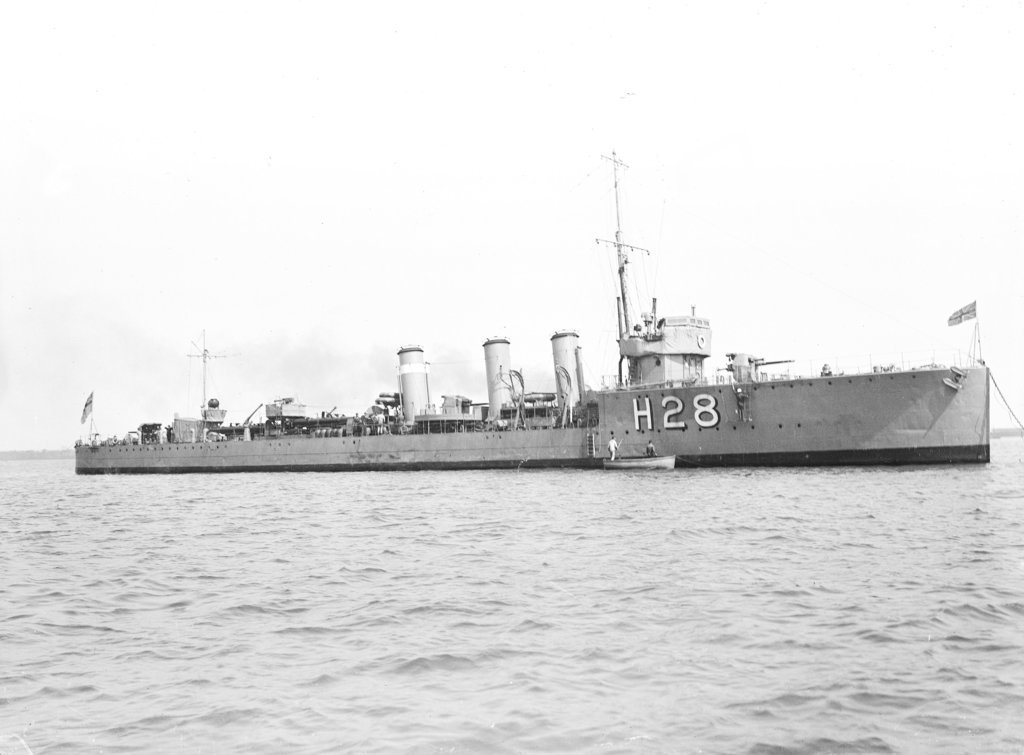
- Sister ship HMS Orpheus in 1918

History

United Kingdom
- Name: HMS Obedient
- Ordered: November 1914
- Builder: Scotts of Greenock
- Yard number: 464
- Launched: 6 November 1915
- Completed: February 1916
- Out of service: 25 November 1921
- Fate: Sold to be broken up

General characteristics
- Class & type: Admiralty M-class destroyer
- Displacement: 950 long tons (970 t) (normal); 1,123 long tons (1,141 t) (full load)
- Length: 265 ft (81 m) (p.p)
- Beam: 26 ft 8 in (8.13 m)
- Draught: 8 ft 8 in (2.64 m)
- Installed power: 3 Yarrow boilers, 25,000 shp (19,000 kW)
- Propulsion: Parsons steam turbines, 3 shafts
- Speed: 34 knots (63.0 km/h; 39.1 mph)
- Range: 2,530 nmi (4,690 km; 2,910 mi) at 15 kn (28 km/h; 17 mph)
- Complement: 76
- Armament: 3 × single QF 4-inch (102 mm) guns; 1 × single 2 pdr (40 mm (2 in)) AA gun; 2 × twin 21 in (533 mm) torpedo tubes

HMS Obedient was a Repeat Admiralty M-class destroyer which served with the Royal Navy during the First World War. The M class was an improvement on the preceding L class, capable of higher speed. Launched in 1915, the destroyer served with the Twelfth Destroyer Flotilla of the Grand Fleet during the Battle of Jutland in 1916, helping sink the torpedo boat V48 and narrowiy missing the German battleships as they withdrew. Subsequently, Obedient took part in anti-submarine patrols, attacking U-70 in 1917, and then escorting convoys travelling to Norway. In 1918, Obedient was part of the Fourth Destroyer Flotilla. The conditions of service meant that the destroyer was soon worn out and, after the armistice that ended the war, Obedient was placed in reserve. Despite a service life of only five years, the vessel was decommissioned and, in 1921, sold to be broken up.

== Design and development ==
Obedient was one of twenty-two Repeat Admiralty M-class destroyers ordered by the British Admiralty in November 1914 as part of the Third War Construction Programme near the start of the First World War. The M class was an improved version of the earlier L-class destroyers, required to reach a higher speed in order to counter rumoured German fast destroyers. The design was to achieve a speed of 36 knots (67 km/h; 41 mph), although the destroyers did not achieve this in service. It transpired that the German ships did not exist but the greater performance was appreciated by the Royal Navy. The Repeat M class were the product of follow-on orders received from the Admiralty after war had been declared but differed from the prewar vessels in having design improvements based on wartime experience.

The destroyer was 265 feet (81 m) long between perpendiculars, with a beam of 26 ft 8 in (8.13 m) and a draught of 8 ft 8 in (2.64 m). Displacement was 950 long tons (970 t) normal and 1,123 long tons (1,141 t) full load. Power was provided by three Yarrow boilers feeding Parsons steam turbines rated at 25,000 shaft horsepower (19,000 kW). The turbines drove three shafts and exhausted through three funnels. Design speed was 34 knots (63 km/h; 39 mph), which the vessel exceeded on trials. A total of 228 long tons (232 t) of oil was carried. Design range was 2,530 nautical miles (4,690 km; 2,910 mi) at 15 knots (28 km/h; 17 mph), but actual endurance in service was less; sister ship Murray had a range of 2,240 nautical miles (4,150 km; 2,580 mi) at 15 knots (28 km/h; 17 mph).

Armament consisted of three single QF 4-inch (102 mm) Mk IV guns on the ship's centreline, with one on the forecastle, one aft on a raised platform and one between the middle and aft funnels. A single QF 2-pounder 40 mm (1.6 in) "pom-pom" anti-aircraft gun was carried, while torpedo armament consisted of two twin mounts for 21 in (533 mm) torpedoes. To combat submarines, the destroyer was fitted with racks and storage for depth charges. Initially, only two depth charges were carried but the number increased in service and by 1918, the vessel was carrying between 30 and 50 depth charges. The ship had a complement of 80 officers and ratings.

== Construction and career ==
Obedient was laid down by Scotts Shipbuilding and Engineering Company at their shipyard in Greenock with the yard number 464, launched on 6 November 1915 and completed in February the following year. The ship was the first of the name to serve with the navy. The vessel was deployed as part of the Grand Fleet, joining the Twelfth Destroyer Flotilla.

On 30 May 1916, the destroyer sailed with the Grand Fleet to confront the German High Seas Fleet in what would be the Battle of Jutland. The destroyer formed part of the First Division of the Flotilla, led by Faulknor and also including sister ships Marvel, Mindful and Onslaught. As evening fell on the following day, the flotilla steamed ahead of the First Battle Squadron. The division saw the approaching line of the German Third Torpedo Boat Flotilla and attacked. Obedient reported a destroyer sunk by gunfire, likely the torpedo boat V48, previously disabled by Shark. As the battle closed, the Flotilla spotted the retreating German line. The First Division was ordered to attack and use their superior speed to overtake the German ships. Obedient launched two torpedoes at the battleships. A hit was claimed against the pre-dreadnought Pommern, but it is likely that both missed. The German ships returned fire with 5.9 in (150 mm) and 3.5 in (89 mm) guns but did not hit the destroyer. Obedient and Marvel then attacked the German light cruisers, but withdrew without recording any hits.

The destroyer was subsequently involved in anti-submarine patrols off the coast of the Hebrides between 15 and 22 June the following year. During one of the patrols, Obedient was successful in driving away the submarine U-70, but not before the merchant ship SS Buffalo, which had been heading for New York, had been attacked with torpedo and gunfire. Obedient attempted to take the stricken vessel in tow, but this was unsuccessful and the ship sank on 19 June. On 15 October, the destroyer formed part of a large-scale operation, involving 30 cruisers and 54 destroyers deployed in eight groups across the North Sea in an unsuccessful attempt to stop a suspected sortie by German naval forces. These failures were not untypical and the Admiralty redeployed the destroyers of the Grand Fleet from patrols to escorting convoys. By the end of October, Obedient was one of eight travelling the North Sea with convoys to Norway. Escort for convoys were typically nine M-class destroyers. At the end of the war in 1918, Obedient was part of the Fourth Destroyer Flotilla based at Devonport.

After the armistice, the Grand Fleet was disbanded. The Royal Navy returned to a peacetime level of strength and both the number of ships and the amount of staff needed to be reduced to save money. On 21 October 1919, the destroyer was reduced and placed in reserve at Devonport. However, this did not last long as the harsh conditions of wartime service, particularly the combination of high speed and the poor weather that is typical of the North Sea, exacerbated by the fact that the hull was not galvanised, meant that the destroyer was worn out. After being decommissioned, Obedient was sold to Hayes on 25 November 1921 to be broken up in Porthcawl.

== Pennant numbers ==
Pennant number	Date
G25	September 1916
G40	January 1917
G39	January 1918
G04	January 1919
H88	June 1918
HA3	January 1922
