= HMS Mindful =

British M-Class destroyer

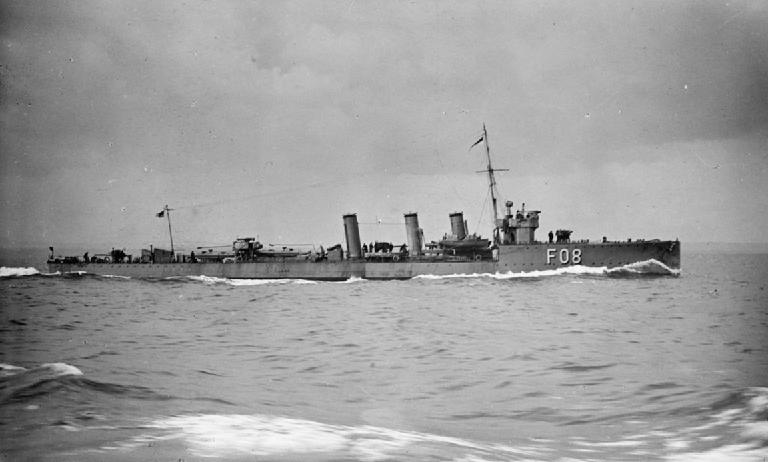
- Sister ship HMS Oracle

History

United Kingdom
- Name: HMS Mindful
- Ordered: November 1914
- Builder: Fairfield, Govan
- Launched: 24 August 1915
- Completed: 10 November 1915
- Out of service: 22 September 1921
- Fate: Sold to be broken up

General characteristics
- Class & type: Admiralty M-class destroyer
- Displacement: 911 long tons (926 t) (normal); 1,028 long tons (1,044 t) (deep load)
- Length: 265 ft (80.8 m) p.p.
- Beam: 26 ft 8 in (8.1 m)
- Draught: 8 ft 11 in (2.7 m)
- Installed power: 3 Yarrow boilers, 25,000 shp (19,000 kW)
- Propulsion: Brown-Curtis steam turbines, 3 screws
- Speed: 34 knots (63.0 km/h; 39.1 mph)
- Range: 2,280 nmi (4,220 km; 2,620 mi) at 17 kn (31 km/h; 20 mph)
- Complement: 80
- Armament: 3 × single QF 4 in (102 mm) guns; 1 × single 2-pounder (40 mm) "pom-pom" anti-aircraft gun; 2 × twin 21 in (533 mm) torpedo tubes

HMS Mindful was a Admiralty M-class destroyer which served with the Royal Navy during the First World War. The M class destroyers were an improvement on the previous L-class, capable of higher speed. The vessel, launched in 1915, joined the Twelfth Destroyer Flotilla under the flotilla leader Faulknor. The ship saw action during the Battle of Jutland in May 1916 and helped sink the German torpedo boat SMS V48. In March 1917, the destroyer was involved in a friendly fire incident, nearly sinking the British submarine G12. In June that year, the vessel was involved in the sinking of the German merchant ship SS Gamma in Norwegian waters, which led to a diplomatic protest from the Norwegian government. At the end of the war, Mindful was withdrawn from service and, in 1921, sold to be broken up.

== Design and development ==
Mindful was one of nine Admiralty M-class destroyer destroyers ordered by the British Admiralty in November 1914 as part of the Second War Construction Programme. The M-class was an improved version of the earlier L-class destroyers, required to reach a higher speed in order to counter rumoured German fast destroyers. The remit was to have a maximum speed of 36 knots (67 km/h; 41 mph), and although the eventual design did not achieve this, the greater performance of the M-class was appreciated by the navy. It transpired that the German ships did not exist.

The destroyer had a length of 265 feet (80.8 m) between perpendiculars, with a beam of 26 feet 8 inches (8.1 m) and a draught of 8 feet 11 inches (2.7 m) at deep load. Displacement was 911 long tons (926 t) normal and 1,028 long tons (1,044 t) deep load. Power was provided by three Yarrow boilers feeding Brown-Curtis steam turbines rated at 25,000 shaft horsepower (19,000 kW) and driving three shafts, to give a design speed of 34 knots (63 km/h; 39 mph). The vessel achieved 33.54 knots (62.12 km/h; 38.60 mph) in trials. Three funnels were fitted. A total of 268 long tons (272 t) of oil could be carried, including 40 long tons (41 t) in peace tanks that were not used in wartime, giving a range of 2,280 nautical miles (4,220 km; 2,620 mi) at 17 knots (31 km/h; 20 mph).

Armament consisted of three single QF 4-inch (102 mm) Mk IV guns on the ship's centreline, with one on the forecastle, one aft on a raised platform and one between the middle and aft funnels. Torpedo armament consisted of two twin mounts for 21 in (533 mm) torpedoes. A single QF 2-pounder 40 mm (1.6 in) "pom-pom" anti-aircraft gun was mounted between the torpedo tubes. The ship had a complement of 80 officers and ratings.

== Construction and career ==
Mindful was launched by Fairfield Shipbuilding and Engineering Company at their shipyard in Govan on the River Clyde on 24 August 1915 and completed on 10 November the same year. This was the first time the name had been used by the Royal Navy. The vessel was deployed as part of the Grand Fleet, joining the Twelfth Destroyer Flotilla under the flotilla leader Faulknor.

On 30 May 1916, the destroyer sailed with the Grand Fleet to confront the German High Seas Fleet in what would be the Battle of Jutland. The destroyer formed part of the First Division of the Flotilla, led by Faulknor and also including sister ships Marvel, Obedient and Onslaught. The destroyer was deployed in action against the German light cruisers. At 6:29 PM on 1 June, the destroyer was hit by a 12 in (300 mm) shell, but it did not explode. Shortly afterwards, the division saw the approaching line of the German Third Torpedo Boat Flotilla and attacked. The destroyer, along with the rest of the flotilla, sank the torpedo boat V48, previously disabled by the destroyer Shark. As the battle closed, the Flotilla spotted the retreating German line. The First Division was ordered to attack and use their superior speed to speed ahead of the German ships. However, Mindful had only two boilers working and so did not follow Faulknor. Instead, the destroyer headed south and acted independently. The destroyer twice tried to attack the German fleet, both times having to turn away to avoid colliding with other Royal Navy destroyers.

After the battle, the destroyer served in anti-submarine patrols. On 20 August, while patrolling east of the Orkney Islands, the destroyer fired at the German submarine UB-27, successfully driving the submarine down, thus rescuing the trawler Pacific that had been under attack from the submarine. On 15 March 1917, the destroyer was involved in a friendly fire incident. Along with sister ships Maenad, Nessus and Noble, the destroyer attacked what was believed to be a German submarine, which was reported sunk. It turned out that the ships were attacking the British submarine G12, which was damaged but was not sunk.

On 2 June 1917, Mindful was involved in the sinking of the German steamship, SS Gamma. The destroyer was patrolling off the Norwegian coast along with the light cruiser Cambrian and sister ship Marvel when the merchantman was spotted. A warning shot was fired and Gamma turned to the Norwegian shore. The British vessels pursued and Marvel fired a torpedo that sank the ship. The Norwegian government protested the violation of their neutrality and presented the UK government with a bill of 3,406,124 marks, given to them by the German government, which the British government ignored. The cruise also led to protests from five other vessels, sailing under Norwegian and Swedish flags, four of which the Royal Navy admitted were stopped in neutral waters.

After the Armistice, the Royal Navy returned to a peacetime level of strength. Initially, Mindful was transferred to the Defence Flotilla at Devonport. However, the harsh conditions of wartime service, exacerbated by the fact that the hull was not galvanised and operations often required high speed in high seas, meant that the destroyer was worn out and ready for retirement. On 22 September 1921, the vessel was sold to G. Cohen and broken up in Germany.

== Pennant numbers ==
Pennant number	Date
G04	September 1915
G31	January 1918
H91	June 1918
F95	January 1919
