= HMS Onslaught (1915) =

British M-Class destroyer

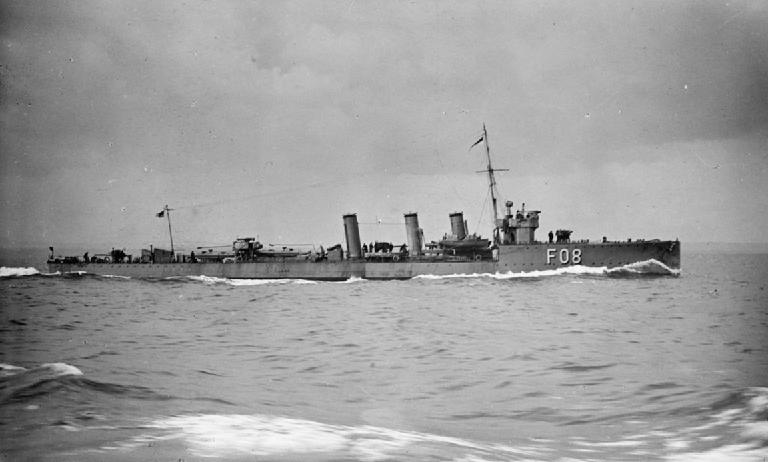
- Sister ship HMS Oracle

History

United Kingdom
- Name: HMS Onslaught
- Ordered: November 1914
- Builder: Fairfield, Govan
- Launched: 4 December 1915
- Completed: 3 March 1916
- Out of service: 30 October 1921
- Fate: Sold to be broken up

General characteristics
- Class & type: Admiralty M-class destroyer
- Displacement: 950 long tons (970 t) normal; 1,021 long tons (1,037 t) full load
- Length: 265 ft (80.77 m) p.p.
- Beam: 26 ft 9 in (8.15 m)
- Draught: 16 ft 3 in (4.95 m)
- Installed power: 3 Yarrow boilers 25,000 shp (19,000 kW)
- Propulsion: 2 Brown-Curtis steam turbines, 2 shafts
- Speed: 34 knots (63.0 km/h; 39.1 mph)
- Range: 3,450 nmi (6,390 km; 3,970 mi) at 15 kn (28 km/h; 17 mph)
- Complement: 76
- Armament: 3 × single QF 4 in (102 mm) guns; 1 × single 2-pounder (40 mm) "pom-pom" anti-aircraft gun; 2 × twin 21 in (533 mm) torpedo tubes

HMS Onslaught was a Admiralty M-class destroyer which served with the Royal Navy during the First World War. The M class were an improvement on the previous L-class, capable of higher speed. The vessel, launched in 1915, joined the Twelfth Destroyer Flotilla under the flotilla leader Faulknor. The ship saw action during the Battle of Jutland in May 1916, jointly sinking the German torpedo boat SMS V48 and launching the torpedo that sank the pre-dreadnought battleship Pommern, the only German battleship to be lost in the battle. Subsequently, the destroyer acted as an escort to other naval ships during the Action of 19 August 1916 and took part in anti-submarine operations. At the end of the war, Onslaught was withdrawn from service and, in 1921, sold to be broken up.

== Design and development ==
Onslaught was one of twenty-two Admiralty M-class destroyer destroyers ordered by the British Admiralty in November 1914 as part of the Third War Construction Programme. The M-class was an improved version of the earlier L-class destroyers, required to reach a higher speed in order to counter rumoured German fast destroyers. The remit was to have a maximum speed of 36 knots (67 km/h; 41 mph), and although the eventual design did not achieve this, the greater performance was appreciated by the navy. It transpired that the German ships did not exist.

The destroyer was 265 feet (80.77 m) long between perpendiculars, with a beam of 26 feet 9 inches (8.15 m) and a draught of 16 feet 3 inches (4.95 m). Displacement was 950 long tons (970 t) normal and 1,021 long tons (1,037 t) deep load. Power was provided by three Yarrow boilers feeding two Brown-Curtis steam turbines rated at 25,000 shaft horsepower (19,000 kW) and driving two shafts, to give a design speed of 34 knots (63 km/h; 39 mph). Three funnels were fitted and 296 long tons (301 t) of oil was carried, giving a design range of 3,450 nautical miles (6,390 km; 3,970 mi) at 15 knots (28 km/h; 17 mph).

Armament consisted of three single QF 4-inch (102 mm) Mk IV guns on the ship's centreline, with one on the forecastle, one aft on a raised platform and one between the middle and aft funnels. A single 2-pounder (40 mm) Mk II pom-pom anti-aircraft gun was carried, while torpedo armament consisted of two twin mounts for 21 in (533 mm) torpedoes. The ship had a complement of 76 officers and ratings.

== Construction and career ==
Onslaught was launched by Fairfield Shipbuilding and Engineering Company at their shipyard in Govan on the River Clyde on 4 December 1915 and completed on 3 March the following year. This was the first time the name had been used in the Royal Navy. The vessel was deployed as part of the Grand Fleet, joining the Twelfth Destroyer Flotilla under the flotilla leader Faulknor. On 22 April, the destroyer operated with the light cruisers of the Grand Fleet off the Skegerrak.

On 30 May 1916, the destroyer sailed with the Grand Fleet to confront the German High Seas Fleet in what would be the Battle of Jutland. The destroyer formed part of the First Division of the Flotilla, led by Faulknor and also including sister ships Marvel, Mindful and Obedient. The destroyer was deployed in action against the German light cruisers. Shortly afterwards, the division saw the approaching line of the German Third Torpedo Boat Flotilla and attacked. The destroyer, along with the rest of the flotilla, sank the torpedo boat V48, previously disabled by the destroyer Shark. As the battle closed, the flotilla spotted the retreating German line. The First Division was ordered to attack and use their superior speed to speed ahead of the German ships. The destroyer attacked the German fleet, unleashing four torpedoes, at least one of which struck the pre-dreadnought battleship Pommern. The torpedoes caused the 17 cm (6.7 in) magazines to detonate, sinking the ship with all hands. This was the only battleship sunk during the battle. During the attack, a German shell had struck the destroyer's bridge, killing five crew.

The destroyer subsequently participated in the Action of 19 August 1916 as an escort for the light cruiser Royalist. While escorting the cruiser to rendezvous with a major part of the Grand Fleet, the vessel was attacked by the German submarine UB-27, but the torpedo missed. Onslaught subsequently also escorted the dreadnought battleship Iron Duke. In 1917, the Twelfth Destroyer Flotilla was involved in anti-submarine operations, and for nine days from 15 June the destroyer was stationed off the north of Scotland. The operation did not lead to the destruction of any submarines and the Admiralty increasingly redeployed the destroyers of the Grand Fleet to escorting convoys. During 1918, Onslaught was transferred to the Third Destroyer Flotilla.

After the Armistice, the Royal Navy returned to a peacetime level of strength and both the number of ships and the amount of staff needed to be reduced to save money. Onslaught was reduced to reserve on 17 October 1919. However, the harsh conditions of wartime service, exacerbated by the fact that the hull was not galvanised and operations often required high speed in high seas, meant that the destroyer was worn out and ready for retirement. On 30 October 1921, the vessel was sold to W. & A.T. Burden and broken up.

== Pennant numbers ==
Pennant number	Date
G22	September 1915
G40	January 1918
G8A	June 1918
G32	January 1919
