= Deutschland-class battleship =

Battleship class of the German Imperial Navy

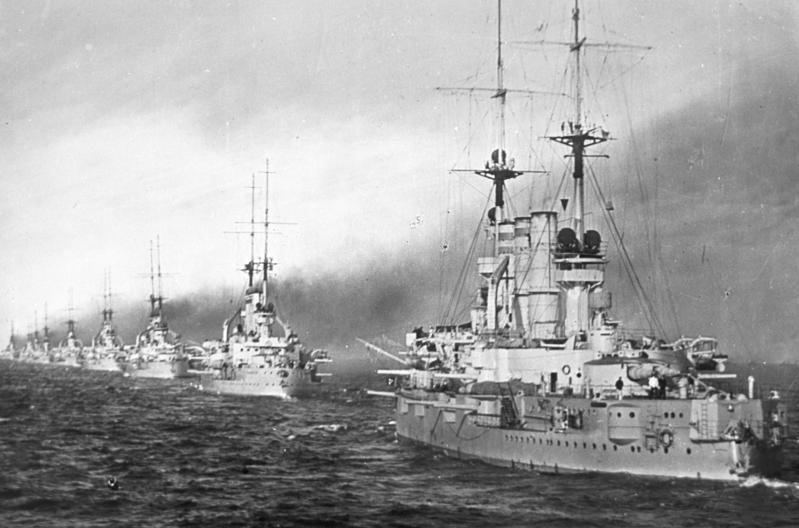
- Deutschland-class battleships in line (Note: The five nearest vessels are the Deutschland-class ships.)

Class overview
- Builders: Germaniawerft; Schichau-Werke; Kaiserliche Werft Wilhelmshaven; A G Vulcan
- Operators: Imperial German Navy; Reichsmarine; Kriegsmarine
- Preceded by: Braunschweig class
- Succeeded by: Nassau class
- Built: 1903–1908
- In commission: 1906–1945
- Completed: 5
- Lost: 3
- Scrapped: 2

General characteristics
- Type: Pre-dreadnought battleship
- Displacement: Normal: 13,191 t (12,983 long tons); Full load: 14,218 t (13,993 long tons)
- Length: Overall length: 127.6 m (418 ft 8 in)
- Beam: 22.2 m (72 ft 10 in)
- Draft: 8.21 m (26 ft 11 in)
- Installed power: 12 × water-tube boilers (Note: Deutschland had eight water-tube and six fire-tube boilers); 17,000 PS (12,503 kW; 16,767 ihp) (Note: These figures are for the four later ships; Deutschland had a slightly different powerplant that produced 16,000 PS (15,781 ihp; 11,768 kW), though her speed remained the same.)
- Propulsion: 3 × triple-expansion steam engines; 3 × screw propellers
- Speed: 18.5 to 19.1 knots (34.3 to 35.4 km/h; 21.3 to 22.0 mph)
- Range: 4,800 nmi (8,900 km; 5,500 mi); 10 knots (19 km/h; 12 mph)
- Complement: 35 officers; 708 enlisted men
- Armament: 4 × 28 cm (11 in) SK L/40 guns; 14 × 17 cm (6.7 in) SK L/40 guns; 20 × 8.8 cm (3.5 in) SK L/35 naval guns; 6 × 45 cm (17.7 in) torpedo tubes
- Armor: Belt: 100 to 240 mm (3.9 to 9.4 in) (Note: Figure for the four later ships; Deutschland's belt armor was only up to 225 mm (8.9 in) thick.); Turrets: 280 mm (11 in); Barbettes: 250 mm (9.8 in); Deck: 40 mm (1.6 in)

The Deutschland class was a group of five pre-dreadnought battleships built for the German Kaiserliche Marine (Imperial Navy), the last vessels of that type to be built in Germany. The class comprised Deutschland, the lead ship, Hannover, Pommern, Schlesien, and Schleswig-Holstein. The ships closely resembled those of the preceding Braunschweig class, but with stronger armor and a rearranged secondary battery. Built between 1903 and 1908, they were completed after the launch of the revolutionary British all-big-gun battleship HMS Dreadnought in 1906. As a result, they were obsolescent before entering service. The ships nevertheless saw extensive service in the High Seas Fleet, Germany's primary naval formation, through the late 1900s and early 1910s, when they were used for training, which included overseas cruises.

Following the start of World War I in July 1914, the German fleet adopted a strategy of raids on the British coast, which the five Deutschland-class ships supported. These operations culminated in the Battle of Jutland on 31 May – 1 June 1916, where all five ships saw action, despite their marked inferiority to British dreadnoughts. Regardless, they intervened to protect the battered German battlecruisers from their British counterparts, allowing them to escape. In the confused night actions, Pommern was torpedoed and sunk by a British destroyer. After the battle, the four surviving ships were removed from front-line service and used for coastal defense through mid-1917. Thereafter, Hannover alone remained on patrol duty, while the rest were used as barracks or training ships. After Germany's defeat, the Treaty of Versailles permitted the postwar navy to retain several old battleships for coastal defense, including the four Deutschland-class ships.

Deutschland was broken up in 1920–1922, but the remainder were modernized and returned to active service in the mid-1920s. Their activities mirrored those of the pre-war period, including overseas training cruises and extensive fleet maneuvers. Hannover was decommissioned in 1931 and was to be converted into a target vessel, although this was never done. She was eventually broken up in 1944–1946. Schlesien and Schleswig-Holstein remained in service for training duties through the 1930s into the Nazi-era Kriegsmarine (War Navy). Both ships saw limited duty during World War II, including bombardment of Polish forces during the invasion of Poland in September 1939 and the occupation of Denmark and invasion of Norway in April 1940. Both ships were sunk near the end of the war.

== Design ==
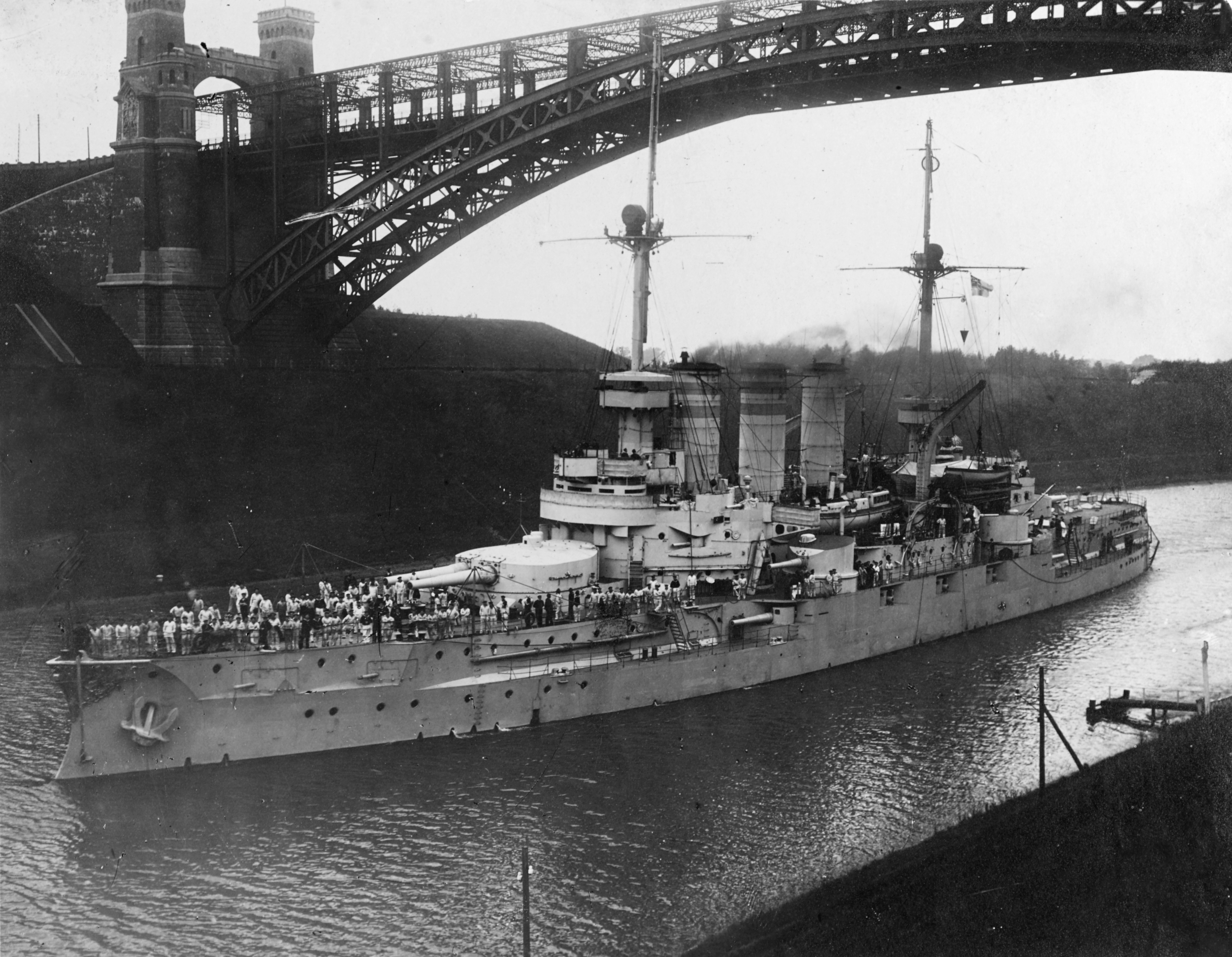
Lothringen, of the Braunschweig class, which provided the basis for the Deutschland design

In 1900, Vizeadmiral (Vice Admiral) Alfred von Tirpitz, the State Secretary for the Reichsmarineamt (Imperial Naval Office), secured the passage of the Second Naval Law, an amendment to the First Naval Law of 1898. The previous law had called for a total strength of nineteen battleships by 1 April 1904, which was reached with the five Wittelsbach-class battleships, but the new law increased the projected battle fleet to a total of thirty-eight. The first tranche of vessels—the Braunschweig class—introduced the 28 cm (11 in) gun, marking a significant increase in firepower over earlier German battleships. The naval command had intended to build ten battleships of the Braunschweig type, starting with the 1901 fiscal year with two ships built per year, but they ultimately only built five. During construction of the Braunschweigs, a series of minor improvements were incorporated into subsequent designs. By the time work began on the second vessel of the 1903 fiscal year, which became SMS Deutschland, a more significantly altered design had been prepared.

A series of changes were made to the secondary and tertiary batteries for what became Deutschland, the lead ship of the new class. The designers discarded the wing turrets that the Braunschweigs had used for some of their secondary guns; the turrets had required support structures whose elimination saved weight and allowed the designers to place the secondary battery entirely in casemates in a more efficient arrangement. Removing the turrets freed up deck space that was used to add another pair of 8.8 cm (3.5 in) guns and place the forward set of four in protective embrasures. Deutschland and her sister ship Hannover were designed for use as flagships for the fleet and a squadron, respectively, which required additional accommodation spaces. After Deutschland, which mixed sets of fire-tube and water-tube boilers, the remaining four members of the class received a uniform set of water-tube boilers. These were lighter, and the weight savings were passed on to the armor layout in the form of a slightly thicker armor belt and a strengthened upper deck.

The Deutschland design was criticized in Germany at the time the ships were being built, as the trend in all the major navies pointed to battleships armed with all-big-gun batteries; indeed, work on what would become the design for the Nassau class of dreadnought battleships had already begun in 1903. Tirpitz insisted on building the Deutschlands because they were the largest design that could fit in Germany's existing naval infrastructure, most significantly the Kaiser Wilhelm Canal. Widening the canal and improving harbor facilities would be excessively expensive and Tirpitz sought to avoid another budgetary fight with the Reichstag so soon after the passage of the 1900 law. As a result, the Deutschland-class battleships were rendered obsolescent almost immediately by the commissioning of the British HMS Dreadnought in December 1906.

=== General characteristics ===
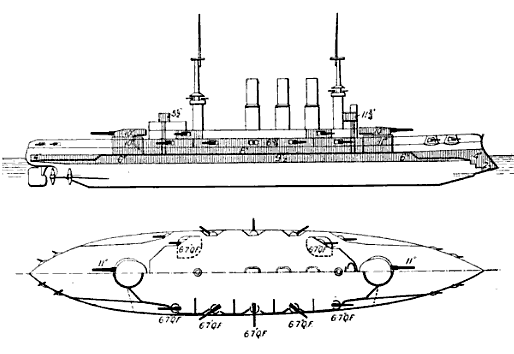
Line-drawing of the Deutschland class

The Deutschland-class ships were 125.9 m (413 ft 1 in) long at the waterline and 127.6 m (418 ft 8 in) overall. They had a beam of 22.2 m (72 ft 10 in) and a draft of 8.21 m (26 ft 11 in) forward. The ships were designed to displace 13,191 metric tons (12,983 long tons) normally, and displaced up to 14,218 metric tons (13,993 long tons) at full load. Their hulls were built with transverse and longitudinal steel frames, to which steel hull plates were riveted. The hull was divided into twelve watertight compartments, although Pommern had thirteen compartments. Their hulls included a double bottom that ran for 84 percent of the length of the ship.

Because Deutschland and Hannover were completed as flagships, they had an enlarged superstructure aft to house the larger command staffs they typically carried. Deutschland had a larger forward conning tower that incorporated a central fire-control position; Pommern received the same conning tower, but the other three ships had shorter towers without the fire-control room. All five members of the class were fitted with short military masts with lighter poles atop them that were fitted with spotting tops. The ships handled less easily than the preceding Braunschweig-class ships, though they suffered less marked weather helm. Their metacentric height was 0.98 m (3 ft 3 in). Steering was controlled with a single rudder.

The ships' crews numbered 35 officers and 708 enlisted men. When one of them was a flagship, the crew was augmented with an admiral's staff. A squadron commander's staff consisted of 13 officers and 66 enlisted men, while a divisional commander had a staff of 2 officers and 23 enlisted men. After she became a training ship in 1935, Schlesien's crew consisted of 29 officers and 559 enlisted men, plus up to 214 cadets. Schleswig-Holstein differed somewhat; her crew as a training ship numbered 31 officers and 565 men and up to 175 cadets. Deutschland and her sisters carried several smaller vessels, including two picket boats, one admiral's barge, two launches, one pinnace, two cutters, two yawls, and two dinghies. The boats were handled with a pair of large cranes amidships; Deutschland had hers located further forward than the other members of the class.

=== Machinery ===
Deutschland and her sisters were equipped with three triple-expansion steam engines that each drove a screw propeller; the outer screws were three-bladed and 4.80 m (15 ft 9 in) in diameter, while the center shaft used a four-bladed screw that was 4.5 m (14 ft 9 in) in diameter. Each engine was placed in its own engine room. Deutschland was fitted with eight water-tube boilers and six fire-tube boilers, but the rest of the vessels received twelve water-tube models, all of which were coal-fired. These were divided into three boiler rooms, each of which was ducted into a funnel.

Deutschland's engines were rated at 16,000 metric horsepower (15,781 ihp; 11,768 kW), while the other four ships' engines were rated at 17,000 metric horsepower (16,767 ihp; 12,503 kW). The design speed for all of the ships was 18 knots (33 km/h; 21 mph), though on trials all five ships exceeded both figures, Deutschland reaching 17,000 metric horsepower (17,000 ihp; 13,000 kW) for 18.6 knots (34.4 km/h; 21.4 mph) and the other members of the class making 17,696 to 19,330 metric horsepower (17,454 to 19,066 ihp; 13,015 to 14,217 kW) for 18.5 to 19.1 knots (34.3 to 35.4 km/h; 21.3 to 22.0 mph). Schleswig-Holstein was the fastest member of the class on her trials.

Deutschland was designed to carry 700 t (690 long tons; 770 short tons) of coal and the other members could carry 850 t (840 long tons; 940 short tons), though other spaces could be utilized as fuel storage, which increased fuel capacity to 1,540 t (1,520 long tons; 1,700 short tons) for Deutschland and 1,750 t (1,720 long tons; 1,930 short tons) for the other four vessels. This provided a maximum range of 4,800 nautical miles (8,900 km; 5,500 mi) at a cruising speed of 10 knots (19 km/h; 12 mph). Electrical power was supplied from four turbo generators that provided 260 kilowatts (350 hp) each at 110 volts.

=== Armament ===
Profile drawing of the 28 cm SK L/40 gun in the naval mounting

The ships carried the same main battery as the preceding Braunschweig class. The primary armament comprised four 28 cm SK L/40 (Note: In Imperial German Navy gun nomenclature, "SK" (Schnelladekanone) denotes that the gun is quick firing, while the L/40 denotes the length of the gun. In this case, the L/40 gun is 40 caliber, meaning that the gun is 40 times as long as its bore is.) quick-firing guns in hydraulically operated twin turrets. The turrets were placed on the centerline, one forward and one aft. The C/01 turrets allowed the guns to depress to −4 degrees, and elevate to +30 degrees, which enabled a maximum range of 18,800 meters (61,700 ft). The guns fired 240-kilogram (530 lb) shells at a muzzle velocity of 820 meters per second (2,700 ft/s). Ammunition storage amounted to 85 shells per gun.

The secondary battery consisted of fourteen 17 cm SK L/40 quick-firing guns, all of which were mounted in casemates. Five were placed on either side in the upper deck and the remaining four were located a deck above in the superstructure, one on each corner. The guns fired 64-kilogram (141 lb) shells at a muzzle velocity of 850 meters per second (2,800 ft/s). These guns were chosen as they used the largest shell that could be reasonably handled without machinery. The guns could elevate to 22 degrees, which allowed a maximum range of 14,500 m (15,900 yd). Their rate of fire was approximately one shot every nine to ten seconds, and each gun was supplied with 130 shells.

For defense against torpedo boats, the ships carried a tertiary battery of twenty 8.8 cm SK L/35 quick-firing guns. These were placed in casemates in hull sponsons, in embrasures in the superstructure, or in open mounts. The guns fired 7 kg (15.4 lb) shells at a muzzle velocity of 770 m/s (2,526 ft/s), and could be elevated to 25 degrees for a maximum range of 9,090 m (9,940 yd). The ammunition allotment for each gun was 130 shells. The ships were temporarily fitted with four 3.7 cm (1.5 in) machine cannon, but these were quickly removed.

They were also armed with six 45 cm (17.7 in) torpedo tubes, and 16 torpedoes. The tubes were all placed below the waterline, one in the bow, one in the stern, and two on each broadside. These torpedoes were 5.15 m (16.9 ft) long and carried a 147.5 kg (325 lb) TNT warhead. They could be set at two speeds for different ranges. At 26 knots (48 km/h; 30 mph), the weapons had a range of 3,000 m (9,800 ft). At an increased speed of 31 knots (57 km/h; 36 mph), the range was reduced to 1,500 m (4,900 ft).

=== Armor ===
The Deutschland-class ships were equipped with Krupp cemented armor. Deutschland had a slightly different arrangement in the belt armor and the citadel in the superstructure. Deutschland's belt was 225 mm (8.9 in) at the waterline and tapered to 140 mm (5.5 in) on the lower edge. Her sister ships' belts were increased in thickness to 240 mm (9.4 in) at the waterline and down to 170 mm (6.7 in) on the bottom edge. In all five ships, this section of armor extended from the forward barbette to the aft one. On either end, the belt was reduced to 100 mm (3.9 in). In all ships, the belt was backed by a layer of teak that was 80 mm (3.1 in) thick. Above the belt was a strake of armor that protected the casemate guns; in Deutschland, this was 160 mm (6.3 in) thick, while on the other four ships the armor was 170 mm thick. All members of the class were fitted with cork cofferdams, a common practice at the time intended to prevent uncontrolled flooding in the event of shell hits.

All five ships had an armored deck that was 40 mm (1.6 in) thick. The deck sloped downward at the sides to connect with the lower edge of the belt, which provided a second layer to contain shell fragments from hits that penetrated the belt. The sloped section was 97 mm (3.8 in) in the bow and stern sections where the belt was thinner, and reduced to 67 mm (2.6 in) behind the main section of belt. Their forward conning towers were protected by 300 mm (12 in) on the sides and 80 mm on the roofs, while the rear conning towers had 140 mm (5.5 in) worth of armor on the sides. The main battery gun turrets had armored sides that were 280 mm (11 in) thick and roofs that were 50 mm (2 in) thick. The barbettes that held the turrets were armored with 250 mm (9.8 in) thick steel.

=== Modifications ===
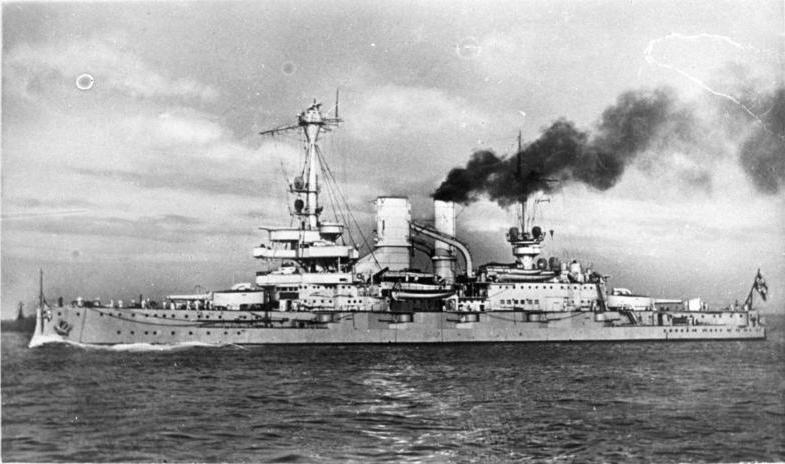
Schleswig-Holstein at some point between 1936 and 1939

The ships of the Deutschland class were modified several times over their long careers. Modifications to the ships' masts were made between 1909 and 1914, shifting positions for searchlights and adding a fully enclosed spotting top to the fore mast. Schlesien and Schleswig-Holstein had eight oil-fired boilers installed in place of eight of their coal-fired boilers in late 1915. Deutschland had two of her 8.8 cm guns removed in late 1916 and a pair of 8.8 cm guns in anti-aircraft mountings were installed. Beginning in 1917, some of the ships began to be partially or fully disarmed so the guns could be used ashore during the war. Deutschland was completely disarmed in late 1917 and Schleswig-Holstein was reduced to just four 10.5 cm (4.1 in) SK L/45 guns and four 8.8 cm SK L/30 guns in 1918. Schlesien was similarly re-armed for training duties.

As the ships were returned to active service in the early 1920s, they received a series of modernizations and alterations to their armament. Hannover, which had not been disarmed, carried her original battery of 28 cm and 17 cm guns, though her 8.8 cm battery had been reduced to eight weapons by the time she was recommissioned in 1921. All six of her torpedo tubes were removed at that time. Schlesien and Schleswig-Holstein were modernized in the mid-1920s, which included the re-installation of their 28 cm batteries, but in place of their 17 cm guns they each received fourteen 15 cm (5.9 in) SK L/45 guns, along with eight 8.8 cm guns as on Hannover. They had large tubular fore masts installed, which had large spotting tops. Schlesien had her two forward funnels merged, while Schleswig-Holstein had hers similarly modified in 1928. Schlesien had her forward sponsons plated over.

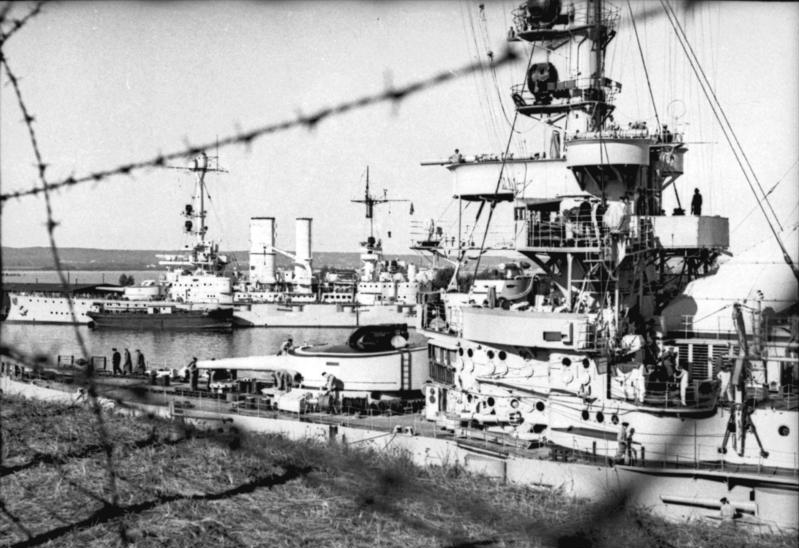
Schlesien (left) and Schleswig-Holstein in 1939

In 1930 and 1931, the ships were modified again. Hannover had a pair of above-water 50 cm (20 in) torpedo tubes fitted and four of her 8.8 cm guns were replaced with 8.8 cm anti-aircraft guns. A tubular mast like her sisters' was installed, and she had her bow sponsons plated over. Schlesien and Schleswig-Holstein each lost two of their 15 cm guns, received four of the 50 cm torpedo tubes, and exchanged all of their 8.8 guns for four 8.8 cm anti-aircraft guns. Both ships had another pair of 15 cm guns removed in 1935; Schlesien received four 2 cm (0.79 in) anti-aircraft guns at that time and Schleswig-Holstein received four the next year. Also in 1936, Schleswig-Holstein had her sponsons removed. As part of her conversion into a training ship, Schlesien had her remaining coal-burning boilers removed in 1938 and the boiler room became an accommodation space and training room for the cadets. The uptake from that boiler room was removed, leaving just two straight funnels.

After the start of World War II in September 1939, both ships underwent a series of changes to their armament, particularly to their anti-aircraft batteries. Schleswig-Holstein received another eight 2 cm guns that year. In February 1940, Schlesien received four 3.7 cm (1.5 in) L/83 anti-aircraft guns. In April, the ship had her remaining ten 15 cm guns removed, while Schleswig-Holstein lost three of hers. In August, Schlesien had her 3.7 cm guns taken off to strengthen the anti-aircraft defenses of Hamburg and Schleswig-Holstein was almost completely disarmed, retaining only her 28 cm guns. The following year, Schlesien received four 8.8 cm guns, four 3.7 cm guns, and three 2 cm guns. By 1943, Hannover had been reconstructed for her planned role as a target ship, which involved removing most of her superstructure and all of her guns, though the turrets remained. Schlesien had the 3.7 cm guns returned that year, and in 1944, a pair of 4 cm (1.6 in) Bofors guns were added, along with sixteen more 2 cm guns, bringing the total to twenty barrels. Later that year, the 8.8 cm guns were replaced with six 10.5 cm anti-aircraft guns, her 4 cm battery was increased to seven or ten guns, and her 2 cm battery altered to either eighteen or twenty-two guns. Schleswig-Holstein was under refit to be similarly equipped, but work was not completed before her loss; she was slated to receive six of the 10.5 cm guns, ten 4 cm guns, and twenty-six of the 2 cm guns in addition to the four 3.7 cm weapons.

== Construction ==
Construction data
Ship	Contract name	Builder	Laid down	Launched	Commissioned
Deutschland	N	Germaniawerft, Kiel	20 June 1903	19 November 1904	3 August 1906
Hannover	P	Kaiserliche Werft, Wilhelmshaven	7 November 1904	29 September 1905	1 October 1907
Pommern	O	AG Vulcan, Stettin	22 March 1904	2 December 1905	6 August 1907
Schlesien	R	Schichau-Werke, Danzig	19 November 1904	28 May 1906	5 May 1908
Schleswig-Holstein	Q	Germaniawerft, Kiel	18 August 1905	17 December 1906	6 July 1908

== Service history ==
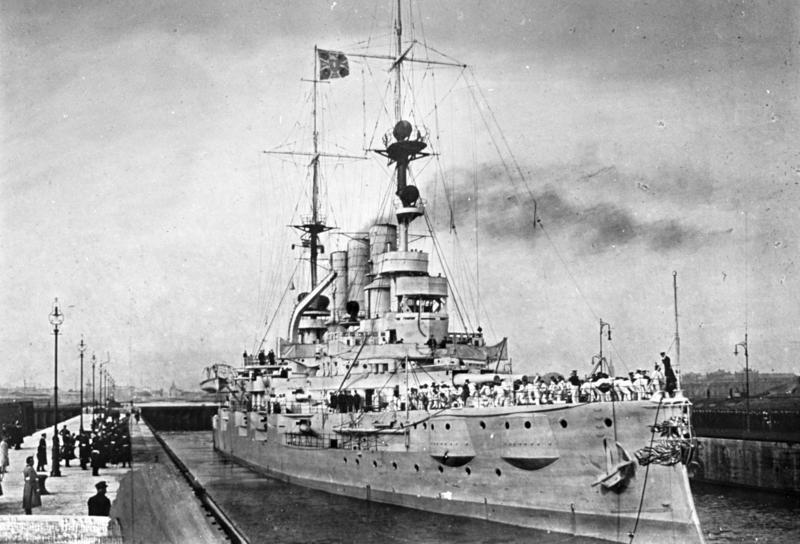
Deutschland in the Kaiser Wilhelm Canal in 1912

After Deutschland entered service in 1906, she replaced the battleship Kaiser Wilhelm II as the fleet flagship, a role she held until 1913, when the new dreadnought Friedrich der Grosse took her place. With the commissioning of the rest of the class, the Home Fleet was reorganized as the High Seas Fleet in 1907. The vessels were assigned to I Battle Squadron and II Battle Squadron during this period, ultimately being concentrated in II Squadron along with three of the Braunschweig-class ships by the early 1910s as the Nassau and Helgoland-class battleships filled the ranks of I Squadron. Hannover served as the flagship of I Squadron and later as the flagship of the deputy commander of II Squadron.

The ships' peacetime careers were fairly uneventful, consisting primarily of routine fleet training. Squadron and fleet exercises typically took place in April and May every year, a major fleet cruise generally followed in June and July, after which the fleet assembled for the annual large-scale maneuvers in late August and September. The major fleet cruises typically went to Norwegian waters in company with Kaiser Wilhelm II's yacht, though in 1908 and 1909, the fleet embarked on long-distance cruises out into the Atlantic, making visits to mainland Spain, the Canary Islands, and the Azores. These came at the insistence of the fleet commander of the time, Prince Heinrich, who foresaw the need to operate at greater distances. During the summer cruise in July 1914, the fleet remained off Norway owing to the July Crisis that resulted in the start of World War I.

=== World War I ===
Pommern before the war

Following the start of the war, the German fleet adopted a strategy of raids on the British coast to try to draw out portions of the British Grand Fleet where they could be defeated in detail. The battlecruisers of I Scouting Group conducted the raids while the battle squadrons of the High Seas Fleet stood by in support; these included the raid on Yarmouth in November 1914, the raid on Scarborough, Hartlepool and Whitby in December, and bombardment of Yarmouth and Lowestoft in April 1916. All five members of the class operated with the fleet during this period, though the anticipated battle failed to materialize during these operations. While not conducting fleet operations, the ships of II Squadron also patrolled the mouth of the river Elbe to support the light forces defending the German Bight; they also conducted training exercises in the relative safety of the Baltic Sea. In February 1915, Deutschland became the flagship of II Squadron.

In late May 1916, the Germans planned another operation to draw out the British fleet, which resulted in the Battle of Jutland on 31 May and 1 June. During the operation, the ships were commanded by Konteradmiral (Rear Admiral) Franz Mauve. Being significantly slower than the rest of the German line of battle, the ships of II Squadron saw no action during the first stages of the engagement. Toward the end of the fleet battle on the evening of 31 May, the five Deutschland-class ships came to the aid of the mauled battlecruisers of I Scouting Group, when Mauve placed his ships between them and their counterparts in the British Battle Cruiser Fleet. In the growing darkness, the Germans had difficulty making out their targets and failed to score any hits; the British managed to hit three of the Deutschlands. Pommern was forced briefly to haul out of line. Mauve then disengaged his ships, ending their only clash with British capital ships during the battle. As the German fleet withdrew overnight, II Squadron took up positions toward the rear of the German line. British light forces repeatedly clashed with the German fleet, and in one of these night actions, Pommern was hit by a torpedo from the destroyer HMS Onslaught, detonating one of her ammunition magazines and destroying the ship.

The German experience at Jutland demonstrated that pre-dreadnoughts had no place in a fleet action with dreadnoughts, and so the Deutschlands spent the rest of 1916 on coastal defense duty in the Elbe and occasionally in the Danish Straits. In August 1917, II Battle Squadron was disbanded and most of the ships were reduced to secondary duties, being partially disarmed to free up guns for use ashore. Deutschland and Schleswig-Holstein became barracks ships and Schlesien served as a training ship. Hannover remained in active service for guard duty in the straits.

=== Inter-war years ===
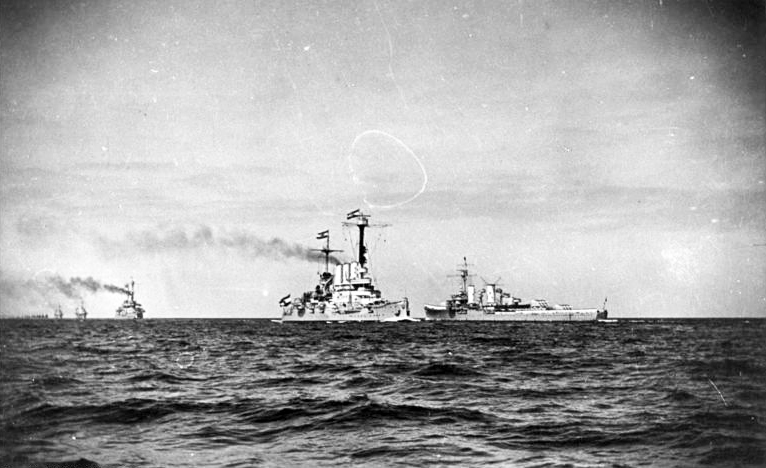
Hannover or Schleswig-Holstein during maneuvers in 1929; a light cruiser of the Königsberg class is to the right

Following Germany's defeat in the war, the fleet was significantly reduced in size by the Treaty of Versailles, which permitted the Germans to retain six battleships of the Braunschweig and Deutschland classes, and another two in reserve. Deutschland was discarded in 1920 and was broken up by 1922, but the other three members of the class were kept by the postwar navy, which was reorganized as the Reichsmarine (Navy of the Realm). All three ships were heavily modernized in the early 1920s to prepare them for active service. Hannover was the first member of the class to return to service, in 1921, becoming the fleet flagship, a role she alternated with Braunschweig. Schlesien and Schleswig-Holstein remained out of service until the middle of the decade, when they were rearmed; Schleswig-Holstein became the flagship on her recommissioning in 1926. Hannover was modernized again in the late 1920s after Schlesien recommissioned to take her place.

Throughout the 1920s, the ships took part in a training routine similar to that of the prewar years, including training exercises throughout the year and long-range training cruises that went as far as the Mediterranean Sea. The ships frequently went to Norwegian waters, as they had done under the Imperial government. Hannover was decommissioned in September 1931 and saw no further service, though there were plans to convert her into a target ship. Schleswig-Holstein and Schlesien remained on active duty into the early 1930s, but by 1933, the new heavy cruiser Deutschland had been commissioned, and so Schlesien was decommissioned to be converted into a dedicated training ship. Schleswig-Holstein followed for a similar rebuilding in 1935–1936. The two ships spent the rest of the decade training naval cadets, including a lengthy voyage to North and South America for Schlesien in 1936–1937. During this period, Germany came under the control of Adolf Hitler and the Nazi party, which set upon a rearmament strategy and an aggressive foreign policy that led to the outbreak of World War II in September 1939.

=== World War II ===
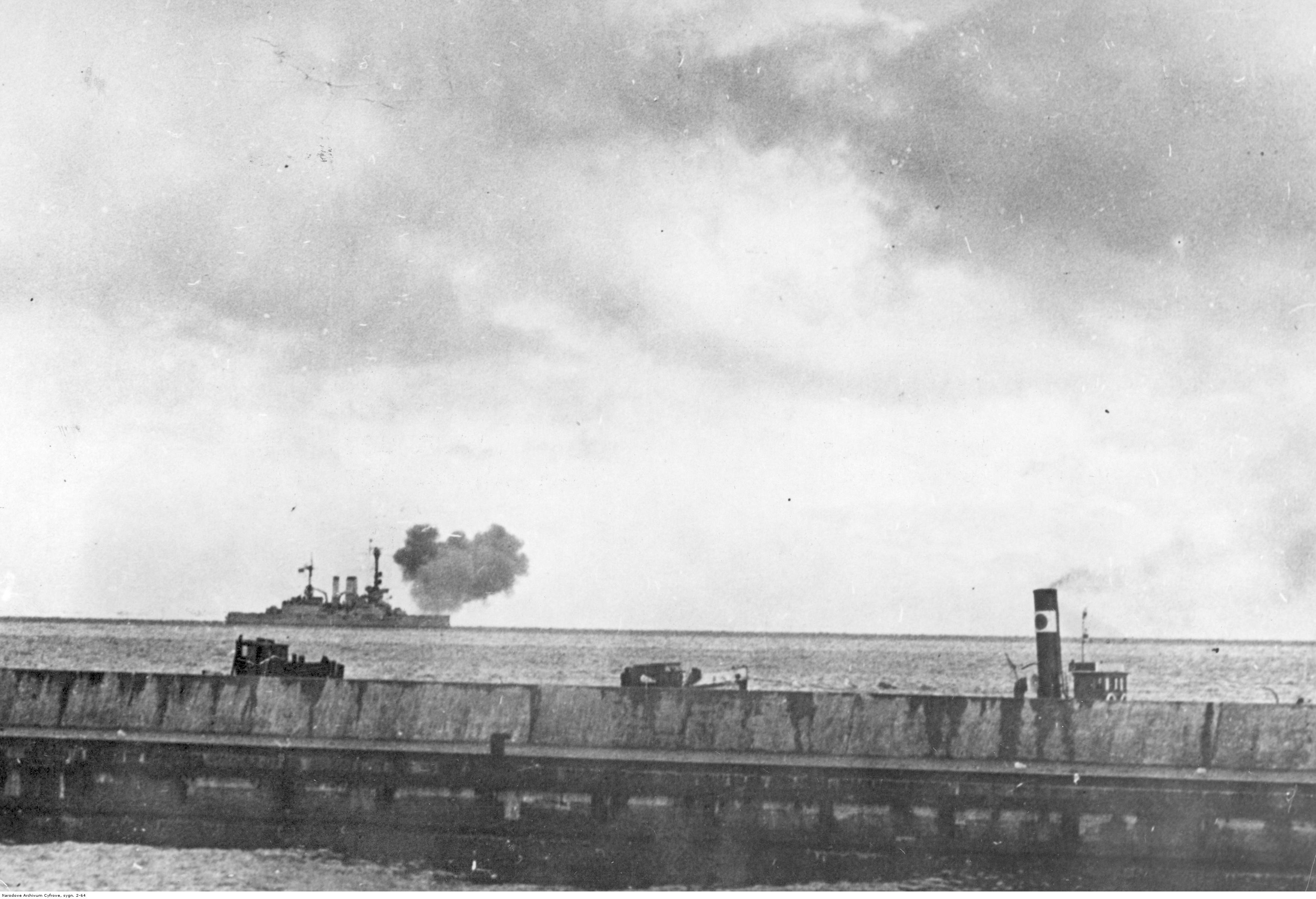
Schlesien firing at the Hel Fortified Area

Schleswig-Holstein steamed to the Free City of Danzig in late August 1939, and was moored off the Polish military depot at Westerplatte on the morning of 1 September. She opened fire on the base in Westerplatte, firing the first shots of World War II. The initial German attack was repulsed, leading to heavy fighting that Schleswig-Holstein supported for the next week, and culminating in the Polish garrison's surrender on 7 September. Later that month, Schlesien joined her sister in bombarding Polish positions along the coast, including the Hel Fortified Area. The ships returned to training duties after the Polish campaign, and in early 1940, Schlesien was used as an icebreaker in the Baltic Sea.

Schleswig-Holstein and Schlesien then participated in the occupation of Denmark and invasion of Norway, respectively, in April 1940. Neither vessel saw action during the operations. Afterward, Schleswig-Holstein was again removed from front-line service and used as a training ship, while Schlesien resumed her ice-breaking duties. In March 1941, Schlesien escorted mine-layers in the Baltic. After returning from this operation at the end of the month, she became a stationary training ship in Gotenhafen. Schleswig-Holstein was briefly reactivated in early 1942 for ice-breaker service in the Baltic, and in May she accidentally collided with a shipwreck in the Gulf of Riga, forcing a return to Gotenhafen for repairs. The ship was thereafter reduced to training duties.

Hannover was broken up in Bremerhaven between 1944 and 1946. In mid-1944, Schlesien's and Schleswig-Holstein's anti-aircraft armament was considerably strengthened to allow them to be used as air defense ships in the port of Gotenhafen. Schleswig-Holstein was attacked by RAF bombers in December 1944, and although she was sunk in shallow water, her weapons could still be used. After a fire permanently disabled the ship, her crew was sent ashore to assist in the defense of Marienburg. Schlesien provided fire support for German troops in the vicinity of Gotenhafen between 15 and 21 March 1945. In April, Schlesien was moved to Swinemünde to restock her ammunition supply as well as evacuate 1,000 wounded soldiers from the front. On 3 May she struck a mine outside Swinemünde; the following day she was scuttled by her crew in shallow water. Both ships were broken up in situ after the war.
