= Anselan John Buchanan Stirling =

Royal Navy Admiral (1875–1936)

Admiral Anselan John Buchanan Stirling, CB (27 June 1875 – 7 April 1936) was a Royal Navy officer.

The son of Colonel J. S. Stirling, of Gargunnock, Stirlingshire, he was educated at the Royal Naval School before joining HMS Britannia as a cadet in 1889. Promoted to lieutenant in 1897, he was appointed to HMS Barfleur of the China Station in 1898. He was severely wounded in action during the Boxer Rebellion, for which he was granted a pension by order-in-council.

At the Battle of Jutland in 1916, Stirling commanded the 12th Destroyer Flotilla from the bridge of flotilla leader Faulknor. For his services during the battle, he was commended and appointed a CB.

He was Captain in Charge, Port Edgar from 1922 to 1924, Commodore in Charge, Hong Kong from 1924 to 1926, and Admiral Superintendent, Chatham Dockyard from 1927 until his retirement in 1931. He was promoted to admiral on the retired list shortly before his death in 1936.
