= HMS Maenad (1915) =

British M-Class destroyer, WW1

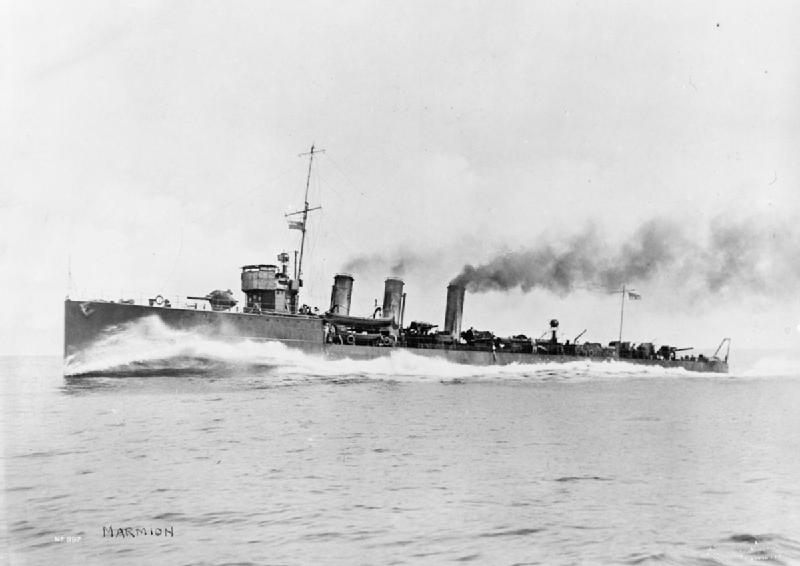
- Sister ship HMS Marmion

History

United Kingdom
- Name: HMS Maenad
- Namesake: Maenad
- Ordered: September 1914
- Builder: William Denny and Brothers, Dumbarton
- Yard number: 1030
- Laid down: 10 November 1914
- Launched: 10 August 1915
- Completed: 12 November 1915
- Out of service: 22 September 1921
- Fate: Sold to be broken up

General characteristics
- Class & type: Admiralty M-class destroyer
- Displacement: 994 long tons (1,010 t) (standard); 1,025 long tons (1,041 t) (full load)
- Length: 265 ft (80.8 m) (p.p.)
- Beam: 26 ft 7 in (8.1 m)
- Draught: 8 ft 7 in (2.6 m)
- Installed power: 3 Yarrow boilers, 25,000 shp (19,000 kW)
- Propulsion: Parsons steam turbines, 3 shafts
- Speed: 34 knots (39.1 mph; 63.0 km/h)
- Range: 2,280 nmi (4,220 km) at 17 kn (31 km/h)
- Complement: 80
- Armament: 3 × single QF 4-inch (102 mm) Mark IV guns; 1 × single 2-pdr 40 mm (2 in) AA gun; 2 × twin 21 in (533 mm) torpedo tubes

HMS Maenad was an Admiralty M-class destroyer which served with the Royal Navy during the First World War. The M class were an improvement on the previous L class, capable of higher speed. The vessel, launched in 1915, served in the Battle of Jutland in 1916, attacking both battleships and destroyers of the German High Seas Fleet. However, the vessel was notorious for undertaking a sharp manoeuvre which obstructed other destroyers in the fleet from attacking. Maenad also undertook anti-submarine patrols. In 1917, the ship mistakenly attacked the British submarine G12 thinking it was a German boat. The submarine escaped with damages. After the armistice that ended of the war, Maenad was placed in reserve until being sold to be broken up in Germany in 1921.

== Design and development ==
Maenad was one of sixteen Admiralty M-class destroyers ordered by the British Admiralty in September 1914 as part of the First War Construction Programme. The M class was an improved version of the earlier L-class destroyers, required to reach a higher speed in order to counter rumoured German fast destroyers. The remit was to have a maximum speed of 36 knots (67 km/h; 41 mph) and, although the eventual design did not achieve this, the greater performance was appreciated by the navy. It transpired that the German ships did not exist.

The destroyer had a length of 265 feet (80.8 m) between perpendiculars, with a beam of 26 ft 7 in (8.1 m) and a draught of 8 ft 7 in (2.6 m). Displacement was 994 long tons (1,010 t) standard and 1,025 long tons (1,041 t) full load. Power was provided by three Yarrow boilers feeding Parsons steam turbines rated at 25,000 shaft horsepower (19,000 kW) and driving three shafts, to give a design speed of 34 kn (63 km/h; 39 mph). Three funnels were fitted. A total of 268 long tons (272 t) of oil could be carried, including 40 long tons (41 t) in tanks used at times of peace, giving a range of 2,280 nautical miles (4,220 km; 2,620 mi) at 17 knots (31 km/h; 20 mph).

Armament consisted of three single QF 4-inch (102 mm) Mk IV guns on the ship's centreline, with one on the forecastle, one aft on a raised platform and one between the middle and aft funnels on a bandstand. Torpedo armament consisted of two twin mounts for 21 in (533 mm) torpedoes. A single QF 2-pounder 40 mm (1.6 in) "pom-pom" anti-aircraft gun was mounted between the torpedo tubes. After February 1916, for anti-submarine warfare, Maenad was equipped with two chutes for depth charges. The number of depth charges carried increased as the war progressed. On 12 July 1917, the destroyer was fitted with a kite balloon to spot submarines. The ship had a complement of 80 officers and ratings.

== Construction and career ==
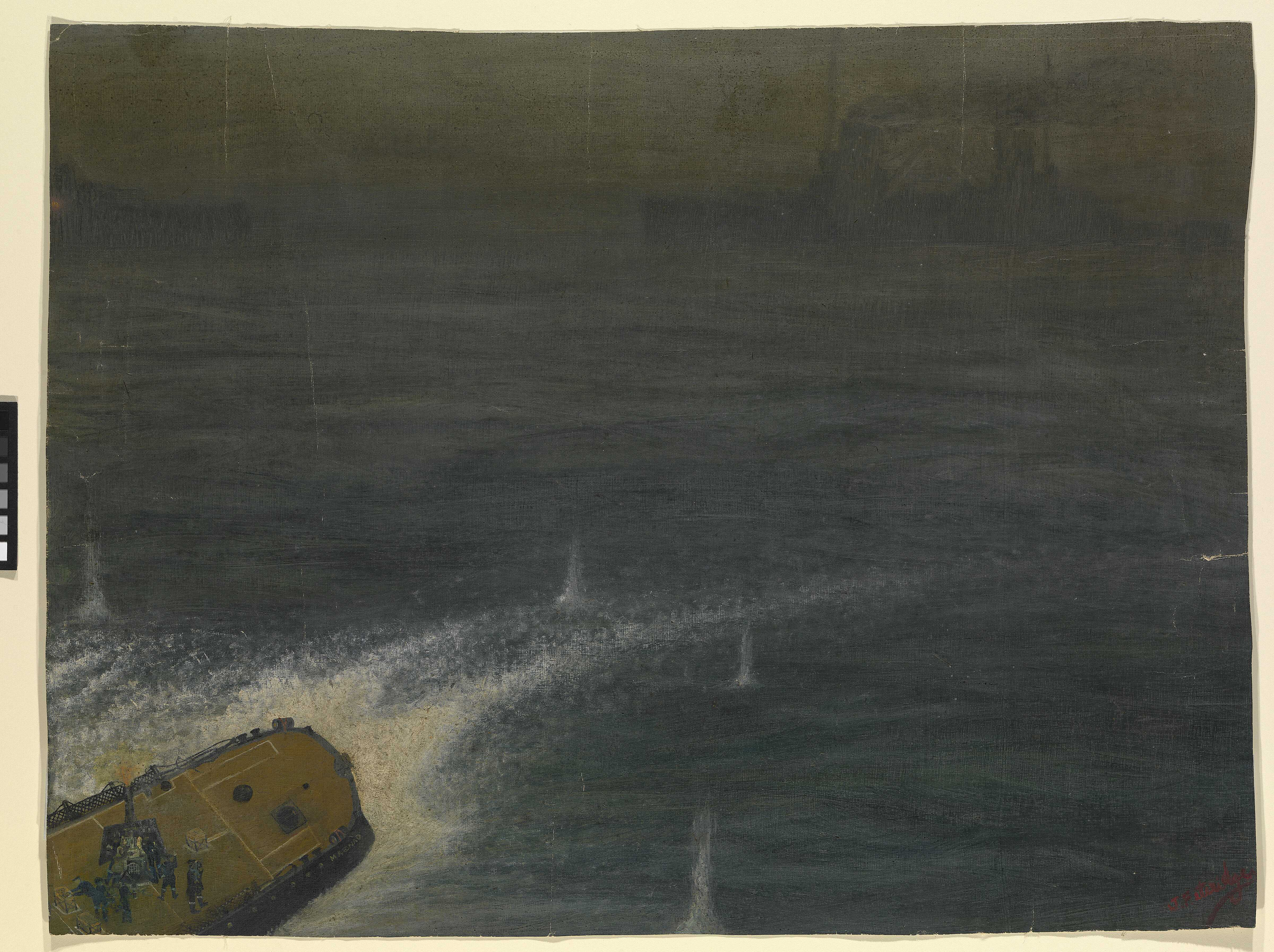
Maenad (in the foreground) at the Battle of Jutland

Laid down by William Denny and Brothers of Dumbarton at their shipyard on 10 November 1914 with the yard number 1030, Maenad was launched on 10 August the following year and completed on 12 November. The ship was named after the maenads, the female followers of Dionysus. The vessel was deployed as part of the Grand Fleet, joining the Twelfth Destroyer Flotilla.

On 30 May 1916, the destroyer sailed as part of the flotilla to confront the German High Seas Fleet in what would be the Battle of Jutland. The flotilla formed behind the First Battle Squadron and in the early morning of 1 June encountered the Kaiser-class dreadnought battleships of the III Battle Squadron. Leading the Second Division, Maenad fired a single torpedo at long range, and then steered away from the rest of the flotilla and unleashed two torpedoes, one of which was claimed to hit and caused an explosion on the fourth ship of the line. However, the German Navy recorded no loss and instead it is likely that the manoeuvre restricted the ability of the destroyers following to launch their own torpedoes. Maenad also joined in attacks against German torpedo boats, although these too did not lead to any ships being sunk. However, the vessel did manage to rescue some survivors from the destroyer Fortune, which had been sunk during the melee. After the battle, it is likely that many of the other destroyer captains mentioned Maenad in less than favorable terms for obstructing their ability to attack the German fleet.

On 22 November, the Twelfth Destroyer Flotilla took part in exercises under the dreadnought battleship Iron Duke, the last time that the fleet was commanded by Admiral John Jellicoe. Maenad subsequently served in anti-submarine patrols. These were occasionally successful at scaring off attacking submarines but often, as in the case of the merchant ship SS Buffalo, only after they had sunk their target. One attack that was reported as leading to the destruction of an enemy submarine on 15 March 1917 was later found out to be against the British submarine G12, which escaped with holes created by the destroyer's gun but no more damage.

After the Armistice of 11 November 1918 that ended the war, the Royal Navy returned to a peacetime level of strength and both the number of ships and personnel needed to be reduced to save money. Maenad was initially retired from active service and placed in reserve at Devonport. The destroyer was decommissioned and, on 22 September 1921, was sold, along with sister ship Magic, to G Cohen to be broken up in Germany.

== Pennant numbers ==
Pennant number	Date
HA7	August 1915
G26	January 1917
G27	January 1918
GA8	September 1918
G23	January 1919
