= Royal Navy during the First World War =

Royal Navy
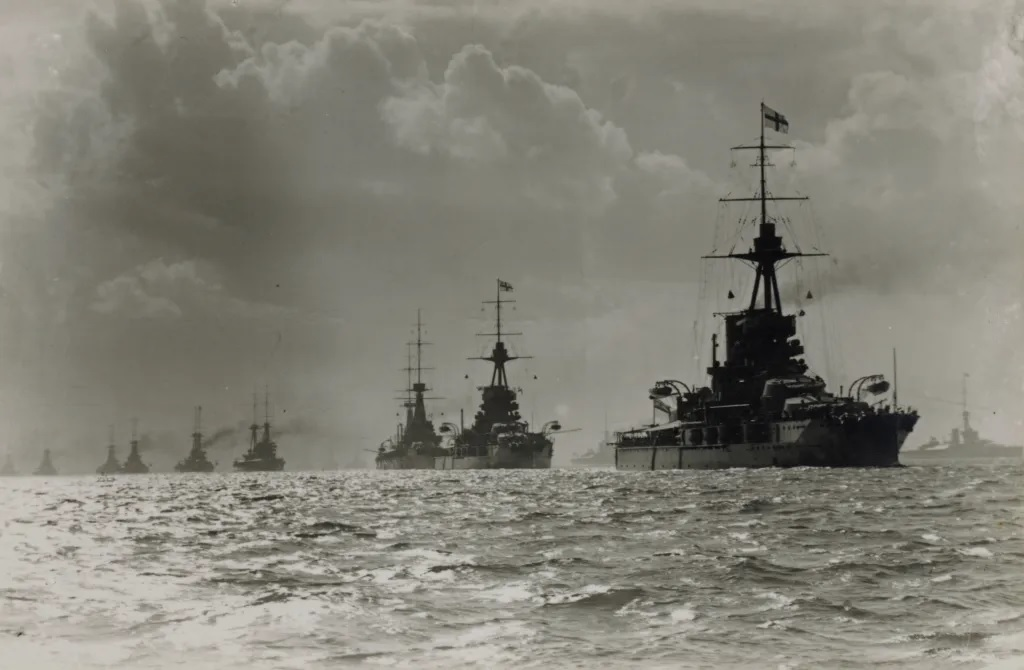
- HMS Iron Duke leads HMS Marlborough and other dreadnoughts of the Grand Fleet
- Service branches: Royal Marines; Fleet Air Arm
- Headquarters: Admiralty, London

Leadership
- First Lord of the Admiralty: Winston Churchill; Arthur Balfour; Edward Carson; Eric Geddes
- First Sea Lord: Prince Louis of Battenberg; John Fisher; Henry Jackson; John Jellicoe

Personnel
- Active personnel: 263,200 (November 1918)
- Reserve personnel: 129,950 (November 1918)

The Royal Navy during the First World War entered the conflict as the world's most powerful fleet, maintaining British naval supremacy since the victory at Trafalgar in 1805. However, the war brought unprecedented challenges and setbacks for the Royal Navy. At the pivotal Battle of Jutland in 1916, the Navy suffered heavy casualties, shaking confidence in its unassailable dominance. The Royal Navy also faced serious difficulties countering the German U-boat threat, leading to heavy shipping losses and a critical failure to provide adequate convoys and escorts in the war’s early years. Strategic ambitions were further frustrated by the unsuccessful Dardanelles Campaign of 1915, an attempt to force open a sea route to Russia which ended in failure and heavy losses. Meanwhile, the conflict saw the advent of the airplane in naval warfare, introducing new reconnaissance and combat roles that began to reshape naval strategy and operations.

== Background ==
At the beginning of the twentieth century, the Royal Navy was at the height of its power. The French Navy had not been a threat for years, Russia had suffered a crushing defeat against the Japanese at Tsushima in 1905, and the United States Navy was insignificant. However, German shipbuilding plans were seen as a challenge to British supremacy and led to a naval arms race. As relations with Germany deteriorated, Britain joined the Entente Cordiale. In the meantime, Admiral John 'Jackie' Fisher carried out a series of radical reforms designed to transform the Royal Navy into a state-of-the-art naval force. These included the introduction of submarines, steam-powered turbines, a switch from coal to oil, improved torpedoes and a revised training system. In addition, pay was increased and corporal punishment was reduced to a minimum.

== History ==
=== 1914 ===
After the outbreak of war, the Royal Navy immediately began to establish a blockade along the German North Sea coast. This was intended to disrupt Germany's maritime traffic and trade. In the Mediterranean, the Royal Navy suffered its first strategic defeat when the German Mediterranean Division (battlecruiser Goeben and light cruiser Breslau) managed to escape the British and reach the Dardanelles unscathed. The first major battle took place off Heligoland on August 28 and ended with a victory for the Royal Navy. Further battles followed off Texel and Yarmouth, which the British were also able to win. Nevertheless, the situation developed to the disadvantage of the British. On 22 September, three cruisers were sunk by a German submarine and a month later the battleship Audacious sank due to a naval mine explosion. On 1 November, the British suffered their first major defeat in 100 years in the Battle of Coronel. The British Admiralty responded by sending a fleet under the command of Admiral Doveton Sturdee to pursue the German ships. This led to the Battle of the Falkland Islands on 8 December, in which the Royal Navy destroyed the German ships and regained control of the southern Atlantic. To maintain the last open supply route to Russia, the Royal Navy was ordered to conduct a show of force at the Dardanelles in November.

=== 1915 ===
At the beginning of the year, the Royal Navy suffered another loss with the sinking of the pre-dreadnought, Formidable. Following the German strategy of provoking the Grand Fleet to leave using small-scale attacks, another clash took place off Dogger Bank on 24 January. Although the British were able to sink the cruiser Blücher, the battle ended without a clear winner. Together with the declaration of unrestricted submarine warfare, there were further attempts to capture the straits in the Dardanelles, but with no clear result. The main attack on the Dardanelles took place in March but had to be aborted with the loss of three battleships. Further attacks followed in May, but these resulted in the loss of three more battleships. Further attacks were considered, but due to differences of opinion and the increased danger from German U-boats, all offensive operations were suspended until December. Despite the German U-boat campaign, the year 1915 ended without the Germans gaining a decisive advantage over the Royal Navy.

=== 1916 ===
At the outset of the war, the Royal Navy enjoyed a numerical superiority of 3.5:1 in submarines. However, by the middle of the year, the number of German U-boats had increased to 134, while the British side had only 90. Up to the beginning of the Battle of Jutland in June, war operations in the North Sea consisted solely of patrol duty and the laying of own and clearing of enemy sea mines.

In the early morning of 31 May, Admiral Franz von Hipper was sent north along the Danish coast with five battlecruisers, while the High Seas Fleet, under the command of Admiral Reinhard Scheer, consisting of 24 battleships, followed him 80 kilometres (43 nmi; 50 mi) further south. The two German formations also included eleven small cruisers and 63 destroyers. The British Grand Fleet, which was able to decode the German radio messages, was already at sea and steamed eastwards in two divisions. The southern fleet under Admiral David Beatty consisted of six battlecruisers and four battleships. One hundred and twelve kilometres (60 nmi; 70 mi) further north was the main force of three battlecruisers and 24 battleships under the command of Admiral John Jellicoe. In addition, the two British formations included 34 light cruisers and 80 destroyers. At 15:25, the battlecruiser squadrons of Hipper and Beatty sighted each other. Hipper changed course and steamed south to close the gap to the High Seas Fleet. Beatty also turned round. The two forces fought an hour-long duel on a parallel course, which the Germans won by sinking the battlecruisers Indefatigable and Queen Mary. When Scheer's main fleet came into view, Beatty turned northwards. Both German groups followed. This soon brought them within range of Jellicoe's fleet, which was travelling in a south-easterly direction. As the two main fleets approached each other, Jellicoe turned eastwards to get between the Germans and the Danish coast. The main battle began around 18.00 hours. Hipper's flagship, Lützow, was put out of action and the British Invincible sunk. As the British fleets were crossing the T of the German vanguard Scheer turned to the south-west under the cover of a smoke screen and torpedo attacks from destroyers. The fire continued until dark. The British now had a clear advantage as they were between the German High Seas Fleet and their base. At about 22:00, however, Scheer turned his ships to the southeast and began to pick his way through the British light forces in the rear of Jellicoe's line. In a confusing four-hour night battle, the German ships broke through and escaped until morning. In this action, the Germans lost the heavily damaged Lützow and the battleship Pommern. The British Grand Fleet then returned to its bases. On 16 August, there was another clash between the Royal Navy and the High Seas Fleet. After a short battle with only minor damage on both sides, the Germans withdrew to Wilhelmshaven. This was the last time that the German fleet made such a long advance northwards. At the same time, the Admiralty decided not to conduct any further naval operations south of 55° 30' North due to the danger of mines and submarines. In late 1916, the German High Command decided to once again attack the British trade routes on the world's oceans with merchant destroyers. Until early 1917, the Royal Navy tried in vain to find and stop these German ships.

=== 1917 ===
As the High Seas Fleet did not embark on any further major operations, the Royal Navy's task was limited to fighting the German U-boats and laying and clearing mines. At the end of January, following a lengthy discussion at a naval conference in London, it was decided that all British battleships in the Mediterranean, except for Lord Nelson and Agamemnon, should be called home to provide crews for the destroyers and light cruisers that were to be completed in the year. Between March and October, there were individual skirmishes, which finally ended with the second naval battle near Helgoland; the battle ended in a draw. At the beginning of the year, the German High Command had begun to resume unrestricted submarine warfare. By April, losses had increased to 545,282 tonnes of cargo. The Admiralty estimated that at this level, the war would end in defeat for Great Britain by November. To avert this danger, the convoy system was introduced in the same month. By the end of the year, this had reduced losses to 253,087 tonnes. To be able to take action against the German U-boats in the English Channel, the Royal Navy made several unsuccessful attempts to destroy the heavy coastal batteries on the coast of Flanders in May and June. Despite this failure, the British succeeded in stopping the renewed movements of the German merchant navy off Flanders in the summer.

=== 1918 ===
In April, the Royal Navy raided Zeebrugge in another unsuccessful attempt to stop the German U-boats in Flanders. Apart from the raid on Kattegat in April, the Tondern raid in July, and the bombing of Durrës in October, there were no major actions. Most of the fighting took place between individual ships, with the Royal Navy sinking 30 German submarines by October. On 9 and 10 November, the Royal Navy lost the last two ships of the war, the pre-dreadnought Britannia and the minesweeper Ascot.

== Aftermath ==
The victory over Germany in 1918, which was achieved at considerable human cost, presented the naval forces with as many challenges as it solved. Until 1914, the Two Power Standard applied, which set the strength of the Royal Navy at twice that of the next two largest naval forces. However, the war had brought the naval ambitions of the United States and the Empire of Japan to the fore, so that a return to this former two-power standard was no longer possible. The conflict with the German U-boats had created a deep alliance between the British and the US, previously seen as potential rivals for naval supremacy. It became clear that the Royal Navy would not have been able to win the war without the support of the United States. The Royal Navy's losses during the war totalled around 40,000, including 34,600 killed and 5,100 wounded. In addition, there were 1,250 prisoners of war. In 1914, the Royal Navy consisted of three fleets. The Grand Fleet, the Channel Fleet and the Mediterranean Fleet. Of these, the Grand Fleet was the largest, with 29 battleships (eight of which were King Edward VII class) and four battlecruisers. The Channel Fleet had 14 battleships and the Mediterranean Fleet consisted of three battlecruisers and eight cruisers. In total, the Royal Navy had 622 ships at the beginning of the war. By November 1918, the number had risen to over 1,354, with losses totalling 254 ships.

== Command, supervision and organisation ==
During the First World War, the administration of the Royal Navy was centrally controlled by the Board of Admiralty, which consisted of nine members, each with defined responsibilities. The First Lord of the Admiralty was the senior government representative for all naval matters, acting as the political head of the board and serving as the main link between the government and the Royal Navy. The First Sea Lord was the senior naval member, responsible for the overall conduct of the war and the strategic distribution of the fleet, as well as advising the government on naval matters. The Second Sea Lord handled all personnel affairs, including the recruitment and training of seamen, Royal Marines, medical personnel, and various officers, as well as maintaining discipline throughout the service. The Third Sea Lord, also known as the Controller, was in charge of all material aspects of the fleet, including the design, construction, and outfitting of ships, machinery, naval guns, aircraft, and dock facilities. This role included the preparation of cost estimates for new construction, and the supervision of several departments, such as Naval Construction, Engineering, Ordnance, Equipment, the Air Department, and the Admiralty Compass Observatory.

The Fourth Sea Lord was responsible for logistics, which covered the provision and management of pay, fuel, rations, uniforms, decorations, stores, detention barracks, and issues relating to deserters, collisions, and salvage operations. Civilian oversight was provided by the Civil Lord, who managed land purchases, naval buildings, and staff, and the Additional Civil Lord, who acted as general manager for contracts and procurement, overseeing the organisation of shipyards and the commercial aspects of ship construction and repair. Financial matters, including estimates and proposals for new or exceptional expenditure, were handled by the Parliamentary Permanent Secretary, while general administration and Admiralty correspondence fell under the remit of the Permanent Secretary, a powerful civil servant who headed the Admiralty Secretariat.

The Admiralty, based in London, exercised centralised command over both shore establishments and fleet commands, setting policy, overseeing training, and directing the supply chain. The advent of wireless communication and advances in signals intelligence significantly improved the Admiralty’s ability to manage naval operations, providing rapid worldwide communication and centralised intelligence gathering. This development allowed the Admiralty to become the logical centre for strategic control. However, this centralisation sometimes led to over-interference in operational matters, which could have adverse consequences, as demonstrated by the loss of the South America Squadron in 1914 and mishandling of intelligence during the Battle of Jutland in 1916.

The structure of the Board of Admiralty was fluid during the war. In January 1917, a Fifth Sea Lord position was established to lead Naval Air Services, reflecting the increasing importance of naval aviation. The same year saw a reorganisation that increased the representation of the Naval Staff and separated the Controller’s role from the Third Sea Lord. This change was temporary, as the Controller post was dissolved in June 1918, and the Third Sea Lord resumed full responsibilities. Other temporary additions included a Deputy First Sea Lord in September 1917 and three more Civil Lords in January 1918, though these positions were abolished soon after the end of the war.

In terms of staff structure, the Admiralty established the Admiralty War Staff in 1912 as an advisory body to prepare war plans and gather intelligence. Initially composed of divisions for Intelligence, Mobilisation, and Operations, it was headed by a Chief of Staff under the First Sea Lord’s supervision. With the outbreak of war, additional divisions were created, such as the Trade Division to manage the blockade of Germany and protect British shipping, and later the Anti-Submarine Division and Signals Section. The staff grew in size and influence throughout the war, and in May 1917, its status was elevated and it was renamed the Naval Staff, with the First Sea Lord as Chief of Naval Staff (CNS), moving the body from an advisory role to an executive one. The staff chiefs, now Deputy Chief (DCNS) and Assistant Chief (ACNS) of Naval Staff, both became board members. The Naval Staff was further subdivided into specialised divisions, with those responsible for home waters reporting to the DCNS and those focused on trade protection reporting to the ACNS. Intelligence and training reported directly to the First Sea Lord, while foreign operations reported to the Deputy First Sea Lord.

== Units ==
By the onset of the war, the overwhelming majority—approximately eighty percent—of the Royal Navy’s strength was concentrated in home waters, a significant shift from earlier years when substantial forces had been stationed in the Mediterranean and Far East. Fleet organisation was also shaped by the commissioning of new ships, as modern vessels entering service displaced older ones, which were moved into reserve rather than increasing the overall fleet size. This meant the actual composition of squadrons and flotillas was in continual flux, but certain broad organisational principles can be outlined. In British home waters, all ships fit for war service, regardless of age or type, were attached to one of the Home Fleets under the supreme command of the Commander-in-Chief, Home Fleets, an admiral of acting or full rank.

The Home Fleets were divided into three: the First Fleet, kept in a state of instant readiness with full crews and termed “in full commission”; the Second Fleet, maintained with nucleus crews (about half the normal complement, though with a strong representation of skilled ratings) and placed in “active commission,” ready to be brought up to full strength at short notice from naval depots and training establishments; and the Third Fleet, in “reserve commission,” made up of older vessels with only a fifth of their crew on board, requiring a Royal Proclamation to call up reservists in an emergency, except for one battle squadron that could be mobilised immediately using the Immediate Reserve.

Within the First Fleet, the primary fighting strength consisted of four battle squadrons—each nominally with eight battleships, except the Gibraltar-based Fourth Squadron, which had only four. These squadrons tended to group ships of similar type, though rapid developments in naval architecture made true homogeneity difficult. Each battle squadron was led by a vice-admiral, with a rear-admiral as second-in-command, except for the Fourth Squadron. The Commander-in-Chief’s flagship did not belong to any squadron and was considered “outside the line.” The First Fleet also included five cruiser squadrons: the First Battle Cruiser Squadron (super-dreadnoughts), the Second, Third, and Fourth Cruiser Squadrons (armoured cruisers), and the First Light Cruiser Squadron (protected cruisers). Command of these squadrons varied, with commodores leading light cruisers and rear-admirals commanding the others. The Fourth Cruiser Squadron, stationed in the West Indies, was notable for its role in the advanced training of young sailors.

Supporting the capital ships were four mine-sweeping gunboats and four destroyer flotillas, each consisting of twenty turbine-driven, oil-burning destroyers built according to specific annual programmes. Each flotilla was supported by a depot ship and a flotilla cruiser, all commanded by a commodore designated as Commodore (T) in Command of Destroyer Flotillas of the First Fleet. The Second Fleet consisted principally of the Fifth and Sixth Battle Squadrons, each with eight ships, and Fifth and Sixth Cruiser Squadrons. The composition and deployment of these ships were more variable, with units often dispersed among the key naval bases at the Nore, Portsmouth, and Devonport rather than grouped in squadrons. The Second Fleet also featured significant torpedo-craft forces, including two destroyer flotillas, two mixed destroyer and torpedo-boat flotillas, and seven submarine flotillas. These patrol flotillas were under the Admiral of Patrols at the Admiralty, with submarine flotillas commanded by a commodore and manned by full and relief crews.

Outside home waters, the Royal Navy’s presence had been reduced in some traditional stations but maintained a significant, though more focused, presence elsewhere. In the Mediterranean, the force consisted of battle cruisers, armoured and light cruisers, and destroyers, with plans for reinforcement as the naval balance in the region changed, particularly in response to Italian and Austrian naval expansion. By 1915, a squadron of eight battleships was to be stationed there, which would, in turn, affect the distribution of other vessels.In the Pacific and other overseas areas, the Royal Navy maintained squadrons on the China Station (under a vice-admiral), the East Indies (rear-admiral), New Zealand (captain), Cape of Good Hope (rear-admiral), West Coast of Africa (commander), South-East Coast of America (captain), and West Coast of America (captain). Each of these squadrons or stations varied in size and composition, tailored to local requirements and the rank of the commanding officer.

== Recruitment and training ==
In 1914, the Royal Navy had 139,045 men, including some Royal Marines and the Coastguard, bringing the total to 146,047. At the end of the war in November 1918, 407,316 men and women were serving in the Royal Navy. The reasons for joining the Navy were sometimes practical, sometimes romantic. One important factor that remained a major incentive until the 1930s was poverty and hunger.

=== Officers ===
Prior to the First World War, only those whose parents could afford the high fees for training naval cadets on HMS Britannia, the officer training ship, or at the Royal Navy colleges at Dartmouth and Osborne, founded in 1905, could join the Royal Navy. Tuition at Osborne and Dartmouth was on a par with many of the best public schools, but unlike the public schools, the naval schools did not offer scholarships. Cadets were accepted into the navy at the age of twelve or thirteen after a physical examination, an interview and a written test. The health test consisted of walking barefoot across a wet floor (to detect any flat feet) and looking at different coloured pieces of glass to detect colour blindness. Before the interview, applicants had to write an essay on a topic set by the examination board. Due to the high tuition fees and the individual interview, almost all officers during the war came from the upper middle class and rural gentry. The training lasted a total of four years and was extremely tough. The instructors emphasised physical training, discipline and practical seamanship. After completing his training on land, a six-month cruise on a training ship followed, after which the cadet transferred to a regular warship as an ensign. He then spent 28 months there and, after convincing his superiors of his abilities, was appointed a temporary sub-lieutenant. If he passed further examinations in the fields of gunnery, torpedoes and technology at a later date, he was promoted to full sub-lieutenant. After serving at sea for one to three years, officers could volunteer for selection as specialists in navigation, armoury or engineering. Those who were selected first completed a course of study at the Royal Naval College in Greenwich, where they reviewed and expanded their knowledge in the scientific fields relevant to them. They then attended a course at the training centres in Portsmouth or Devonport. After passing the qualification course, they were awarded the rank of Lieutenant (N), (G), (T) or (E). In addition to this standard procedure, there were three other methods by which the Navy recruited and trained its officers. The first, known as the "special entry" system, was introduced in 1913. Cadets were accepted from the public schools between the ages of 17 and 18 and were commissioned as lieutenants after undergoing modified training. This system was therefore known as 'direct entry' and was increasingly applied to the Royal Marines, whose officers were originally to undergo training at Osborne and Dartmouth. Eventually the Navy obtained some of its officers through the promotion of men from the enlisted ranks; however, in 1914 this only applied to the Executive and Engineer Divisions. Lieutenants were automatically promoted to the rank of first lieutenant if they had spent eight years in the lower rank. Promotion to commander and captain was by selection. The next step, promotion to flag officer, was by seniority, with any vacancy being automatically filled by the captain at the top of that rank. Promotion to Admiral of the Fleet was finally made by the monarch.

=== Ratings ===
Young men joined the navy between the ages of 15 and 16 to undergo training as a seaman. They had to be of very good character and had to have the written consent of their parents or guardian on the form provided by the recruiting officer. Men who had been in prisons or reformatories were not accepted. Exceptions were made for men who had attended an industrial school, provided they were of very good character and could produce a special authorisation from the Captain of Inspection of the Boys' Training Ships. New recruits received their initial training on board one of the training ships in Portsmouth Devonport or Portland. Here they learnt how to swim, clean the ship, wear and care for their uniforms and acquire basic seamanship skills. As at the naval schools, the training was strict and demanding, sometimes even brutal. Training continued in all weathers. Rations were poor, punishments severe and lost wages were common Applicants for the job of machinist had to be between 21 and 28 years old and competent professionals in one of the following trades: Machinist or Turner, Coppersmith and Boilermaker. Occasionally, some modellers and foundrymen were also accepted. Applicants were tested in the following areas before being accepted: Reading and writing, knowing the four basic arithmetic operations, being generally familiar with the names and uses of the various parts of the ship's propulsion system, understanding the use and operation of the steam and water gauges and other boiler fittings, knowing how to determine the density and height of the water in the boilers, understanding the operation of the machinery and knowing what to do in the event of water entering the cylinders. They also had to be familiar with what to do in the event of an accident in the machine room. Candidates for the profession of electrician also had to be between 21 and 28 years old, have worked in a skilled trade, have a good command of fractions and have at least five years' professional experience.

With the introduction of conscription, the male population was liable to be called up for the British Army. One way to avoid this was to voluntarily enlist in the Royal Navy, as ratings were exempt from being conscripted. Whilst the terms of engagement for most Branches and specialities were twelve years of Continuous Engagement from the age of 18 onwards, it became possible to enlist for the duration of hostilities only. Since 1903, special service, of five years with the fleet, then seven with the Royal Fleet Reserve, were made available, to boost recruiting. (Note: 1903, the Special Service Engagements (SS) was introduced for 5 years service in the RN and 7 in the Royal Fleet Reserve Engagements & Time to Serve in Royal Navy) Those enlisting for the Royal Naval Air Service were to serve four years with the fleet, and four with the reserves, the same as their contemporaries in the Military Wing of the Royal Flying Corps.

==== Pay and promotion ====
Flag officer
| Pay | Annual |
|---|---|
| Admiral of the Fleet | £2,190 |
| Admiral | £1,825 |
| Viceadmiral | £1460 |
| Rear admiral | £1,095 |

Senior officer
| Pay | Annual |
|---|---|
| Commodore | £1,095 |
| Fleet captain | £1,095 |
| Captain | £410/12/6 to £602/5/– |
| Senior captain | £511 |
| Commander | £401 |
| Lieutenant | £182/10/– to £292 |
| Mate | £146 |
| Sublieutenant | £91/5/– |
| Midshipman | £/31/18/9 |

Non-commissioned officers and ratings
| Pay | Upon entering service | After 3 Years | After 6 Years |
|---|---|---|---|
| Chief Petty Officer | 3/8 | 4/– | 4/4 |
| Petty Officer | 3/– | 3/2 | 3/4 |
| Leading Seaman | 2/2 | 2/4 | |
| Able Seaman | 1/8 | | 1/11 |
| Ordinary Seaman | 1/3 | | |

== Diet ==
Daily life for sailors revolved around messes—groups of men who ate together at long wooden tables, which could be stowed away when not in use. Meals were communal, with messmates seated on benches, and often shared space with the ship’s guns, reflecting the utilitarian design of warships. Food supply for the lower deck was primarily managed through a system known as canteen messing. The Navy issued a set of basic staples to each mess, which included bread, meat (fresh or preserved), fresh vegetables, sugar, tea, chocolate, and condensed milk. Beyond these essentials, the mess was granted a daily messing allowance of four pence per man, which could be pooled to purchase supplementary items such as beans, peas, cabbage, turnips, onions, bacon, and tinned fruit. Messmates collectively decided how their allowance would be spent, often guided by the leading hand, and could make purchases from the paymaster’s stores or the ship’s canteen. If the mess spent less than their collective allowance, the surplus was credited to each man; however, overspending was common and would result in deductions from their pay. Ratings could also make personal purchases at the canteen, the cost of which was charged to their monthly pay.

The organization of meals within each mess was the responsibility of the caterer, a position that required careful management to balance the mess’s budget and ensure fair distribution. The day-to-day food preparation fell to one or two cooks-of-the-day, chosen in rotation from the members of the mess. These individuals were not professional cooks; their tasks included collecting rations, preparing ingredients, setting the table, brewing tea or cocoa, collecting the daily ration of grog (alcoholic spirits), and serving and cleaning up after meals. The ship’s cooks and cook’s mates were responsible only for the actual cooking in the galley, typically boiling water and placing prepared dishes in the oven.

The daily ration for each sailor was standardized. It typically included one pound of bread (or a mix of bread and flour), half a pound of fresh meat, one pound of fresh vegetables, an eighth of a pint of spirits, four ounces of sugar, half an ounce of tea (or an equivalent amount of coffee or chocolate), three-quarters of an ounce of condensed milk, one ounce of jam, marmalade, or pickles, and preserved meat (four ounces) on designated days. Mustard, pepper, vinegar, and salt were provided as required. When soft bread was unavailable, hard biscuit or additional flour was issued as a substitute. If fresh meat and vegetables could not be supplied, alternatives were provided on a rotating basis. For example, salt pork could replace fresh meat, accompanied by split peas, celery seed, and potatoes; on preserved meat days, sailors received a ration of preserved meat, flour, suet, raisins or jam, and potatoes or rice.

There were also variations for shore establishments and men in cells. Men stationed ashore or on depot ships received fresh milk instead of condensed milk, and did not receive preserved meat weekly. Men held in cells were given a restricted diet, consisting mainly of biscuit, vegetables, tea, chocolate, and sugar, with allowances adjusted according to the severity of their punishment. Preparation of meals was often rudimentary, and the variety and quality of food depended heavily on the skill and ingenuity of the mess’s cooks-of-the-day. Typical dishes involved stews, pies, or simple combinations of meat and vegetables, with limited attention paid to puddings or desserts. The process was labor-intensive, with cooks-of-the-day responsible for collecting, preparing, and serving food, as well as cleaning up, often under time pressure and with minimal facilities.

Despite the rigid rationing system, there was some flexibility. For instance, salmon or rabbit could be substituted for preserved meat at certain meals, and condensed milk or fresh milk might be drawn in place of sugar or jam. The overall diet was monotonous but designed to provide the necessary calories and nutrition for sailors engaged in the physically demanding life at sea. While the system ensured that basic nutritional needs were met, the quality of food could vary widely, and the challenge of cooking and serving for large numbers under wartime conditions made the role of the mess and its caterers central to daily naval life.

== Fleet Air Arm ==
During the war the Royal Navy saw also the rise of the Fleet Air Arm. The Fleet Air Arm traces its origins to the establishment of the Royal Naval Air Service (RNAS) in 1912. The establishment of the RNAS marked the formal inception of naval aviation within the British military. Prior to the establishment of the RNAS, the Royal Navy had commenced investigations into the potential of aviation. The inaugural recorded flight from a British warship occurred in January 1912, when Lieutenant Charles Samson flew a Short S.27 biplane from a provisional platform on the battleship HMS Africa. This was subsequently repeated aboard HMS Hibernia.

On 1 July 1914, the Admiralty made the Naval Wing of the Royal Flying Corps part of the Military Branch of the Royal Navy, renamed as the Royal Naval Air Service. In its inaugural period, the RNAS was tasked with overseeing all aspects of naval aviation, encompassing shipborne aircraft, airships, and the establishment of shore-based air stations. Along with the Fleet Air Arm the concept of the aircraft carrier were developed. The RNAS began experimenting with launching aircraft from ships, leading to the development of the first aircraft carriers. HMS Hermes was among the earliest examples, designed to operate seaplanes and later conventional aircraft. These ships allowed the RNAS to project air power far beyond the range of land-based aircraft.

== Notes and citations ==
Notes

Citations
