= HMS Shark (1912) =

Acasta-class destroyer

Coordinates: 56°58′30″N 06°03′00″E

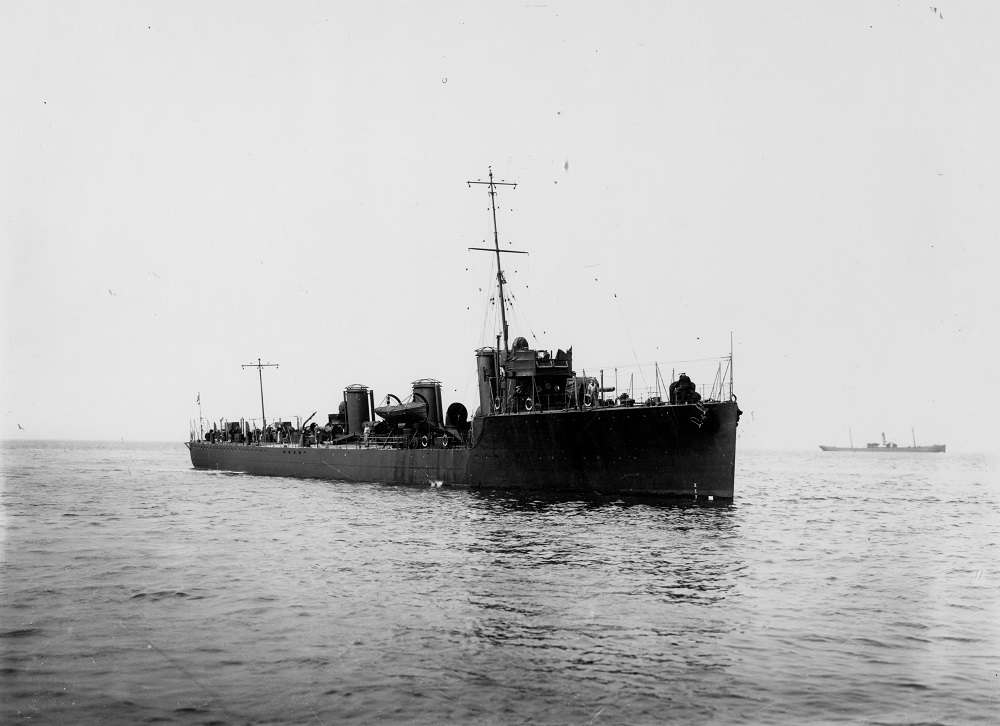
- HMS Shark

History

United Kingdom
- Name: HMS Shark
- Builder: Swan, Hunter & Wigham Richardson, Wallsend
- Launched: 30 July 1912
- Fate: Sunk, Battle of Jutland, 31 May 1916

General characteristics
- Class & type: Acasta-class destroyer
- Length: 267 ft 6 in (81.5 m)
- Beam: 27 ft 0 in (8.2 m)
- Draught: 10 ft 6 in (3.2 m)
- Propulsion: Yarrow-type water-tube boilers; Parsons steam turbines
- Speed: 29 knots (54 km/h; 33 mph)
- Armament: 3 × QF 4 in (101.6 mm) L/40 Mark IV guns, mounting P Mk. IX; 2 × single tubes for 21 in (533 mm) torpedoes

HMS Shark, was an Acasta-class destroyer built in 1912 for the Royal Navy. Shark was sunk during the Battle of Jutland on the evening of 31 May 1916.

== Design and construction ==
Under the 1911–1912 shipbuilding programme for the Royal Navy, the British Admiralty ordered 20 Acasta-class destroyers, with 12 to the standard Admiralty design and 8 more builder's specials, with detailed design left to the builders. Swan, Hunter & Wigham Richardson received an order for one destroyer, HMS Shark, to be built to the Admiralty design.

The Acastas were larger and more powerful than the Acorn-class destroyers ordered under the previous year's programme. Greater speed was wanted to match large fast destroyers building for foreign navies, while a larger radius of action was desired. The destroyers built to the Admiralty standard design were 267 feet 6 inches (81.5 m) long overall and 260 feet 0 inches (79.2 m) between perpendiculars, with a beam of 27 feet 0 inches (8.2 m) and a draught of 10 feet 5 inches (3.2 m). Displacement was 892 long tons (906 t) Normal and 1,072 long tons (1,089 t) Deep load. Four Yarrow boilers fed steam to direct drive Parsons steam turbines rated at 24,500 shaft horsepower (18,300 kW) and driving two shafts. This gave a speed of 29 knots (54 km/h; 33 mph). (Note: While the nominal speed of the Acastas at 29 knots was the same as the Acorns, this speed was required at full load displacement rather than the lighter displacements previously used. A trial speed of 29.5 knots (54.6 km/h; 33.9 mph) at full load corresponded to a speed of 32 knots (59 km/h; 37 mph) at the lighter loads previously specified.) Three funnels were fitted. The ship had an endurance of 1,540 nautical miles (2,850 km; 1,770 mi) at 15 knots (28 km/h; 17 mph).

Armament consisted of three 4-inch (102 mm) guns mounted on the ship's centreline, with one forward and two aft, with 120 rounds of ammunition carried per gun, together with two 21-inch (533 mm) torpedo tubes. Two reload torpedoes were carried. The ship had a crew of 73 officers and ratings.

Shark was laid down at Swan Hunter's Wallsend shipyard on 27 October 1911 and was launched on 30 July 1912. In 1913 the Admiralty decided to reclassify the Royal Navy's destroyers into alphabetical classes, with the Acasta class becoming the K class. New names were allocated to the ships of the K class, with the name Kestrel being reserved for Shark, but the ships were not renamed. (Note: It was considered unlucky to rename ships after they had been launched, which would also create considerable administrative problems. In addition, Winston Churchill, First Lord of the Admiralty noted that the names allocated to the Ks "are not good names".) Shark was completed in April 1913.

== Service ==
Following commissioning, as with the rest of her class, Shark joined the 4th Destroyer Flotilla based at Portsmouth. On the outbreak of the First World War in August 1914, the 4th Flotilla, including Shark, became part of the Grand Fleet based at Scapa Flow in Orkney.

=== German raid on Scarborough ===
On 15 December 1914, German battlecruisers, supported by the battleships of the main German High Seas Fleet set out on a raid against the coastal towns of Scarborough, Whitby and Hartlepool, with the intent of drawing out units of the British Grand Fleet, where they could be engaged by the battleships of the High Seas Fleet. The British, aware from radio intercepts that the Germans were planning a raid with their battlecruisers (but not that they were supported by the whole of the High Seas Fleet), sent out the battlecruiser squadron under Vice Admiral David Beatty with four battlecruisers and the Second Battle Squadron, commanded by Vice Admiral Sir George Warrender, with six battleships, to oppose the raid. Shark was one of seven destroyers that sailed in support of the British battlecruiser squadron. At 05:15 on 16 December, the lead ship of the British destroyers, Lynx, spotted a German destroyer, V155 (part of the screen of the High Seas Fleet) and set off with the other destroyers in pursuit of the German ship. In a brief exchange of fire, V155 hit both Lynx and Ambuscade, forcing both to break off. Soon afterwards, Shark and Hardy encountered the German light cruiser Hamburg. After Hardy was badly damaged by shells from Hamburg, Shark and the remaining British destroyers resumed station screening the British battlecruisers. They encountered five German destroyers at about 06:03, which they chased away, and at about 06:50 encountered the German cruiser Roon, screened by destroyers, and shadowed them, while reporting their position by radio, but when Shark attempted to lead her division in a torpedo attack against the German cruiser, the appearance of two more German cruisers, Stuttgart and Hamburg, and were forced to break off the attack with the German cruisers in pursuit, before losing contact with the Germans due to poor visibility.

=== The Battle of Jutland ===
During the Battle of Jutland, Shark was one of four destroyers from the 4th Flotilla assigned to cover the 3rd Battlecruiser Squadron. During the battle, at around 6 pm, Shark led an unsuccessful torpedo attack by the four destroyers on the German 2nd Scouting Group, with Shark firing two torpedoes. The other three destroyers escaped with little damage, but Shark was crippled by gunfire, having her fuel pipes and steering gear wrecked. The forecastle gun was completely blown away with most of its gun crew shortly before the captain, Commander Loftus Jones, declined an offer of assistance from the destroyer Acasta, as it would put Acasta in too much danger.

Soon afterwards the aft 4-inch gun was also destroyed and the bridge wrecked. Jones and three seamen continued working the midship gun, engaging nearby German destroyers and leading to the sinking of V48. The German destroyers closed on the ship and returned heavy fire, during which Jones lost a leg. Shortly before 7 pm he ordered the ship to be abandoned and around thirty of the crew got onto the rafts. Only seven were picked up six hours later by a Danish ship, but one died soon afterwards. Although there are reports that Jones went down with the ship, survivors told his wife that he was put onto a raft. In total, 86 men out of a crew of 92 were killed.

== Loss ==
At 7 pm, the destroyer was sunk by a torpedo launched by the German torpedo boat S54 and which hit her abreast of the aft funnel. In March 1917, Jones was gazetted with a posthumous Victoria Cross. The wrecksite is designated as a protected place under the Protection of Military Remains Act 1986.
