= SMS V48 =

German torpedo boat during WW I

Coordinates: 56°54′22″N 06°06′28″E

History

German Empire
- Name: V48
- Ordered: 1914 Mobilization orders
- Builder: AG Vulcan Stettin, Germany
- Launched: 6 August 1915
- Commissioned: 10 December 1915
- Fate: Sunk at the Battle of Jutland, 31 May 1916

General characteristics
- Class & type: V25-class torpedo boat
- Displacement: 1,188 t (1,169 long tons) deep load
- Length: 83.1 m (272 ft 8 in) oa
- Beam: 8.3 m (27 ft 3 in)
- Draft: 3.4 m (11 ft 2 in)
- Propulsion: 3 water tube boilers; Steam turbines, 2 shafts; 24,000 PS (24,000 shp; 18,000 kW)
- Speed: 33.5 knots (62.0 km/h; 38.6 mph)
- Range: 2,050 nmi (3,800 km; 2,360 mi) at 17 knots (31 km/h; 20 mph)
- Complement: 87 officers and sailors
- Armament: 3 × 8.8 cm (3.5 in) SK L/45 guns; 6 × 500 mm (20 in) torpedo tubes; 24 mines

SMS V48 was a 1913 Type Large Torpedo Boat (Großes Torpedoboot) of the Imperial German Navy during World War I, and the 24th ship of her class.

== Construction ==
Built by AG Vulcan Stettin shipyard, Germany, V48 was ordered on 22 April 1914, as part of the 1914 shipbuilding programme. She was launched on 6 August 1915 and commissioned on 10 December 1915. The "V" in V48 denotes the shipyard at which she was built.

V48 was 83.1 metres (272 ft 8 in) long overall and 82.3 metres (270 ft 0 in) between perpendiculars, with a beam of 8.3 metres (27 ft 3 in) and a draft of 3.4 metres (11 ft 2 in). Displacement was 924 tonnes (909 long tons) normal and 1,188 tonnes (1,169 long tons) deep load. Three oil-fired water-tube boilers fed steam to two sets of AEG-Vulcan steam turbines rated at 24,000 metric horsepower (24,000 shp; 18,000 kW), giving a speed of 33.5 knots (62.0 km/h; 38.6 mph). 338 tonnes (333 long tons) of fuel oil was carried, giving a range of 2,050 nautical miles (3,800 km; 2,360 mi) at 17 knots (31 km/h; 20 mph).

Armament originally consisted of three 8.8 cm SK L/45 naval guns in single mounts, together with six 50 cm (19.7 in) torpedo tubes with two fixed single tubes forward and 2 twin mounts aft. Up to 24 mines could be carried. In 1916 the 8.8 cm guns were replaced by three 10.5 cm SK L/45 naval guns. The ship had a complement of 87 officers and men.

== Service ==
V48 was assigned to the 3rd Flotilla, 6th Half-Flotilla when she participated in the Battle of Jutland. In this action, the 3rd Flotilla launched an unsuccessful torpedo attack against British battlecruisers, and after turning away the German destroyers exchanged fire with the damaged destroyer HMS Shark, with V48 receiving damage from the impact of one or two 4-inch (102 mm) shells, which disabled the German destroyer's machinery, forcing V48 to stop. An attempt by the German destroyer G42 to take V48 in tow was abandoned because of heavy fire from the British battleline. The battleship HMS Valiant later fired a 6-inch (152 mm) shell into her. She was eventually sunk by a 4-inch shell fired from an unidentified ship of the British 12th Destroyer Flotilla, and lost with 90 men killed in action.

The sole survivor was Hans Robert Tietje who spent 14 hours in the water before being picked up by a Danish fishing boat.
