= 12th Destroyer Flotilla =

- Active: (1915-1919), (1939-1943)
- Country: United Kingdom
- Branch: Royal Navy
- Size: Flotilla

Commanders
- First: Captain Herbert Meade

The British 12th Destroyer Flotilla, or Twelfth Destroyer Flotilla, was a naval formation of the Royal Navy from November 1915 to March 1919 and again from September 1939 to 2 July 1943.

== History ==
=== World War One ===
The flotilla was first formed in November 1915 and was assigned to the Grand Fleet. Between 31 May and 1 June 1916 it was present at the Battle of Jutland then commanded by Captain Anselan J. B. Stirling. It remained with the Grand Fleet until November 1918 and was disbanded in March 1919.

=== Second World War ===
In September 1939 the flotilla was re-established and allocated to the Western Approaches Command and stationed at Portland till December 1939 when it was reassigned to the Home Fleet till May 1941 when its ships were dispersed among other formations. It reformed again on 29 January 1943 as part of the Mediterranean Fleet and was part of forces covering the East Mediterranean area till 2 July 1943 when it was abolished.

== Administration ==
=== Captains (D) afloat 12th Destroyer Flotilla ===
Incomplete list of post holders included:

	Rank	Name	Term	Notes
Captain (D) afloat 12th Destroyer Flotilla
1	Captain	The Hon. Herbert Meade	8 December 1915– 19 April 1916	later Adm.
2	Captain	Anselan Stirling	20 April 1916 – 12 October 1918	commanded at Battle of Jutland, later Adm.
3	Captain	Rowland H. Bather	12 October 1918 – 24 November 1918	later Radm.
4	Captain	William S. Leveson-Gower	24 November 1918 – 1 January 1919	later Radm.

== Composition ==
Included:
(United Kingdom) , Western Approaches Command September 1939

12th Destroyer Flotilla

- HMS Exmouth (Leader)

Division 23

- HMS Eclipse
- HMS Electra

Division 24

- HMS Encounter
- HMS Escapade
- HMS Escort

== Sources ==
- Harley, Simon; Lovell, Tony. (2018) "Twelfth Destroyer Flotilla (Royal Navy) - The Dreadnought Project". www.dreadnoughtproject.org. Harley and Lovell, 29 May 2018. Retrieved 9 July 2018.
- Kindell, Don. (2012) "ROYAL NAVY SHIPS, SEPTEMBER 1939". naval-history.net. Gordon Smith.
- Watson, Dr Graham. (2015) Royal Navy Organisation and Ship Deployments 1900-1914". www.naval-history.net. G. Smith.
- Watson, Dr Graham. (2015) "Royal Navy Organisation and Ship Deployment, Inter-War Years 1919-1938". www.naval-history.net. Gordon Smith.
- Watson, Dr Graham. (2015) "Royal Navy Organisation in World War 2, 1939-1945". www.naval-history.net. Gordon Smith.
- Willmott, H. P. (2009). The Last Century of Sea Power, Volume 1: From Port Arthur to Chanak, 1894–1922. Bloomington, IN, USA: Indiana University Press. ISBN 0253003563.
