= German ship Köln =

Several naval ships of Germany were named Cöln or Köln after the city of Cologne, Germany (German: Köln):

- SMS Cöln (1909) (1911–1914), a Kolberg-class cruiser
- SMS Cöln (1916) (1918–1919), a Cöln-class cruiser
- German cruiser Köln (1930–1945), a Königsberg-class cruiser
- German frigate Köln (F220) (1961–1982), a F120 Köln-class frigate
- German frigate Köln (F211) (1984–2012), a F122 Bremen-class frigate
- German corvette Köln (F265), a Braunschweig-class corvette

== See also ==
- SMS Cöln
- SS Köln
