= SMS Dresden (1917) =

Light cruiser of the German Imperial Navy

Coordinates: 58.8811°N 3.1429°W

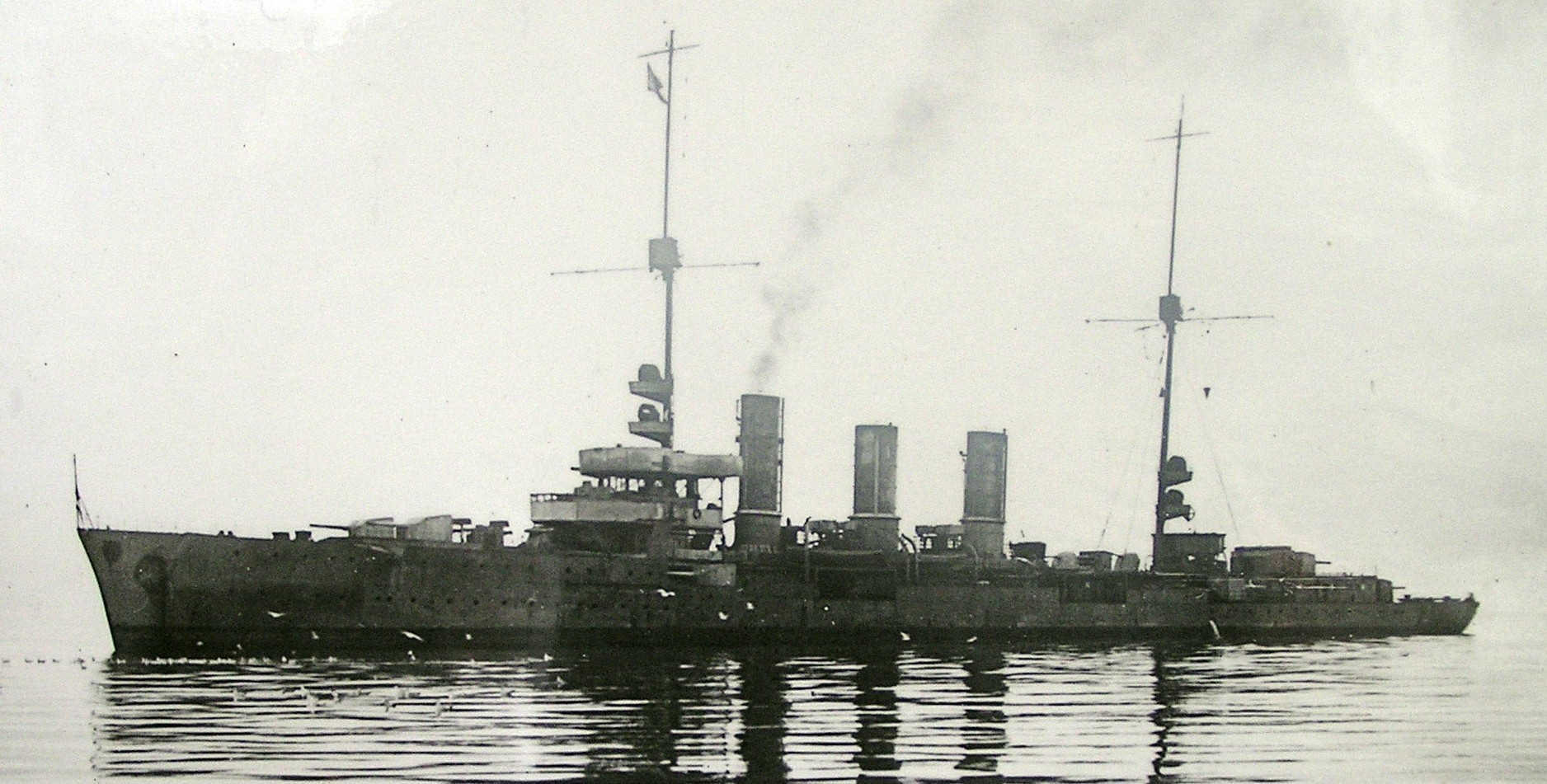
- SMS Dresden in Scapa Flow

History

German Empire
- Name: Dresden
- Namesake: Dresden
- Builder: Blohm und Voss
- Laid down: 1916
- Launched: 25 April 1917
- Commissioned: 28 March 1918
- Fate: Scuttled in Scapa Flow in 21 June 1919
- Notes: Wreck remains in Scapa Flow

General characteristics
- Class & type: Cöln-class cruiser
- Displacement: Normal: 5,620 t (5,530 long tons); Full load: 7,486 t (7,368 long tons)
- Length: 155.5 m (510 ft)
- Beam: 14.2 m (47 ft)
- Draft: 6.01 m (19.7 ft)
- Installed power: 31,000 shp (23,000 kW); 14 × water-tube boilers
- Propulsion: 2 × screw propellers; 2 × steam turbines
- Speed: 27.5 knots (50.9 km/h; 31.6 mph)
- Range: 5,400 nmi (10,000 km; 6,200 mi) at 12 kn (22 km/h; 14 mph)
- Complement: 17 officers; 542 enlisted men
- Armament: 8 × 15 cm (5.9 in) SK L/45 guns; 3 × 8.8 cm (3.5 in) SK L/45 AA guns; 4 × 60 cm (23.6 in) torpedo tubes; 200 mines
- Armor: Belt: 60 mm (2.4 in); Deck: 60 mm

SMS Dresden was the second and final ship of the Cöln class of light cruisers to be completed and commissioned in the Kaiserliche Marine (Imperial Navy). The ship was laid down in 1916 and launched on 25 April 1917; she was commissioned into the High Seas Fleet on 28 March 1918. She and her sister Cöln were the only two of her class to be completed; eight of her sisters were scrapped before they could be completed. The ships were an incremental improvement over the preceding Königsberg-class cruisers.

Dresden was commissioned into service with the High Seas Fleet eight months before the end of World War I; as a result, her service career was limited and she did not see action. She participated in a fleet operation to Norway to attack British convoys to Scandinavia, but they failed to locate any convoys and returned to port. Dresden was to have participated in a climactic sortie in the final days of the war, but a revolt in the fleet forced Admirals Reinhard Scheer and Franz von Hipper to cancel the operation. The ship was interned in Scapa Flow after the end of the war and scuttled with the fleet there on 21 June 1919, under orders from the fleet commander Rear Admiral Ludwig von Reuter.

== Design ==
In the first year after the start of World War I in July 1914, the German Kaiserliche Marine (Imperial Navy) suffered heavy losses among its light cruisers; by late 1915, the decision was made to begin construction on replacements. The navy was no longer constrained by the naval laws that had previously governed expenditures, and war funding was allocated for the construction of ten new vessels. Owing to the need to begin work as quickly as possible, only minor alterations were made to the preceding Königsberg class design, including the number of anti-aircraft guns and the location of the torpedo tubes.

Dresden was 155.5 meters (510 ft) long overall and had a beam of 14.2 m (47 ft) and a draft of 6.01 m (19.7 ft) forward. The displaced 5,620 t (5,530 long tons) normally and up to 7,486 t (7,368 long tons; 8,252 short tons) at full load. Her propulsion system consisted of two sets of steam turbines, which drove a pair of screw propellers. Steam was provided by eight coal-fired and six oil-fired Marine-type water-tube boilers. The boilers were ducted into three funnels amidships. The engines were rated to produce 31,000 shaft horsepower (23,000 kW) for a top speed of 27.5 kn (50.9 km/h; 31.6 mph) and a range of approximately 6,000 nautical miles (11,000 km; 6,900 mi) at 12 kn (22 km/h; 14 mph). The crew complement consisted of 17 officers and 542 enlisted men.

The ship was armed with eight 15 cm (5.9 in) SK L/45 guns in single pedestal mounts. Two were placed side by side forward on the forecastle, four were located amidships, two on either side, and two were arranged in a super firing pair aft. These guns fired a 45.3-pound (20.5 kg) shell at a muzzle velocity of 840 meters per second (2,800 ft/s). The guns had a maximum elevation of 30 degrees, which allowed them to engage targets out to 17,600 m (57,700 ft). They were supplied with 1,040 rounds of ammunition, for 130 shells per gun. Dresden was to have carried three 8.8 cm SK L/45 anti-aircraft guns mounted on the centerline astern of the funnels, though only two were installed, due to shortages in artillery by that late point in the war. She was also equipped with a pair of 60 cm (23.6 in) torpedo tubes with eight torpedoes in deck-mounted swivel launchers amidships. She also carried 200 mines. The ship was protected by a waterline armored belt that was 60 mm (2.4 in) thick amidships. The conning tower had 100 mm (3.9 in) thick sides, and the armor deck was covered with 60 mm thick armor plate.

== Service history ==
Dresden was ordered under the contract name "Ersatz Dresden", (Note: German warships were ordered under provisional names. Additions to the fleet were given a single letter; ships intended to replace older or lost vessels were ordered as "Ersatz (name of the ship to be replaced)".) and was laid down at the Blohm & Voss shipyard in Hamburg in August 1916. Named for the earlier cruiser Dresden that was sunk at the Battle of Más a Tierra in March 1915, the new cruiser was launched on 25 April 1917, after which fitting-out work commenced. She was commissioned into active service on 28 March 1918 to begin sea trials. She was the last major warship to enter service with the imperial fleet, and the last light cruiser to be completed. The ship's first captain was Korvettenkapitän (Corvette Captain) Prince Adalbert, the son of Kaiser Wilhelm II. After the completion of her trials in August, Dresden joined the reconnaissance screen for the High Seas Fleet. The ship was assigned to II Scouting Group, alongside the cruisers Königsberg, Pillau, Graudenz, Nürnberg, and Karlsruhe. Later that month, Dresden joined a minelaying operation to the west of the mouth of the Ems, but she was torpedoed and had to return to port with a torpedo boat as escort.

In October 1918, Dresden and the rest of II Scouting Group were to lead a final attack on the British navy. Dresden, Cöln, Pillau, and Königsberg were to attack merchant shipping in the Thames estuary while the rest of the Group were to bombard targets in Flanders, to draw out the British Grand Fleet. Scheer intended to inflict as much damage as possible on the British navy, in order to secure a better bargaining position for Germany, whatever the cost to the fleet. On the morning of 29 October 1918, the order was given to sail from Wilhelmshaven the following day. Starting on the night of 29 October, sailors on Thüringen and then on several other battleships mutinied. The unrest ultimately forced Hipper and Scheer to cancel the operation.

During the sailors' revolt, Dresden was ordered to steam to Eckernförde to serve as a relay to Kiel. Communications had been disrupted by major unrest there. The battleship Markgraf laid in Dresden's path, and her unruly crew refused to move out of Dresden's way; Markgraf aimed one of her 30.5 cm (12 in) gun turrets at Dresden, but then her crew backed down and let Dresden leave the port. The ship then went to Swinemünde, where she was decommissioned on 7 November. Her crew partially scuttled her following reports that mutinous ships were en route to attack the cruisers stationed there. After these proved false, Dresden was re-floated and returned to seaworthy condition. This involved removing the ammunition for all of the guns and allowing them to air-dry. Following the capitulation of Germany on 11 November, most of the High Seas Fleet's ships, under the command of Rear Admiral Ludwig von Reuter, were interned in the British naval base in Scapa Flow. Dresden was among the ships interned, but owing to the ship's poor condition following the naval mutiny, she was not able to steam with the rest of the fleet in November. Dresden arrived on 6 December, leaking badly.

The fleet remained in captivity during the negotiations that ultimately produced the Versailles Treaty. Reuter believed that the British intended to seize the German ships on 21 June 1919, which was the deadline for Germany to have signed the peace treaty. Unaware that the deadline had been extended to the 23rd, Reuter ordered the ships to be sunk at the next opportunity. On the morning of 21 June, the British fleet left Scapa Flow to conduct training maneuvers, and at 11:20 Reuter transmitted the order to his ships. Dresden began to sink at 13:50, and she sank before British sailors could board the ship or tow her to shallow water. She was never raised for salvage like many of the other wrecks, and instead salvage rights to the ship and her sister Cöln were sold off in the late 1950s and early 1960s. Some work was carried out to remove parts of their hulls while still submerged, but they were never raised. Salvage rights for the two cruisers expired on 17 September 1985, and their remains were sold to the Orkney Islands Council for 1 pound on 3 November 1986. Her wreck was declared a scheduled monument on 23 May 2001.

The wreck lies to this day on the port side at the bottom of Scapa Flow to the south east of the island of Cava, in a depth of 25 to 45 meters (82 to 148 ft). The upper decks have been badly damaged and the weather deck has separated from the hull, exposing her internal structure. The main guns are buried in mud. In 2017, marine archaeologists from the Orkney Research Center for Archaeology conducted extensive surveys of Dresden and nine other wrecks in the area, including six other German and three British warships. The archaeologists mapped the wrecks with sonar and examined them with remotely operated underwater vehicles as part of an effort to determine how the wrecks are deteriorating. The wreck lies between 25 and 38 m (82 and 125 ft) and remains a popular site for recreational scuba diving.
