= Königsberg-class cruiser =

Königsberg-class cruiser may refer to one of several German cruiser classes:

- Königsberg-class cruiser (1905), four ships built between 1905 and 1907
- Königsberg-class cruiser (1915), four cruisers built during World War I to replace the original Königsberg class, all four ships having been sunk or decommissioned
- Königsberg-class cruiser (1927), also known as the K class, a class of three light cruisers built between the two World Wars
