= German FK cruiser designs =

Planned light cruiser designs of the German Imperial Navy

Class overview
- Operators: Imperial German Navy
- Preceded by: Cöln-class cruiser
- Succeeded by: Emden
- Completed: 0

The German Imperial Navy (Kaiserliche Marine) created a series of fleet cruiser designs—designated Flottenkreuzer—in 1916 to follow the Cöln-class cruisers ordered in 1915. They were initially intended to favor high speed for reconnaissance over the heavier gun armament of the Cöln class, though by the final iterations, they were as powerful as the earlier class. The design staff ultimately drew up five different designs: FK 1, FK 1a, FK 2, FK 3, and FK 4. The proposals ranged in size from 3,000 metric tons (3,000 long tons; 3,300 short tons) to 7,500 t (7,400 long tons; 8,300 short tons) designed displacement and were armed with a main battery of between five and eight 15 cm (5.9 in) guns. Each proposed design grew in size over the preceding draft, as the weaponry and propulsion systems were increased. None of the designs were built, owing to shifting construction priorities in the German Navy in the last year of World War I.

== FK 1 and FK 1a ==
General characteristics
- Type: Light cruiser
- Displacement: FK 1: 3,800 t (3,700 long tons; 4,200 short tons); FK 1a: 4,850 t (4,770 long tons; 5,350 short tons)
- Beam: FK 1: 11.6 m (38 ft); FK 1a: 12.4 m (41 ft)
- Draft: FK 1: 4.9 m (16 ft); FK 1a: 4.6 m (15 ft)
- Speed: 32 to 33 knots (59 to 61 km/h; 37 to 38 mph)
- Range: 2,800 nmi (5,200 km; 3,200 mi) at 17 kn (31 km/h; 20 mph)
- Complement: 15 officers; 342 enlisted
- Armament: FK 1/FK 1a: 5 × 15 cm (5.9 in) guns; 2 × 8.8 cm (3.5 in) Flak guns; 4 × 60 cm (24 in) torpedo tubes

By 1916, thirteen German light cruisers had been lost in the course of World War I. To replace them, the Kaiserliche Marine ordered ten new cruisers of the Cöln class. The next design, under the provisional name FK 1, or Flottenkreuzer (Fleet cruiser), was prepared in 1916. The design, which emphasized the reconnaissance role and high speed over combat power, was based on the British C-class cruisers at the request of Kaiser Wilhelm II. A modified design, named FK 1a, was a slightly larger vessel.

FK 1 was 128 meters (420 ft) long at the waterline and 130 m (430 ft) long overall. The design had a beam of 11.6 m (38 ft); its forward draft was 4.9 m (16 ft) and the aft draft was 4.1 m (13 ft). The ship would have had a double bottom of approximately 52 percent of the length of the hull, and fifteen watertight compartments. The hull was constructed with longitudinal steel frames. As designed, the ship would have had a displacement of 3,000 metric tons (3,000 long tons; 3,300 short tons), with a full load combat displacement of 3,800 t (3,700 long tons; 4,200 short tons). The modified FK 1a was slightly larger, at 131 meters (430 ft) long at the waterline and 136 m (446 ft) long overall. The modified design had a beam of 12.4 m (41 ft) and a draft of 4.6 m (15 ft). The ship's hull would have been constructed as in FK 1, with the same number of watertight compartments and extent of double bottom. As designed, the ship would have had a displacement of 4,025 metric tons (3,961 long tons; 4,437 short tons), with a full load combat displacement of 4,850 t (4,770 long tons; 5,350 short tons).

Both designs would have been powered by two sets of Marine-type steam turbines that each drove a three-bladed screw 3.5 m (11 ft) wide in diameter. FK 1 would have been equipped with five Marine-type oil-fired watertube boilers, while FK 1a would have had improved double-ended models. The propulsion system of FK 1 was rated at a maximum of 48,000 shaft horsepower (36,000 kW) for a top speed of 32 knots (59 km/h; 37 mph). The improved engines of FK 1a were rated at 52,000 shp (39,000 kW) and a maximum speed of 33 kn (61 km/h; 38 mph). The designs carried up to 1,000 t (980 long tons; 1,100 short tons) and 1,150 t (1,130 long tons; 1,270 short tons) of fuel oil, respectively, which permitted a cruising radius of 2,800 nautical miles (5,200 km; 3,200 mi) at a speed of 17 kn (31 km/h; 20 mph). Both designs were equipped with three diesel generators that produced 300 kilowatts (400 hp) at 220 volts. Steering was controlled by a single rudder.

The armament of both designs consisted of five 15 cm SK L/45 guns in single mounts, one forward, two abreast of the conning tower, and two in a superfiring pair aft of the rear superstructure. The 15 cm gun fired a 45-kilogram (99 lb) shells at a muzzle velocity of 835 meters per second (2,740 ft/s). FK 1 and FK 1a were supplied with 500 and 650 shells for their main batteries, respectively. The guns had a range of 17,600 m (57,700 ft). Both designs were equipped with a pair of 8.8 cm SK L/45 anti-aircraft guns, mounted on the centerline amidships. The guns were equipped with 100 rounds of ammunition each. These guns fired a 10 kg (22 lb) shells. Both ships would have carried four 60 cm (24 in) torpedo tubes mounted on the deck in swivel launchers. FK 1a was also equipped with 100 mines. Both designs called for a crew of 15 officers and 342 enlisted men.

== FK 2, FK 3, and FK 4 ==
General characteristics
- Type: Light cruiser
- Displacement: FK 2: 5,350 t (5,270 long tons; 5,900 short tons); FK 3: 6,900 t (6,800 long tons; 7,600 short tons); FK 4: 8,650 t (8,510 long tons; 9,530 short tons)
- Beam: FK 2: 13 m (43 ft); FK 3: 14.2 m (47 ft); FK 4: 15.4 m (51 ft)
- Draft: FK 2: 5.5 m (18 ft); FK 3: 5.8 m (19 ft); FK 4: 6 m (20 ft)
- Speed: 32 to 33 kn (59 to 61 km/h; 37 to 38 mph)
- Range: 2,800 nmi (5,200 km; 3,200 mi) at 17 kn (31 km/h; 20 mph)
- Armament: FK 2: 5 × 15 cm (5.9 in) guns; 2 × 8.8 cm (3.5 in) Flak guns; 4 × 60 cm (24 in) torpedo tubes; FK 3: 7 × 15 cm guns; 3 × 8.8 cm Flak guns; 4 × 60 cm torpedo tubes; FK 4: 8 × 15 cm guns; 3 × 8.8 cm Flak guns; 4 × 60 cm torpedo tubes

Over the course of the design process that continued through 1916, the size of the projected cruisers increased as the navy added new design requirements. This resulted in the FK 2 design. The length increased to 144 m (472 ft) overall and 139 m (456 ft) at the waterline. Their beam increased to 13 m (43 ft), as did their draft, to 5.5 m (18 ft). Their displacement correspondingly rose to 4,500 t (4,400 long tons; 5,000 short tons) at normal load and 5,350 t (5,270 long tons; 5,900 short tons) at combat load, significantly greater than the original design. The FK 2 design was armed with five 15 cm SK L/45 guns and two 8.8 cm SK L/45 anti-aircraft guns. It was to carry the same 60 cm torpedo tubes in twin mounts as the earlier designs. The design retained the same propulsion system as the earlier designs, but with an improved engine type and an additional boiler, which produced an estimated 60,000 shp (45,000 kW) for a top speed of 32 knots. Range was to have been 2,800 miles at 17 knots, as in the original design.

The next iteration, FK 3, brought even more increases. Displacement rose to 6,000 t (5,900 long tons; 6,600 short tons) normal and 6,900 t (6,800 long tons; 7,600 short tons) full load, double that of the original FK design. Length was 155 m (509 ft) at the waterline and 159 m (522 ft) overall, and the beam was 14.2 m (47 ft). The armament was also augmented by an additional two 15 cm and 1 8.8 cm gun. Since the size of the ship had increased, a more powerful propulsion system was necessary; a third set of turbines was added, and the number of boilers was increased to thirteen. This produced 70,000 shp (52,000 kW), for the same speed and range figures as in the previous designs.

The final design, FK 4, was larger still. The standard displacement was 7,500 t (7,400 long tons; 8,300 short tons), and at combat load, this rose to 8,650 t (8,510 long tons; 9,530 short tons). The projected cruiser would have been 170 m (560 ft) long at the waterline, with a beam of 15.4 m (51 ft) and a draft of 6 m (20 ft). The armament was increased again, with an additional 15 cm gun. The ship's propulsion system would have included six coal-fired boilers and nine oil-fired models.

Ultimately, none of these designs were ever built, much like other late-war German warship designs, such as the L 20e α-type battleships and the Ersatz Yorck-class battlecruisers. The German shipbuilding effort largely abandoned surface warship construction and instead focused on U-boat construction in the final years of the war.

== See also ==
- La Motte-Picquet-class cruiser, a cancelled French cruiser design of the same period
