= SMS Leipzig =

Three ships of the German Kaiserliche Marine (Imperial Navy) have been named SMS Leipzig, after the Battle of Leipzig:

- SMS Leipzig (1875), a Leipzig-class corvette
- SMS Leipzig (1905), a Bremen-class cruiser that was sunk at the Battle of the Falkland Islands in 1914
- SMS Leipzig (1918), a Cöln-class cruiser that was cancelled before completion in 1918

== See also ==
- German cruiser Leipzig, a Leipzig-class cruiser during World War II
