= SMS Cöln =

SMS Cöln has been the name of two ships of the German Imperial Navy:

- SMS Cöln (1909), a light cruiser sunk at the Battle of Heligoland Bight.
- SMS Cöln (1916), a light cruiser, the lead ship of her class, the last class of light cruisers of the German Imperial Navy.

The Reichsmarine and Kriegsmarine had a ship in service, Köln. The Bundesmarine also has a ship currently in service, Köln.
