= SMS Königsberg =

There were two ships in the German Imperial Navy named SMS Königsberg:

- SMS Königsberg (1905) - a Königsberg-class light cruiser launched in 1905
- SMS Königsberg (1915) - a Königsberg-class light cruiser launched in 1916

After World War I, the Imperial Navy became the Reichsmarine.

- A third German light cruiser named Königsberg was launched in 1927.
