= SMS Cöln (1916) =

Light cruiser of the German Imperial Navy

Coordinates: 58°53′32″N 3°03′00″W

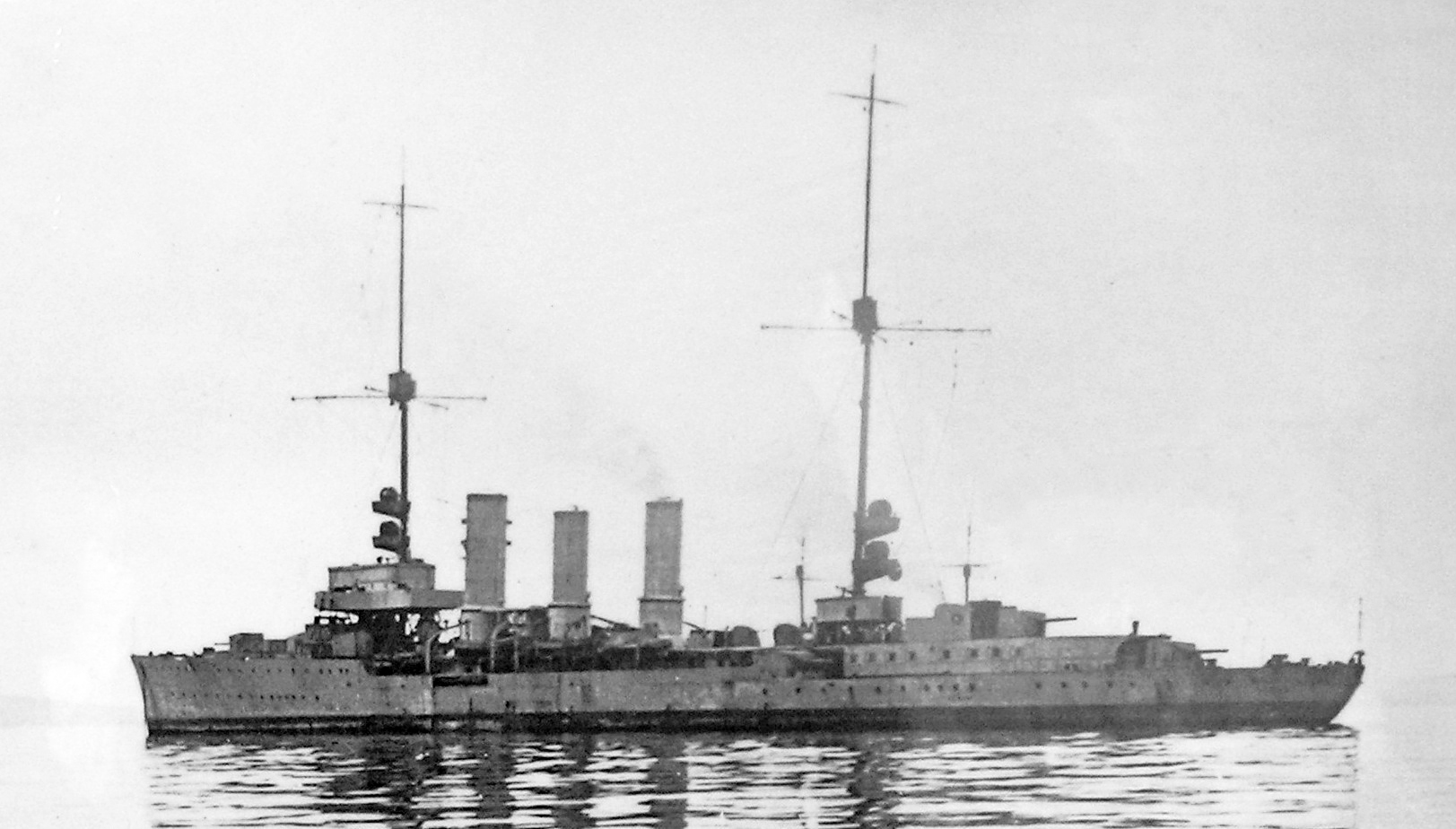
- SMS Cöln

History

German Empire
- Name: Cöln
- Namesake: City of Cöln (Cologne)
- Builder: Blohm & Voss
- Laid down: 1915
- Launched: 5 October 1916
- Commissioned: 17 January 1918
- Fate: Scuttled in Scapa Flow in June 1919

General characteristics
- Class & type: Cöln-class cruiser
- Displacement: Normal: 5,620 t (5,530 long tons); Full load: 7,486 t (7,368 long tons)
- Length: 155.5 m (510 ft)
- Beam: 14.2 m (47 ft)
- Draft: 6.01 m (19.7 ft)
- Installed power: 31,000 shp (23,000 kW); 14 × water-tube boilers
- Propulsion: 2 × screw propellers; 2 × steam turbines
- Speed: 27.5 knots (50.9 km/h; 31.6 mph)
- Range: 5,400 nmi (10,000 km; 6,200 mi) at 12 kn (22 km/h; 14 mph)
- Complement: 17 officers; 542 enlisted men
- Armament: 8 × 15 cm (5.9 in) SK L/45 guns; 3 × 8.8 cm (3.5 in) SK L/45 AA guns; 4 × 60 cm (23.6 in) torpedo tubes; 200 mines
- Armor: Belt: 60 mm (2.4 in); Deck: 60 cm

SMS Cöln was a light cruiser in the German Kaiserliche Marine (Imperial Navy), the second to bear this name, after her predecessor SMS Cöln had been lost in the Battle of Heligoland Bight. Cöln, first of her class, was launched on 5 October 1916 at Blohm & Voss in Hamburg and completed over a year later in January 1918. She and her sister Dresden were the last two light cruisers built by the Kaiserliche Marine; eight of her sisters were scrapped before they could be completed. The ships were an incremental improvement over the preceding Königsberg-class cruisers.

Cöln was commissioned into service with the High Seas Fleet ten months before the end of World War I; as a result, her service career was limited and she did not see action. She participated in a fleet operation to Norway to attack British convoys to Scandinavia, but they failed to locate any convoys and returned to port. Cöln was to have participated in a climactic sortie in the final days of the war, but a revolt in the fleet forced Admirals Reinhard Scheer and Franz von Hipper to cancel the operation. The ship was interned in Scapa Flow after the end of the war and scuttled with the fleet there on 21 June 1919, under orders from the fleet commander Rear Admiral Ludwig von Reuter. Unlike many of the other ships scuttled there, Cöln was never raised for scrapping.

== Design ==
In the first year after the start of World War I in July 1914, the German Kaiserliche Marine (Imperial Navy) suffered heavy losses among its light cruisers; by late 1915, the decision was made to begin construction on replacements. The navy was no longer constrained by the naval laws that had previously governed expenditures, and war funding was allocated for the construction of ten new vessels. Owing to the need to begin work as quickly as possible, only minor alterations were made to the preceding Königsberg class design, including the number of anti-aircraft guns and the location of the torpedo tubes.

Cöln was 155.5 meters (510 ft) long overall and had a beam of 14.2 m (47 ft) and a draft of 6.01 m (19.7 ft) forward. She displaced 5,620 t (5,530 long tons) normally and up to 7,486 t (7,368 long tons) at full load. Her propulsion system consisted of two sets of steam turbines, which drove a pair of screw propellers. Steam was provided by eight coal-fired and six oil-fired Marine-type water-tube boilers. The boilers were ducted into three funnels amidships. Her engines were rated to produce 31,000 shaft horsepower (23,000 kW) for a top speed of 27.5 kn (50.9 km/h; 31.6 mph) and a range of approximately 6,000 nautical miles (11,000 km; 6,900 mi) at 12 kn (22 km/h; 14 mph). Her crew consisted of 17 officers and 542 enlisted men.

The ship was armed with eight 15 cm (5.9 in) SK L/45 guns in single pedestal mounts. Two were placed side by side forward on the forecastle, four were located amidships, two on either side, and two were arranged in a super firing pair aft. These guns fired a 45.3-kilogram (100 lb) shell at a muzzle velocity of 840 meters per second (2,800 ft/s). The guns had a maximum elevation of 30 degrees, which allowed them to engage targets out to 17,600 m (57,700 ft). They were supplied with 1,040 rounds of ammunition, for 130 shells per gun. Cöln was to have carried three 8.8 cm SK L/45 anti-aircraft guns mounted on the centerline astern of the funnels, though only two were installed, due to shortages in artillery by that late point in the war. She was also equipped with a pair of 60 cm (23.6 in) torpedo tubes with eight torpedoes in deck-mounted swivel launchers amidships. She also carried 200 mines. The ship was protected by a waterline armored belt that was 60 mm (2.4 in) thick amidships. The conning tower had 100 mm (3.9 in) thick sides, and the armor deck was covered with 60 mm thick armor plate.

== Service history ==
=== Construction and wartime operations ===
Cöln, named after the light cruiser of the same name that was sunk at the Battle of Heligoland Bight on 28 August 1914, was ordered under the contract name "Ersatz Ariadne". (Note: German warships were ordered under provisional names. Additions to the fleet were given a single letter; ships intended to replace older or lost vessels were ordered as "Ersatz (name of the ship to be replaced)".) Her keel was laid down at the Blohm & Voss shipyard in Hamburg in 1915. She was launched on 5 October 1916, after which fitting-out work commenced. She was commissioned on 17 January 1918 under the command of Fregattenkapitän (Frigate Captain) Erich Raeder, thereafter joining the High Seas Fleet. Most of the ship's initial crew came from the light cruiser Hamburg. Cöln began sea trials in early February and completed them at the end of March. The ship then returned to the shipyard to have a new anti-mine device fitted. On 13 May, she was assigned to II Scouting Group. At that time, the unit also included her sister ship Dresden and the light cruisers Königsberg, Pillau, Graudenz, Nürnberg, and Karlsruhe.

By the last year of the war, II Scouting Group was primarily responsible for protecting the minelayers that maintained the defensive mine barrages that protected the entrances to Germany's naval bases in the North Sea. During this period, on 19 June, Cöln and the rest of the unit sortied in an unsuccessful attempt to catch the aircraft carrier HMS Furious after she had struck the German seaplane base in the Tondern raid. In late August, Cöln helped to lay a minefield off Texel. The ship incurred damage to her screws in September, and had to be dry-docked from 19 September to 11 October for repairs. At that time, Raeder was transferred to the Armistice Commission at Spa, Belgium, that negotiated the Armistice of 11 November 1918 that ended the war. In the meantime, FK Kaulhausen took command of Cöln.

In October 1918, the two ships and the rest of II Scouting Group were to lead a final attack on the British navy. Cöln, Dresden, Pillau, and Königsberg were to attack merchant shipping in the Thames estuary while the rest of the Group were to bombard targets in Flanders, to draw out the British Grand Fleet. Scheer intended to inflict as much damage as possible on the British navy, in order to secure a better bargaining position for Germany, whatever the cost to the fleet. On the morning of 29 October 1918, the order was given to sail from Wilhelmshaven the following day. Starting on the night of 29 October, sailors on Thüringen and then on several other battleships mutinied. The unrest ultimately forced Hipper and Scheer to cancel the operation. When informed of the situation, the Kaiser stated, "I no longer have a navy."

On 9 November, two days before the armistice was to go into effect, British warships were reported to be in the area, and Cöln, Graudenz, and several torpedo boats were sent to intercept them, but they made no contact. On 12 November, the day after the war ended, Cöln sailed to Wilhelmshaven, her last voyage under the Reichskriegsflagge (Imperial War Flag). There, she made preparations to be interned in Scapa Flow. At that time, Kaulhausen left the ship and Kapitänleutnant (Captain Lieutenant) Heinemann took command; he was to captain the ship during her internment.

=== Internment and scuttling ===
Following the capitulation of Germany in November 1918, most of the High Seas Fleet's ships, under the command of Rear Admiral Ludwig von Reuter, were interned in the British naval base in Scapa Flow. Cöln was among the ships interned. On the voyage there on 19 November, while steaming in the Firth of Forth, Heinemann radioed the fleet commander that one of the ship's steam turbines had a leaking condenser. Reuter dispatched another light cruiser to remain with the ship in the event that she needed to be towed. The ship was delayed by three days, but despite the problematic turbine, Cöln managed to steam into port, arriving there on 22 November.

The fleet remained in captivity during the negotiations that ultimately produced the Versailles Treaty. Reuter believed that the British intended to seize the German ships on 21 June 1919, which was the deadline for Germany to have signed the peace treaty. Unaware that the deadline had been extended to the 23rd, Reuter ordered the ships to be sunk at the next opportunity. On the morning of 21 June, the British fleet left Scapa Flow to conduct training maneuvers, and at 11:20 Reuter transmitted the order to his ships. Cöln sank at 13:50, and she sank before British sailors could board the ship or tow her to shallow water. She was never raised for salvage like many of the other wrecks, and instead salvage rights to the ship and her sister Dresden were sold off in the late 1950s and early 1960s. Some work was carried out to remove parts of their hulls while still submerged, but they were never raised. Salvage rights for the two cruisers expired on 17 September 1985, and their remains were sold to the Orkney Islands Council for 1 pound on 3 November 1986. Her wreck was declared a scheduled monument on 23 May 2001.

In 2017, marine archaeologists from the Orkney Research Center for Archaeology conducted extensive surveys of Cöln and nine other wrecks in the area, including six other German and three British warships. The archaeologists mapped the wrecks with sonar and examined them with remotely operated underwater vehicles as part of an effort to determine how the wrecks are deteriorating. Her wreck lies at 36 m (118 ft) and remains a popular site for recreational scuba divers.
