= Cöln-class cruiser =

Class of light cruisers of the German Imperial Navy

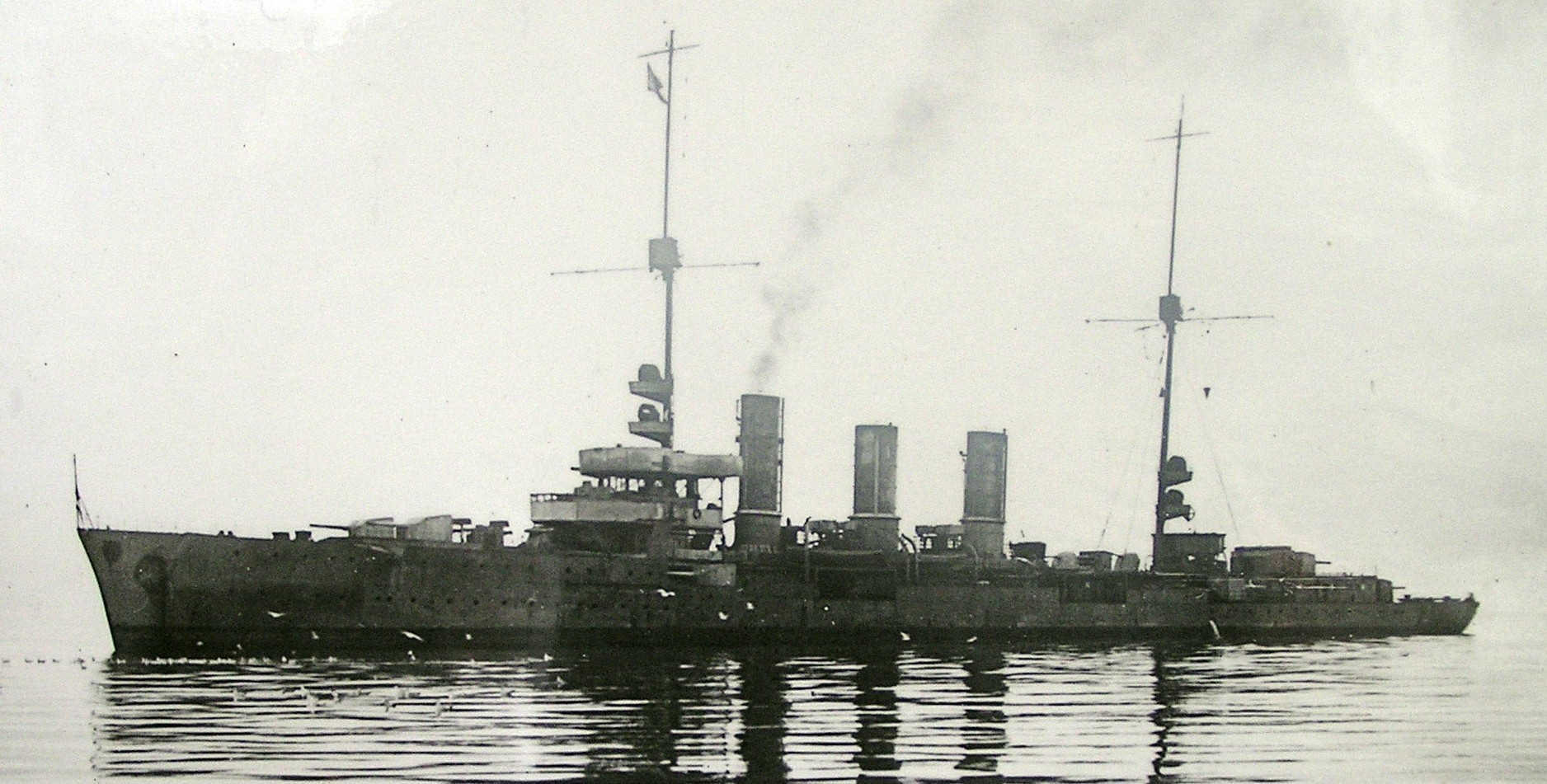
- SMS Dresden

Class overview
- Builders: Blohm & Voss and Howaldtswerke
- Operators: Imperial German Navy
- Preceded by: Brummer class
- Succeeded by: FK proposals (planned); Emden (actual)
- Planned: 10
- Completed: 2
- Cancelled: 8

General characteristics
- Type: Light cruiser
- Displacement: Normal: 5,620 t (5,530 long tons); Full load: 7,486 t (7,368 long tons)
- Length: 155.50 m (510 ft 2 in)
- Beam: 14.20 m (46 ft 7 in)
- Draft: 6.01 m (19 ft 9 in)
- Installed power: 31,000 shp (23,000 kW); 14 × water-tube boilers
- Propulsion: 2 × screw propellers; 2 × steam turbines
- Speed: 27.5 knots (50.9 km/h; 31.6 mph)
- Range: 5,400 nmi (10,000 km; 6,200 mi) at 12 knots (22 km/h; 14 mph)
- Complement: 17 officers; 542 enlisted men
- Armament: 8 × 15 cm SK L/45 guns; 3 × 8.8 cm (3.5 in) SK L/45 AA guns; 4 × 60 cm (23.6 in) torpedo tubes; 200 mines
- Armor: Belt: 60 mm (2.4 in); Deck: 20–60 mm (0.79–2.36 in); Conning tower: 100 mm (3.9 in); Gun shields: 50 mm (2.0 in)

The Cöln class of light cruisers was Germany's last class commissioned before her defeat in World War I. Originally planned to comprise ten ships, only two were completed; Cöln and Dresden. Five more were launched, but not completed: Wiesbaden, Magdeburg, Leipzig, Rostock and Frauenlob, while another three were laid down but not launched: Ersatz Cöln, Ersatz Emden and Ersatz Karlsruhe (for the last three, the names quoted were only provisional titles to be used during construction, and the three would have received other names at their launch if that had taken place). The design was a slightly modified version of the preceding Königsberg class.

Cöln and Dresden joined the High Seas Fleet in 1918, which limited their service careers. They were assigned to the II Scouting Group, and participated in an abortive fleet operation to Norway to attack British convoys. They were to have led attacks on British merchant traffic designed to lure out the British Grand Fleet and force a climactic fleet battle in the final days of the war, but the Wilhelmshaven Mutiny forced the cancellation of the plan. The two ships were interned and eventually scuttled in Scapa Flow in June 1919. Both Dresden and Cöln remain on the bottom of Scapa Flow.

== Design ==
By 1916, thirteen German light cruisers had been lost in the course of World War I. To replace them, the Kaiserliche Marine ordered ten new cruisers built to a modified Königsberg-class design. All ten ships were laid down in 1915 and 1916. Cöln was built by the Blohm & Voss shipyard in Bremen. Wiesbaden and Rostock were built at AG Vulcan in Stettin, and Leipzig, Ersatz Cöln, and Ersatz Emden were ordered from the AG Weser dockyard in Bremen. Dresden and Magdeburg were built at the Howaldtswerke shipyard in Kiel, while Frauenlob and Ersatz Karlsruhe were built by the Imperial Dockyard in Kiel.

Cöln and Dresden, the only two ships to be completed, were launched on 5 October 1916 and 25 April 1917, respectively. Wiesbaden was launched on 3 March 1917 and was five months away from completion when she was canceled in December 1918. Magdeburg followed on 17 November 1917; she was nine months from being finished when she was canceled. Leipzig was launched on 28 January 1918 and canceled seven months from completion. Rostock followed on 6 April, and also was seven months away from being finished. Frauenlob, the last ship of the class to be launched, on 16 September, was about thirteen months away from completion when she was canceled. The last three ships were canceled while still on the slipway.

=== General characteristics and machinery ===
The ships of the class were 149.80 meters (491 ft 6 in) long at the waterline and 155.50 m (510 ft 2 in) long overall. They had a beam of 14.20 m (46 ft 7 in) and a draft of 6.01 m (19 ft 9 in) forward and 6.43 m (21 ft 1 in) aft. The ships had a designed displacement of 5,620 metric tons (5,530 long tons), and at full load, they displaced 7,486 t (7,368 long tons). Their hulls were built with longitudinal steel frames. The hulls were divided into twenty-four watertight compartments and incorporated a double bottom that extended for forty-five per cent of the length of the keel. The ships had a complement of 17 officers and 542 enlisted men. They carried several smaller vessels, including one picket boat, one barge, one cutter, two yawls, and two dinghies. The German Navy regarded the ships as good sea boats, having gentle motion. The ships were highly maneuverable and had a tight turning radius, but lost speed going into a turn; in hard turns, they lost up to sixty percent of their speed. They were stern-heavy.

Their propulsion systems consisted of two sets of steam turbines, which drove a pair of screw propellers that were 3.50 m (11 ft 6 in) in diameter. Steam was provided by eight coal-fired and six oil-fired Marine-type water-tube boilers. The boilers were ducted into three funnels amidships. Electrical power was provided by two turbo generators and one diesel generator, which had a total output of 300 kilowatts at 220 volts. Steering was controlled by a single, large rudder.

The engines were rated to produce 31,000 shaft horsepower (23,000 kW) for a top speed of 27.5 knots (50.9 km/h; 31.6 mph). On trials, Cöln reached 48,708 shp (36,322 kW) and a top speed of 29.3 kn (54.3 km/h; 33.7 mph), while Dresden made 49,428 shp (36,858 kW) and 27.8 kn (51.5 km/h; 32.0 mph). Coal storage was 300 t (300 long tons; 330 short tons) as designed, though up to 1,100 t (1,100 long tons; 1,200 short tons) could be carried. Fuel oil was initially 200 t (200 long tons; 220 short tons), and could be similarly increased to 1,050 t (1,030 long tons; 1,160 short tons). At a cruising speed of 12 kn (22 km/h; 14 mph), Cöln could steam for approximately 6,000 nautical miles (11,000 km; 6,900 mi), while Dresden could steam for 5,400 nmi (10,000 km; 6,200 mi) at the same speed. At a higher speed of 25 kn (46 km/h; 29 mph), the range fell considerably, to 1,200 nmi (2,200 km; 1,400 mi).

=== Armament and armor ===
The ship was armed with eight 15 cm (5.9 in) SK L/45 guns in single pedestal mounts. Two were placed side by side forward on the forecastle, four were located amidships, two on either side, and two were arranged in a super firing pair aft. Aboard Cöln, the forward pair of amidships guns were placed on the forecastle deck, while on the rest of the ships in the class, they were placed one deck lower, on the upper deck. These guns fired a 45.3-kilogram (100 lb) shell at a muzzle velocity of 840 meters per second (2,800 ft/s). The guns had a maximum elevation of 30 degrees, which allowed them to engage targets out to 17,600 m (57,700 ft). They were supplied with 1,040 rounds of ammunition, for 130 shells per gun. The ships also carried three 8.8 cm (3.5 in) SK L/45 anti-aircraft guns mounted on the centerline astern of the funnels, though one was removed in 1918. These guns fired a 10 kg (22 lb) shells at a muzzle velocity of 750 to 770 m/s (2,500 to 2,500 ft/s). She was also equipped with four 60 cm (23.6 in) torpedo tubes with eight torpedoes in deck-mounted swivel launchers amidships. The ships were also outfitted to carry up to 200 mines.

The Cöln class ships were protected by an armor belt composed of Krupp cemented steel. It was 60 mm (2.4 in) thick amidships and 18 mm (0.71 in) forward. The stern was not protected by armor. The armored deck was 20 mm (0.79 in) thick in the stern, 40 mm (1.6 in) thick amidships, and 60 mm thick forward. Sloped armor 40 mm thick connected the deck and belt armor. The conning tower had 100 mm (3.9 in) thick sides and a 20 mm thick roof. The main battery guns were protected with 50 mm (2.0 in) thick gun shields.

== Ships of the class ==
Construction data
Name	Builder	Laid down	Launched	Completed	Fate
Cöln	Blohm & Voss	1915	5 October 1916	17 January 1918	Scuttled in Scapa Flow on 21 June 1919
Dresden	Howaldtswerke	1916	25 April 1917	28 March 1918	Scuttled in Scapa Flow on 21 June 1919
Wiesbaden	AG Vulcan	1915	3 March 1917	N/A	Not completed, scrapped in 1920
Magdeburg	Howaldtswerke	1916	17 November 1917	N/A	Not completed, scrapped in 1922
Leipzig	AG Weser	1915	28 January 1918	N/A	Not completed, scrapped in 1921
Rostock	AG Vulcan	1915	6 April 1918	N/A	Not completed, scrapped in 1921
Frauenlob	Kaiserliche Werft Kiel	1915	16 October 1918	N/A	Not completed, scrapped in 1921
Ersatz Cöln	AG Weser	1916	N/A	N/A	Not completed, scrapped in 1921
Ersatz Emden	AG Weser	1916	N/A	N/A	Not completed, scrapped in 1921
Ersatz Karlsruhe	Kaiserliche Werft Kiel	1916	N/A	N/A	Not completed, scrapped in 1920

== Service history ==
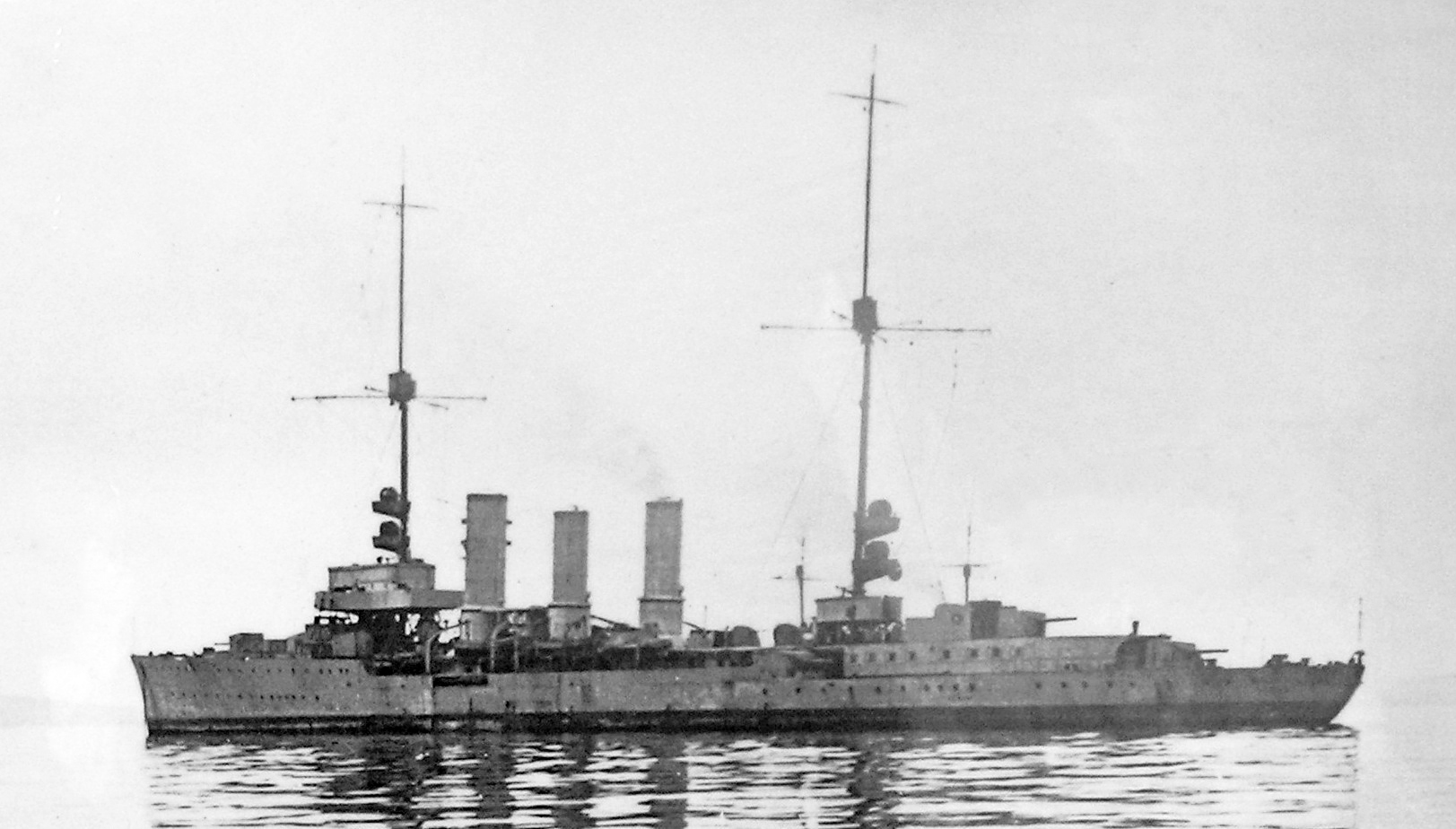
Cöln in Scapa Flow

After their commissioning, Cöln and Dresden joined the High Seas Fleet. They were assigned to the II Scouting Group, alongside the cruisers Königsberg, Pillau, Graudenz, Nürnberg, and Karlsruhe. The ships were in service in time for the major fleet operation to Norway in 23–24 April 1918. The I Scouting Group and II Scouting Group, along with the Second Torpedo-Boat Flotilla were to attack a heavily guarded British convoy to Norway, with the rest of the High Seas Fleet steaming in support. The Germans failed to locate the convoy, which had in fact sailed the day before the fleet left port. As a result, Admiral Reinhard Scheer broke off the operation and returned to port.

In October 1918, the two ships and the rest of the II Scouting Group were to lead a final attack on the British navy. Cöln, Dresden, Pillau, and Königsberg were to attack merchant shipping in the Thames estuary while the rest of the Group were to bombard targets in Flanders, to draw out the British Grand Fleet. Scheer intended to inflict as much damage as possible on the British navy, in order to secure a better bargaining position for Germany, whatever the cost to the fleet. On the morning of 29 October 1918, the order was given to sail from Wilhelmshaven the following day. Starting on the night of 29 October, sailors on Thüringen and then on several other battleships mutinied.

During the sailors' revolt, the crew of the battleship Markgraf refused to move out of Dresden's way; she aimed one of her 30.5 cm (12.0 in) gun turrets at Dresden, but then backed down and let Dresden leave the port. The ship then went to Swinemünde, where she was partially scuttled and subsequently re-floated and returned to seaworthy condition. The unrest ultimately forced Hipper and Scheer to cancel the operation. When informed of the situation, the Kaiser stated, "I no longer have a navy." Following the capitulation of Germany in November 1918, most of the High Seas Fleet's ships, under the command of Rear Admiral Ludwig von Reuter, were interned in the British naval base in Scapa Flow. Cöln and Dresden were among the ships interned.

=== Postwar fates ===
The fleet remained in captivity during the negotiations that ultimately produced the Versailles Treaty. Reuter believed that the British intended to seize the German ships on 21 June 1919, which was the deadline for Germany to have signed the peace treaty. Unaware that the deadline had been extended to the 23rd, Reuter ordered the ships to be sunk at the next opportunity. On the morning of 21 June, the British fleet left Scapa Flow to conduct training maneuvers, and at 11:20 Reuter transmitted the order to his ships. Cöln sank at 13:50 and was never raised for scrapping. Dresden also remains at the bottom of Scapa Flow.

The eight ships that were not completed by the end of the war were formally stricken from the naval register on 17 November 1919. The navy considered selling the vessels for conversion into cargo ships, even those like Ersatz Karlsruhe that had had little work done; according to the proposals, they would have received diesel engines from unfinished U-boats. By 1920, the Deutsches Petroleumgesellschaft had acquired the rights to the ships, planning to convert them into oil tankers, and this plan was approved by the Naval Inter-Allied Commission of Control, which specified that any military features in the ships (to include side and deck armor and torpedo bulkheads) were to be removed and destroyed by 31 July 1921. By this time, Wiesbaden and Rostock had been towed to Lübeck, where conversion work had started. Their old machinery had been removed by November 1920 and their military features had been cut away by the NIACC deadline. Magdeburg had been similarly demilitarized at Howaldtswerke.

While the conversion program was underway, in May 1920, the postwar German navy requested permission to use the incomplete hull of Magdeburg for the new cruiser Emden. Germany was permitted to build to replace one of the old cruiser Niobe, and they cited economic grounds (since simply reusing the unfinished hull would be much cheaper than building one from the keel up) as justification to use Magdeburg. Britain initially approved the request, but France and Italy were unwilling to allow any alteration to the Versailles terms to avoid setting the precedent for further revisions. The German request was rejected on 22 August 1922, by which time Magdeburg had already been sold for scrap.

The oil tanker conversion program eventually fell apart, however, and all of the vessels were broken up. Magdeburg was sold on 28 October 1921 and broken up the next year at Kiel-Nordmole. Leipzig and Rostock were sold in 1921 and scrapped in Hamburg. Frauenlob was towed to the Deutsche Werke shipyard in 1921 and broken up. Ersatz Karlsruhe was dismantled on the slipway in 1920, and Ersatz Cöln and Ersatz Emden were sold on 21 and 25 June 1921, respectively. Both vessels had been launched at some point to clear the slipway, and by August 1920, Ersatz Emden had been towed to Bremen. Both ships were scrapped in 1921 in Hamburg.
