= SS Köln =

SS Köln may refer to one of the following passenger steamers for North German Lloyd:

- SS Köln (1870), in service 1870–1895; scrapped 1895
- SS Köln (1899), lead ship her class; in service, 1899–1917; seized by the United States in 1917; served as troop transport USS Amphion (ID-1888) during World War I; scrapped 1924
- SS Köln (1922), in service 1922–1940
