= Königsberg-class cruiser (1915) =

Class of light cruisers of the German Imperial Navy

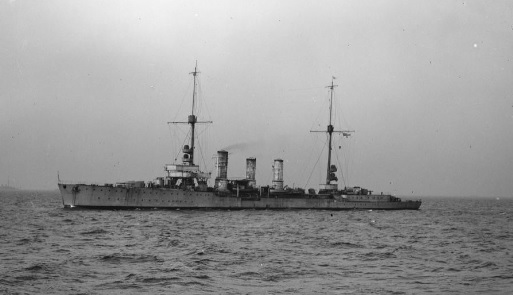
- One of the Königsberg-class cruisers en route to Scapa Flow

Class overview
- Name: Königsberg class
- Builders: AG Weser (2); Kaiserliche Werft Wilhelmshaven (1); Howaldtswerke (1)
- Operators: Imperial German Navy; French Navy
- Preceded by: Wiesbaden class
- Succeeded by: Brummer class
- Built: 1914–1917
- In commission: 1916–1933
- Completed: 4
- Lost: 1
- Retired: 3

General characteristics
- Type: Light cruiser
- Displacement: Normal: 5,440 t (5,350 long tons); Full load: 7,125 t (7,012 long tons)
- Length: 151.40 m (496 ft 9 in)
- Beam: 14.20 m (46 ft 7 in)
- Draft: 5.96 m (19 ft 7 in)
- Installed power: 31,000 shp (23,000 kW); 12 × water-tube boilers
- Propulsion: 2 × screw propellers; 2 × steam turbines
- Speed: 27.5 knots (50.9 km/h)
- Range: 4,850 nmi (8,980 km; 5,580 mi) at 12 knots (22 km/h; 14 mph)
- Crew: 17 officers; 458 enlisted men
- Armament: 8 × 15 cm (5.9 in) SK L/45 guns; 2 × 8.8 cm (3.5 in) SK L/45 guns; 4 × 50 cm (19.7 in) torpedo tubes; mines
- Armor: Belt: 60 mm (2.4 in); Deck: 60 mm

The Königsberg class of light cruisers was a group of four ships commissioned into Germany's Kaiserliche Marine (Imperial Navy) shortly before the end of World War I. The class comprised Königsberg, Karlsruhe, Emden, and Nürnberg, all of which were named after light cruisers lost earlier in the war. The ships were an incremental improvement over the preceding Wiesbaden-class cruisers, and were armed with a main battery of eight 15 cm (5.9 in) SK L/45 guns and had a designed speed of 27.5 knots (50.9 km/h; 31.6 mph).

Königsberg and Nürnberg saw action at the Second Battle of Heligoland Bight, where Königsberg was hit by a shell from the battlecruiser Repulse. Three of the four ships were to participate in a climactic fleet operation to attack the British Grand Fleet in the final days of the war, but revolts in the fleet forced the cancellation of the plan. Karlsruhe, Emden, and Nürnberg were interned at Scapa Flow after the end of the war, and were scuttled on 21 June 1919, though only Karlsruhe was successfully sunk. The other two ships were beached by British sailors and ceded to the Allies. Königsberg was transferred to the French Navy as a war prize and commissioned as Metz; she served with the French Navy until the 1930s, when she was broken up for scrap.

== Design ==
The design for the Königsbergs was prepared in 1913. The design was an incremental improvement over the previous Wiesbaden class, with a larger hull and greater displacement, but with the same armament, speed, and armor protection. By 1916, thirteen German light cruisers had been lost in the course of World War I; after they were commissioned, the ships of the Königsberg class took the names of four of these lost cruisers.

Königsberg was ordered as Ersatz Gazelle and laid down at the AG Weser shipyard in Bremen in 1914. She was launched on 18 December 1915 and commissioned eight months later on 12 August 1916. Emden, ordered as Ersatz Nymphe, followed her sister at AG Weser, also in 1914. She was launched on 1 February 1916 and commissioned into the fleet on 16 December 1916. Karlsruhe was ordered as Ersatz Niobe and laid down in 1915 at the Kaiserliche Werft (Imperial Dockyard) in Kiel. Launching ceremonies took place on 31 January 1916, and after fitting-out work was completed, she was commissioned on 15 November 1916. The last ship of the class, Nürnberg, was laid down as Ersatz Thetis at the Howaldtswerke shipyard in Kiel in 1915. She was launched on 14 April 1916 and commissioned on 15 February 1917.

In addition to providing the basis for the follow-on Cöln-class cruisers, the Königsberg design was also the starting point for the light cruiser Emden built by the Reichsmarine in the 1920s, since blueprints for Karlsruhe were still available. This was a result of personnel shortages in the design staff and the closure of the Navy's Ship Testing Institute, which prevented the development of a new design.

=== General characteristics and machinery ===
The ships of the class were 145.80 meters (478 ft 4 in) long at the waterline and 151.40 m (496 ft 9 in) long overall. They had a beam of 14.20 m (46 ft 7 in) and a draft of 5.96 m (19 ft 7 in) forward and 6.32 m (20 ft 9 in) aft. The ships had a designed displacement of 5,440 metric tons (5,350 long tons), and at full combat load, they displaced 7,125 t (7,012 long tons). Their hulls were built with longitudinal steel frames. The hulls were divided into eighteen watertight compartments and incorporated a double bottom that extended for forty-five percent of the length of the keel. The ships had a complement of 17 officers and 458 enlisted men. They carried several smaller vessels, including one picket boat, one barge, one cutter, two yawls, and two dinghies. The German Navy regarded the ships as good sea boats, having gentle motion. The ships were highly maneuverable and had a tight turning radius, but lost speed going into a turn. In hard turns, they lost up to sixty percent speed. The ships were also stern-heavy.

The propulsion systems for Königsberg, Emden, and Nürnberg consisted of two steam turbines, while Karlsruhe was outfitted with two sets of high-pressure geared turbines. The turbines for all four ships were powered by ten coal-fired boilers and two oil-fired double-ended boilers. The turbines drove a pair of three-bladed screws, which were 3.50 m (11 ft 6 in) in diameter. The engines were rated at 31,000 shaft horsepower (23,000 kW) for a top speed of 27.5 knots (50.9 km/h; 31.6 mph). On trials, Königsberg reached 45,900 shp (34,200 kW) and a top speed of 27.8 knots (51.5 km/h; 32.0 mph), while Karlsruhe made 55,700 shp (41,500 kW) and 27.7 knots (51.3 km/h; 31.9 mph). Emden reached 50,216 shp (37,446 kW) and 27.7 kn; Nürnberg's trials figures are not recorded. The trials were conducted in shallow water due to the war; in deep water, the ships would have exceeded 29 knots (54 km/h; 33 mph).

Coal storage was 350 t (340 long tons; 390 short tons) as designed, though up to 1,340 t (1,320 long tons; 1,480 short tons) could be carried. Fuel oil was initially 150 t (150 long tons; 170 short tons), and could be similarly increased to 500 t (490 long tons; 550 short tons). At a cruising speed of 12 knots (22 km/h; 14 mph), the ships could steam for approximately 4,850 nautical miles (8,980 km; 5,580 mi). At a higher speed of 27 knots (50 km/h; 31 mph), the range fell considerably, to 1,200 nmi (2,200 km; 1,400 mi). Electrical power was provided by two turbo generators and one diesel generator, with a total output of 300 kilowatts at 220 volts. Steering was controlled by a single, large rudder.

=== Armament and armor ===
The ship was armed with a main battery of eight 15 cm (5.9 in) SK L/45 guns in single pedestal mounts. Two were placed side by side forward on the forecastle, four were located amidships, two on either side, and two were arranged in a superfiring pair aft. These guns fired a 45.3-kilogram (100 lb) shell at a muzzle velocity of 840 meters per second (2,800 ft/s). The guns had a maximum elevation of 30 degrees, which allowed them to engage targets out to 17,600 m (19,200 yd). They were supplied with 1,040 rounds of ammunition, for 130 shells per gun. The ships also carried two 8.8 cm (3.5 in) L/45 anti-aircraft guns mounted on the centerline astern of the funnels. These guns fired a 10 kg (22 lb) shells at a muzzle velocity of 750 to 770 m/s (2,500 to 2,500 ft/s). She was also equipped with four 50 cm (19.7 in) torpedo tubes with eight torpedoes, two in deck-mounted swivel launchers and two submerged in the ships' hulls. The ships were also outfitted to carry up to 200 mines.

The Königsberg-class ships were protected by an armored belt composed of Krupp cemented steel. It was 60 mm (2.4 in) thick amidships and 18 mm (0.71 in) forward. The stern was not protected by armor. The armored deck was 20 mm (0.79 in) thick in the stern, 40 mm (1.6 in) thick amidships, and 60 mm thick forward. Sloped armor 40 mm thick connected the deck and belt armor. The conning tower had 100 mm (3.9 in) thick sides and a 20 mm thick roof. The main battery guns were protected with 50 mm (2 in) thick gun shields. A 20 mm thick deck and 30 mm thick side armor protected the mine hold.

== Service history ==
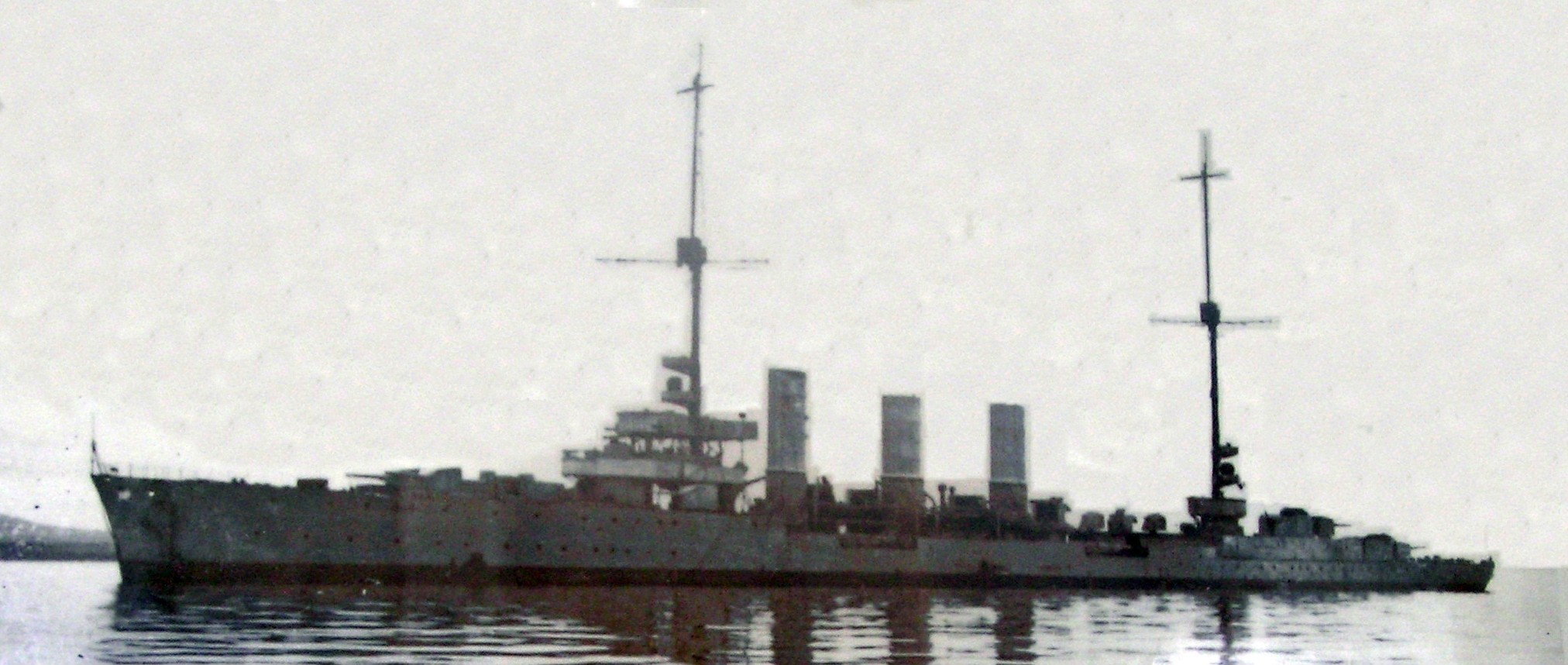
SMS Karlsruhe in Scapa Flow

On 17 November 1917, Königsberg and Nürnberg saw action at the Second Battle of Heligoland Bight. Along with two other cruisers from II Scouting Group and the dreadnought battleships Kaiser and Kaiserin, Königsberg and Nürnberg escorted minesweepers clearing paths in minefields laid by the British. During the engagement, the battlecruiser HMS Repulse scored a hit on Königsberg, which did minimal damage but started a serious fire. The British broke off the attack when the German battleships arrived on the scene, after which the Germans also withdrew. All four ships participated in Operation Albion, an amphibious operation against the islands in the Gulf of Riga. Emden served as the flagship for the Leader of Torpedoboats, while the other three ships were assigned to II Scouting Group.

In October 1918, three of the ships and the rest of II Scouting Group were to lead a final attack on the British navy. Königsberg Cöln, Dresden, and Pillau were to attack merchant shipping in the Thames estuary while Karlsruhe, Nürnberg, and Graudenz were to bombard targets in Flanders, to draw out the British Grand Fleet. Großadmiral Reinhard Scheer, the commander in chief of the fleet, intended to inflict as much damage as possible on the British navy, in order to secure a better bargaining position for Germany, whatever the cost to the fleet. On the morning of 29 October 1918, the order was given to sail from Wilhelmshaven the following day. Starting on the night of 29 October, sailors on Thüringen and then on several other battleships mutinied. The unrest ultimately forced Hipper and Scheer to cancel the operation. When informed of the situation, the Kaiser stated, "I no longer have a navy."

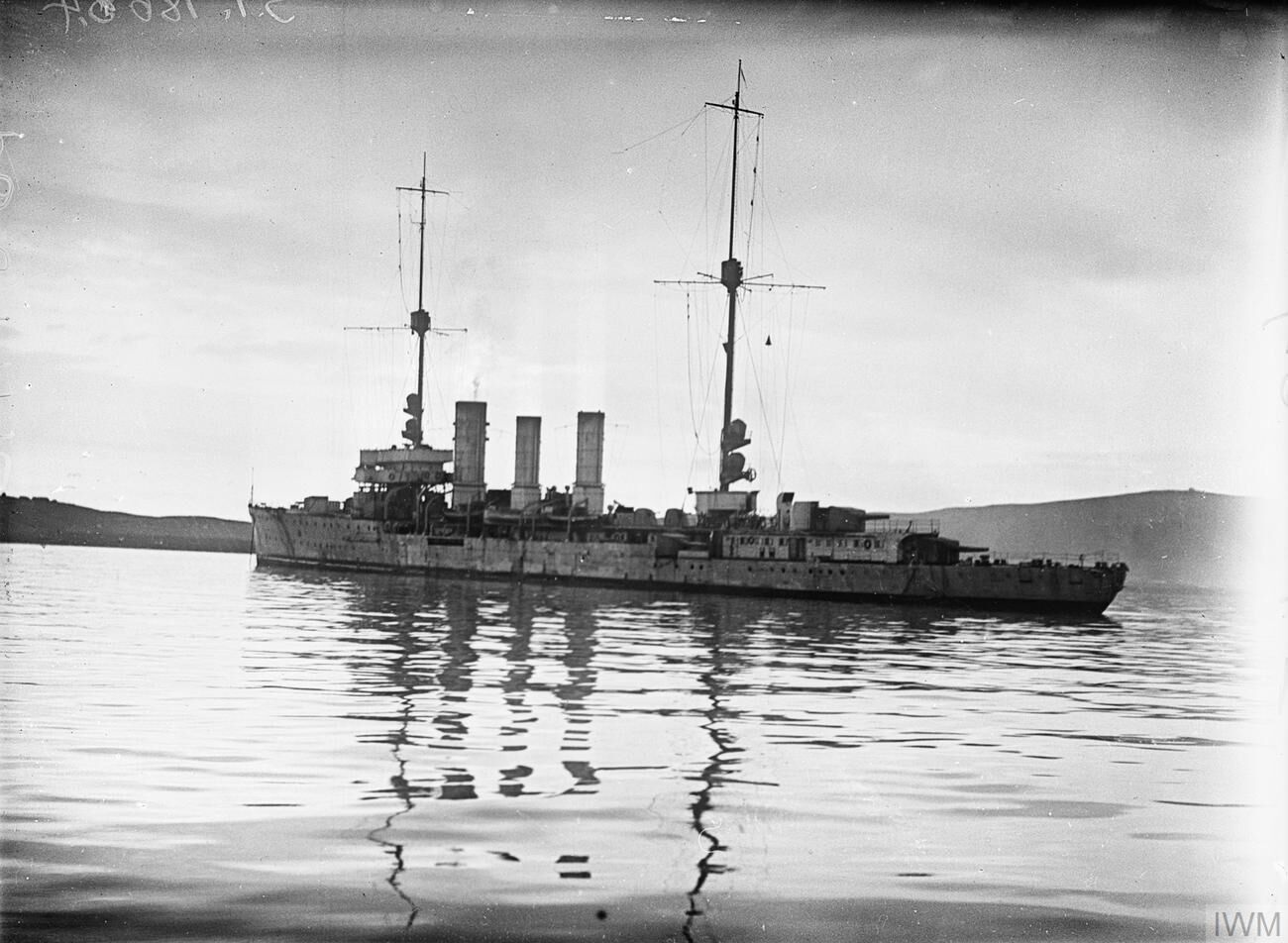
Emden in Scapa Flow

Following the Armistice that ended the fighting, Königsberg took Rear Admiral Hugo Meurer to Scapa Flow to negotiate with Admiral David Beatty, the commander of the Grand Fleet, for the place of internment of the German fleet. The accepted arrangement was for the High Seas Fleet to meet the combined Allied fleet in the North Sea and proceed to the Firth of Forth before transferring to Scapa Flow, where they would be interned. Most of the High Seas Fleet's ships, including Karlsruhe, Emden, and Nürnberg, were interned in the British naval base in Scapa Flow, under the command of Rear Admiral Ludwig von Reuter. Königsberg instead remained in Germany.

The unruly crew of Friedrich der Grosse, the fleet flagship, forced Reuter to transfer to Emden, where a Sailors' Council cooperated with the ship's captain to run the ship. The fleet remained in captivity during the negotiations that ultimately produced the Versailles Treaty. Reuter believed that the British intended to seize the German ships on 21 June 1919, which was the deadline for Germany to have signed the peace treaty. Unaware that the deadline had been extended to the 23rd, Reuter ordered the ships to be sunk at the next opportunity. On the morning of 21 June, the British fleet left Scapa Flow to conduct training maneuvers, and at 11:20 Reuter transmitted the order to his ships.

Karlsruhe sank at 15:50; the rights to salvaging the ship were sold in 1962. She has not been raised for scrapping, however. Emden was boarded by British sailors who beached her before she could be completely sunk. After being refloated, she was ceded to France and used as a test ship for explosives before being broken up in 1926. Nürnberg was also beached by British sailors. She was eventually sunk off the Isle of Wight as a gunnery target. Königsberg was meanwhile stricken from the naval register on 20 July 1920 and ceded to France. She was renamed Metz and served with the French Navy until 1933. She was ultimately broken up for scrap in 1936.
