= SMS Nürnberg (1916) =

Light cruiser of the German Imperial Navy

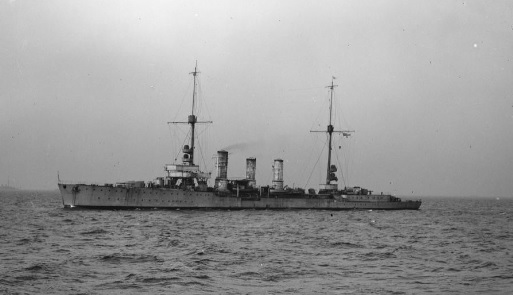
- One of the Königsberg-class cruisers en route to Scapa Flow

History

German Empire
- Name: Nürnberg
- Namesake: Nürnberg
- Builder: Howaldtswerke, Kiel
- Laid down: 8 May 1915
- Launched: 14 April 1916
- Commissioned: February 1917
- Fate: Sunk as target 7 July 1922

General characteristics
- Class & type: Königsberg-class cruiser (1915)
- Displacement: Normal: 5,440 t (5,350 long tons); Full load: 7,125 t (7,012 long tons)
- Length: 151.4 m (496 ft 9 in)
- Beam: 14.2 m (46 ft 7 in)
- Draft: 5.96 m (19 ft 7 in)
- Installed power: 31,000 shp (23,000 kW); 12 × water-tube boilers
- Propulsion: 2 × screw propellers; 2 × steam turbines
- Speed: 27.5 knots (50.9 km/h)
- Range: 4,850 nmi (8,980 km; 5,580 mi) at 12 kn (22 km/h; 14 mph)
- Crew: 17 officers; 458 enlisted men
- Armament: 8 × 15 cm (5.9 in) SK L/45 guns; 2 × 8.8 cm (3.5 in) SK L/45 guns; 4 × 50 cm (19.7 in) torpedo tubes; 200 mines
- Armor: Belt: 60 mm (2.4 in); Deck: 60 cm; Conning tower: 100 mm (3.9 in)

SMS Nürnberg was a Königsberg-class light cruiser built during World War I by Germany for the Imperial Navy. She had three sisters: Königsberg, Karlsruhe, and Emden. The ship was named after the previous light cruiser Nürnberg, which had been sunk at the Battle of the Falkland Islands. The new cruiser was laid down in 1915 at the AG Weser shipyard in Bremen, launched in April 1916, and commissioned into the High Seas Fleet in February 1917. Armed with eight 15 cm (5.9 in) SK L/45 guns, the ship had a top speed of 27.5 kn (50.9 km/h; 31.6 mph).

Nürnberg saw relatively limited service during the war, due to her commissioning late in the conflict. She participated in Operation Albion in October 1917 against the Russian Navy in the Baltic. The following month, she was engaged in the Second Battle of Helgoland Bight, but was not significantly damaged during the engagement. She was assigned to the final, planned operation of the High Seas Fleet that was to have taken place in the closing days of the war, though a major mutiny forced the cancellation of the plan. After the end of the war, the ship was interned in Scapa Flow. In the scuttling of the German fleet in June 1919, British ships managed to beach Nürnberg and she was later refloated and sunk as a gunnery target in 1922.

== Design ==
Design work began on the Königsberg-class cruisers before construction had begun on their predecessors of the Wiesbaden class. The new ships were broadly similar to the earlier cruisers, with only minor alterations in the arrangement of some components, including the forward broadside guns, which were raised a level to reduce their tendency to be washed out in heavy seas. They were also fitted with larger conning towers.

Nürnberg was 151.4 meters (496 ft 9 in) long overall and had a beam of 14.2 m (46 ft 7 in) and a draft of 5.96 m (19 ft 7 in) forward. She displaced 5,440 t (5,350 long tons) normally and up to 7,125 t (7,012 long tons) at full load. The ship had a fairly small superstructure that consisted primarily of a conning tower forward. She was fitted with a pair of pole masts, the fore just aft of the conning tower and the mainmast further aft. Her hull had a long forecastle that extended for the first third of the ship, stepping down to main deck level just aft of the conning tower, before reducing a deck further at the mainmast for a short quarterdeck. The ship had a crew of 17 officers and 458 enlisted men.

Her propulsion system consisted of two sets of steam turbines that drove a pair of screw propellers. Steam was provided by ten coal-fired and two oil-fired Marine-type water-tube boilers that were vented through three funnels. The engines were rated to produce 31,000 shaft horsepower (23,000 kW), which provided a top speed of 27.5 kn (50.9 km/h; 31.6 mph). At a more economical cruising speed of 12 knots (22 km/h; 14 mph), the ship had a range of 4,850 nautical miles (8,980 km; 5,580 mi).

The ship was armed with a main battery of eight 15 cm (5.9 in) SK L/45 guns in single pedestal mounts. Two were placed side by side forward on the forecastle, two were located on either side amidships, and two were arranged in a superfiring pair aft. They were supplied with 1,040 rounds of ammunition, for 130 shells per gun. Nürnberg also carried two 8.8 cm (3.5 in) SK L/45 anti-aircraft guns mounted on the centerline astern of the funnels. She was also equipped with a pair of 50 cm (19.7 in) torpedo tubes with eight torpedoes in deck-mounted swivel launchers amidships. She also carried 200 mines.

The ship was protected by a waterline armor belt that was 60 mm (2.4 in) thick amidships. Protection for the ship's internals was reinforced with a curved armor deck that was 60 mm thick; the deck sloped downward at the sides and connected to the bottom edge of the belt armor. The conning tower had 100 mm (3.9 in) thick sides.

== Service history ==
Nürnberg was ordered under the contract name "Ersatz Thetis", (Note: German warships were ordered under provisional names. Additions to the fleet were given a single letter; ships intended to replace older or lost vessels were ordered as "Ersatz (name of the ship to be replaced)".) and was laid down at the AG Weser shipyard in Bremen on 8 May 1915. She was launched on 14 April 1916, after which fitting-out work commenced. She was commissioned on 15 February 1917, under the command of Fregattenkapitän (FK—Frigate Captain) Walter Hildebrand. She thereafter began sea trials, which concluded on 1 May, at which time she was assigned to II Scouting Group, part of the reconnaissance screen of the High Seas Fleet. From July to August, the ships of II Scouting Group were used in coastal defense patrols in the German Bight.

=== Operation Albion ===
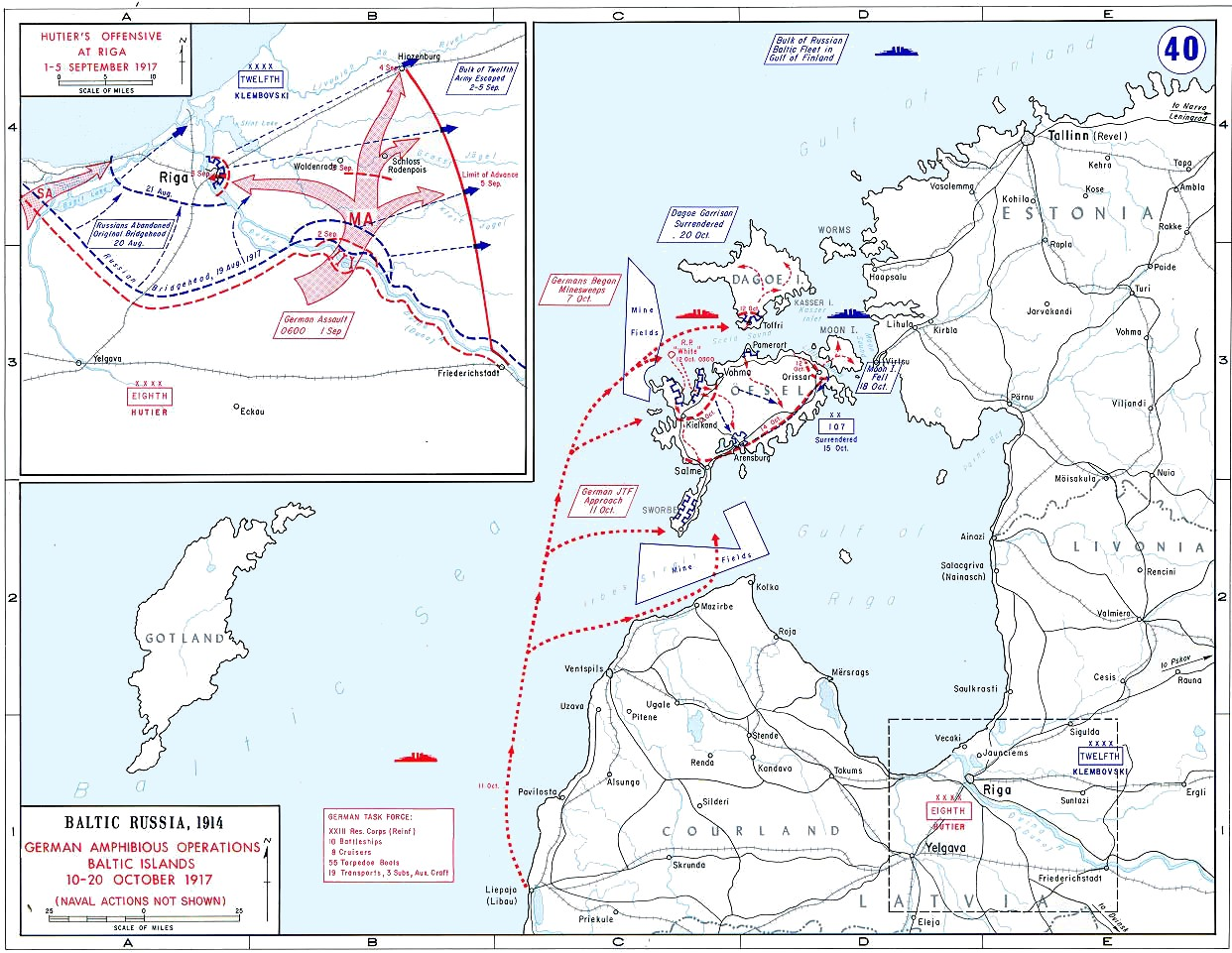
Operations of the German Navy and Army during Operation Albion

In early September 1917, following the German conquest of the Russian port of Riga, the German navy decided to eliminate the Russian naval forces that still held the Gulf of Riga. The Admiralstab (the Navy High Command) planned an operation to seize the Baltic island of Ösel, and specifically the Russian gun batteries on the Sworbe Peninsula. On 18 September, the order was issued for a joint operation with the army to capture Ösel and Moon Islands; the primary naval component was to comprise the flagship, Moltke, along with III and IV Battle Squadrons of the High Seas Fleet. The invasion force amounted to approximately 24,600 officers and enlisted men. Nürnberg and the rest of II Scouting Group, commanded by Rear Admiral Ludwig von Reuter, provided the cruiser screen for the task force. II Scouting Group left Kiel on 23 September and arrived in Libau two days later, where final preparations for the attack took place.

On 11 October, Nürnberg took on a contingent of soldiers and got underway as part of the escort for several transport ships, carrying most of the landing force, and a collier and several tugboats. The force arrived in Tagga Bay the next morning and began the attack, when Moltke and the III Squadron ships engaged Russian positions in Tagga Bay while IV Squadron shelled Russian gun batteries on the Sworbe Peninsula on Ösel After the beginning of the bombardment, Nürnberg entered Tagga Bay with II Transport Section and began landing troops, while Königsberg covered the landing of I Transport Section. On 18–19 October, the rest of II Scouting Group covered minesweepers operating off the island of Dagö, but due to insufficient minesweepers and bad weather, the operation was postponed. On the 19th, Nürnberg, Königsberg, and Danzig were sent to intercept two Russian torpedo boats reported to be in the area. Reuter could not locate the vessels, and broke off the operation.

By 20 October, the islands were under German control and the Russian naval forces had either been destroyed or forced to withdraw. The Admiralstab ordered the naval component to return to the North Sea. Nürnberg remained at in the gulf until 24 October, when she got underway for the North Sea, stopping in Libau on the way back. After arriving in the North Sea, Nürnberg and the rest of II Scouting Group resumed coastal defense duties.

=== Second Battle of Helgoland Bight ===
On 17 November, Nürnberg, Königsberg, Frankfurt, and Pillau were assigned to cover a minesweeping operation in the Helgoland Bight, still under the command of Reuter. The force was supported by two battleships—Kaiser and Kaiserin. Six British battlecruisers supported a force of light cruisers that attacked the German minesweepers. Königsberg and the other three cruisers covered the fleeing minesweepers before retreating under a smoke screen. Nürnberg opened fire on the British cruisers at 08:55, at a range of 11 km (6.8 mi). Heavy smoke and fog obscured the British ships, however, and Nürnberg was quickly forced to cease firing.

At around 10:00, Nürnberg came under heavy fire from the British cruisers, as well as the powerful battlecruisers Courageous and Glorious, armed with 15-inch (380 mm) guns. Nürnberg was not hit directly, but shell splinters from near misses rained down on her deck, causing light casualties. According to the historian Gary Staff, the hit killed one man and wounded four more, one of whom later died of his wounds, while the historians Hans Hildebrand, Albert Röhr, and Hans-Otto Steinmetz report one fatality and nine wounded men. One of her rangefinders was also damaged by the shell fragments. She returned fire briefly before the haze again concealed the British ships. Kaiser and Kaiserin intervened at almost exactly the same time, prompting the British to break off the engagement immediately. Within an hour, the German forces were reinforced by several capital ships, including the battlecruiser Hindenburg; after realizing the British had fled, the German forces returned to port.

=== End of the war ===
FK Hans Quaet-Faslem relieved Hildebrand as the ship's commander in January 1918. On 23 March, Nürnberg was dry-docked in Kiel for an overhaul that lasted until 6 May, so she was unavailable for the fleet operation on 23–24 April, the last time the German fleet went to sea for a major operation. After returning to service, Nürnberg covered a minelaying operation from 10 to 13 May in company with the rest of her group. She was also among the vessels that sortied in an attempt to catch the British aircraft carrier HMS Furious after the Tondern raid on 19 July. That month, FK Wolfgang Wegener replaced Quaet-Faslem.

In October, Admirals Reinhard Scheer and Franz von Hipper planned a final, climactic attack on the British by the High Seas Fleet. The planned operation called for raids on Allied shipping in the Thames estuary and Flanders to draw out the Grand Fleet. The German fleet would then attack the Grand Fleet and do as much damage as possible in order to enhance Germany's military position in the coming peace talks. Nürnberg, Karlsruhe and Graudenz were assigned to the force tasked with attacking Flanders. On the morning of 29 October 1918, the order was given to sail from Wilhelmshaven the following day. Starting on the night of 29 October, sailors on Thüringen and then on several other battleships mutinied. The unrest spread to the rest of the fleet and ultimately forced Hipper and Scheer to cancel the operation.

=== Internment, scuttling, and fate ===
Map of the scuttled ships showing Nürnberg (#19); click for a larger view

Following the capitulation of Germany in November 1918, most of the High Seas Fleet's ships, under the command of Reuter, were interned in the British naval base in Scapa Flow. Nürnberg was among the ships interned, and she departed Germany with the rest of the fleet on 19 November. Two days later, the ships arrived in the Firth of Forth, having been escorted across the North Sea by the Grand Fleet. Over the following days, the German ships were moved to Scapa Flow in smaller groups. Nürnberg and several other vessels left the Forth on 26 November, and arrived in Scapa the following day. Wegener thereafter returned to Germany, leaving the ship under the command of Kapitänleutnant (Captain Lieutenant) Günther Georgii. Over the following weeks, many men from the German ships were sent home, leaving skeleton crews to maintain the ships through internment.

The fleet remained in captivity during the negotiations that ultimately produced the Versailles Treaty. Reuter believed that the British intended to seize the German ships on 21 June 1919, which was the deadline for Germany to have signed the peace treaty. Unaware that the deadline had been extended to the 23rd, Reuter ordered the ships to be sunk at the next opportunity. On the morning of 21 June, the British fleet left Scapa Flow to conduct training maneuvers, and at 11:20 Reuter transmitted the order to his ships. British sailors used explosive charges to blast away Nürnberg's anchor chains so she could be dragged aground before she sank. During the post-Versailles discussions between the Allied powers over the fates of the surviving ships, Nürnberg was designated as a "propaganda ship", meaning that she would have to be used either for propaganda purposes or expended in tests. Britain received Nürnberg as part of its war reparations.

The ship was refloated in July and towed to Portsmouth, where she was converted into a target ship. The first trial, conducted with the monitor HMS Terror, was held on 5 November 1920; the monitor was moored just 370 m (400 yd) away to ensure hits. Coal was shifted to one side to make Nürnberg take on a list of 10 degrees to simulate the angle a shell would hit the cruiser at long range. Terror had been fitted with a 7.5 in (190 mm) gun and a 6 in (152 mm) gun for the purposes of the tests, which involved several different shell types for both calibers. Terror made hits on specific parts of the ship, including the conning tower, the belt armor, the upper deck, and the unarmored superstructure. Flooding from the belt hits caused the list to be reduced to 7.5 degrees. Another round of tests with Terror was held on 8 November, and this time Nürnberg's coal bunkers were flooded to bring her list to 20 degrees. After numerous hits, the ship was still aloat, and she was towed back to Portsmouth. On 7 July 1922, the battlecruiser Repulse sank Nürnberg off the Isle of Wight at a depth of 62 m (203 ft), about halfway between Poole, Great Britain, and Cherbourg, France. The wreck lies on its side.
