= Ludwig von Reuter =

19/20th-century German naval officer

- Ludwig von Reuter in 1919
- Born: 9 February 1869; Guben, Prussia
- Died: 18 December 1943 (aged 74); Potsdam, Prussia, Germany
- Military career
- Allegiance: German Empire; Germany
- Branch: Imperial German Navy; Reichsmarine
- Service years: 1885–1920
- Rank: Admiral
- Commands: SMS Loreley; SMS Yorck; SMS Derfflinger; IV Scouting Group; II Scouting Group; I Scouting Group; High Seas Fleet
- Battles: World War I; Battle of Dogger Bank; Battle of Jutland; Second Battle of Heligoland Bight; Scuttling of the German fleet at Scapa Flow

Hans Hermann Ludwig von Reuter (9 February 1869 – 18 December 1943) was a German admiral who commanded the High Seas Fleet when it was interned at Scapa Flow in the Orkney Islands at the end of World War I. On 21 June 1919 he ordered the scuttling of the German fleet at Scapa Flow to prevent the British from seizing the ships.

== Early life ==
Reuter was born in Guben into a Prussian military family. His father, a colonel in the army, was killed in the Franco-Prussian War. His mother was an unacknowledged illegitimate daughter of Ernst II of Saxe-Coburg and Gotha, making Reuter a second cousin to George V. In 1885, he became a cadet in the Imperial German Navy at the instigation of his mother. As a midshipman at the age of 17, he was promoted to Unterleutnant zur See in 1888. By 1910, he was a Kapitän zur See, commanding the armored cruiser SMS Yorck.

== World War I ==
Two months after the outbreak of World War I, he was made captain of the battlecruiser SMS Derfflinger, which he also commanded during the Battle of Dogger Bank. In September 1915, he became commodore and commanding officer of the Fourth Scouting Group of five light cruisers (SMS Stuttgart, SMS Hamburg, SMS München, SMS Stettin, SMS Frauenlob), leading the group during the Battle of Jutland. Promoted to Konteradmiral in November 1916, he was placed in command of the Second Reconnaissance Group, a fleet of six light cruisers including his flagship SMS Königsberg. He commanded the group during the mine sweeping operation that led to the Second Battle of Heligoland Bight in November 1917. Faced with a surprise attack by a numerically superior force of British ships, he successfully withdrew his group under fire to the protection of the battleships SMS Kaiser and SMS Kaiserin. Reuter was appointed commander, Reconnaissance Forces and I Scouting Group in August 1918, succeeding Franz von Hipper.

=== Scuttling of the German High Seas Fleet at Scapa Flow ===
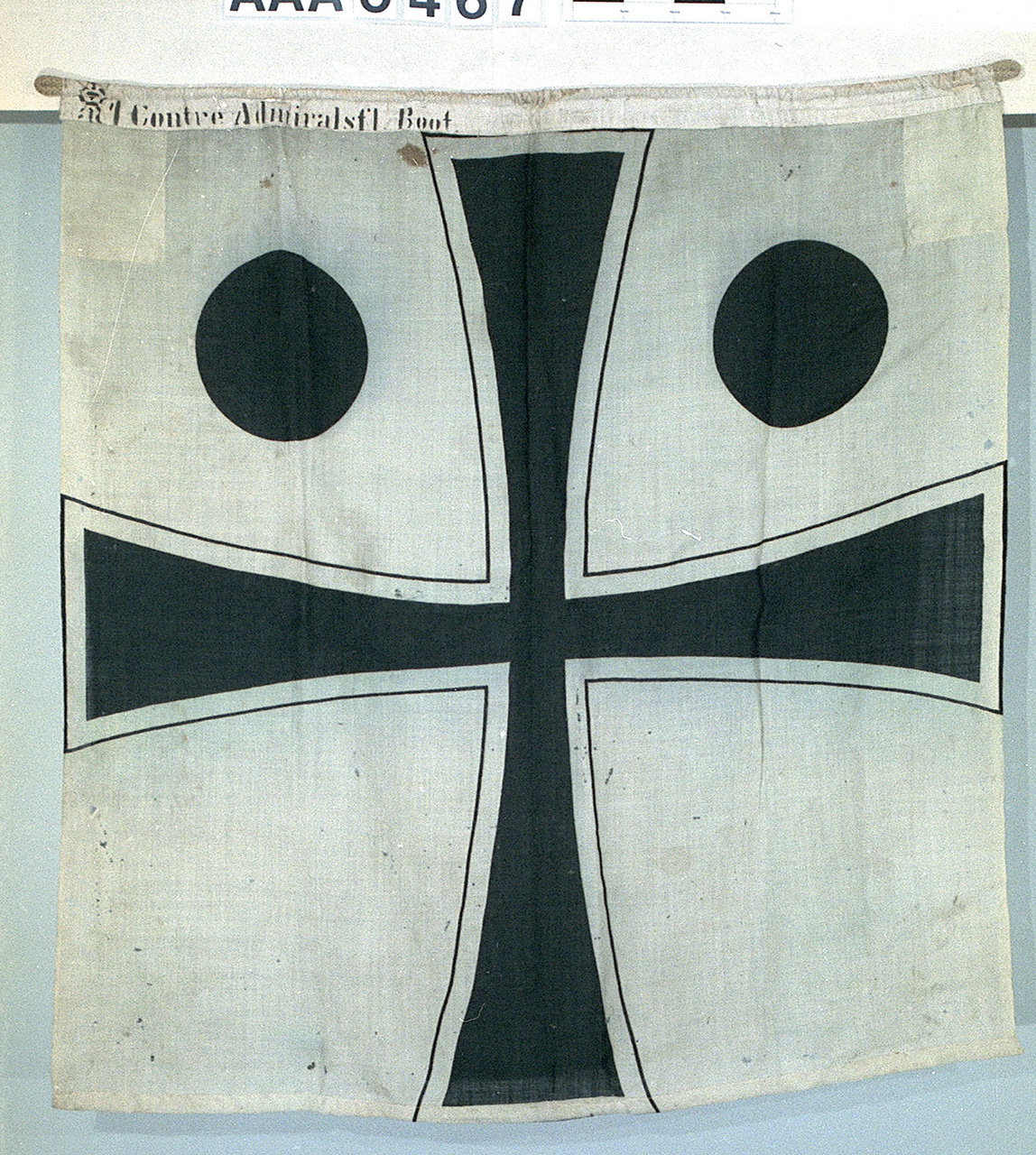
von Reuter's command flag, reputedly removed from the Hindenburg after her scuttling at Scapa Flow

After the armistice that ended World War I, Konteradmiral von Reuter was requested to take command of the fleet that was to be interned at Scapa Flow until its final disposition would be decided at Versailles. Admiral Franz von Hipper, commander-in-chief of the High Seas Fleet, had refused to lead his ships into internment. He thus protested against the seizing of the fleet by Britain and its relocation to a British war harbour instead of a neutral location, as had been agreed initially.

As the final deadline neared for the German delegation to sign the Treaty of Versailles, Reuter anticipated that his ships would be handed over to the victorious Allies. To prevent this, he ordered all 74 ships scuttled on 21 June 1919, using an unusual flag signal previously agreed upon. Unbeknownst to the British, all ships had long ago been prepared for this action. Within five hours, 10 battleships, five battlecruisers, five light cruisers, and 32 destroyers sank in Scapa Flow. The battleship SMS Baden, the three light cruisers SMS Emden, SMS Nürnberg, and SMS Frankfurt, and 14 destroyers were beached when British servicemen on guard duty were able to intervene in time and tow them to shallow water. Only four destroyers remained afloat. Nine German naval personnel were killed and 16 wounded by panicked guards either aboard their ships or on their lifeboats while rowing towards land (including Walter Schumann, the captain of SMS Markgraf).

Reuter was vilified in Britain and made a prisoner of war, along with the other 1,773 officers and men of the fleet's remaining rump crews. In Germany, he was celebrated as a hero who had protected the honour of the navy. While most of the imprisoned Germans were soon returned to Germany, Reuter was among several who remained imprisoned in Britain. He was eventually released and finally returned to Germany in late January 1920.

== Later life ==
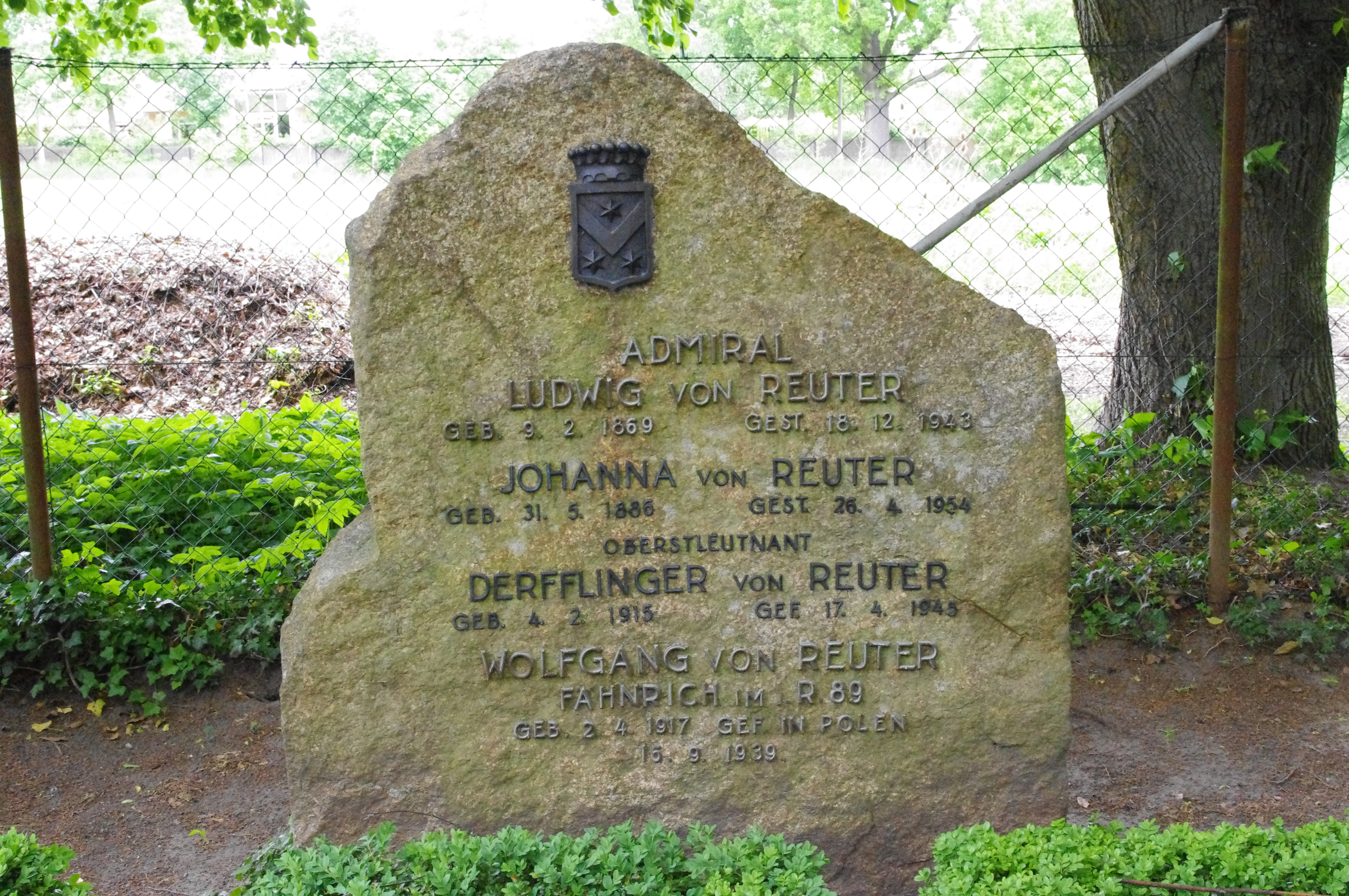
Grave Cemetery Bornstedt- Potsdam No. E 32-34

Five months after his return from Britain, Reuter was requested to hand in his resignation from the Navy. The Treaty of Versailles forced Germany to drastically reduce the size of its navy leaving Reuter without a suitable command, given his rank and age. Moving to Potsdam, he eventually became a state councillor. In 1921 he wrote a book on the scuttling of the High Fleet, Scapa Flow – Das Grab der deutschen Flotte (Scapa Flow: Grave of the German Fleet). On 29 August 1939, he was made full admiral to celebrate the 25th anniversary of the Battle of Tannenberg.

== Death ==
Reuter died in Bornstedt-Potsdam of a heart attack on 18 December 1943.

== Awards and decorations ==
- Order of the Red Eagle 2nd class with oak leaves and swords
- Order of the Prussian Crown 2nd class
- Knight's Cross with swords of the House Order of Hohenzollern
- Iron Cross 1st and 2nd class
- Prussian Service Award Cross
- Military Merit Order of Bavaria, 3rd class with swords
- Hanseatic Cross of Hamburg
- Friedrich-August-Kreuz, 1st class
- Commander's Cross 2nd class with swords of the Albert Order
