= 15 cm SK L/45 =

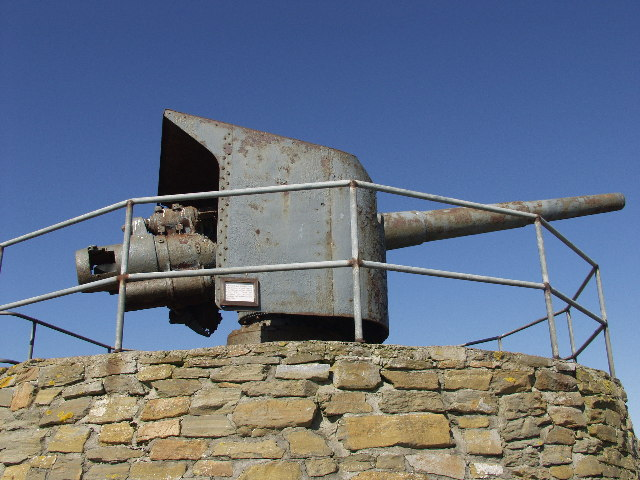
- Gun salvaged from SMS Bremse, at the Scapa Flow Visitor Centre, Hoy, Orkney
- Type: Naval gun Railroad gun Coastal artillery
- Place of origin: German Empire

Service history
- In service: 1908—45
- Used by: German Empire; Nazi Germany; Ottoman Empire
- Wars: World War I World War II

Production history
- Designer: Krupp
- Designed: 1906
- Manufacturer: Krupp
- Produced: 1908

Specifications
- Mass: 5,730 kilograms (12,630 lb)
- Length: 6.71 metres (22 ft 0 in)
- Barrel length: 6.32 metres (20 ft 9 in)L/45
- Shell: separate loading quick fire
- Caliber: 149.1 millimetres (5.87 in)
- Breech: horizontal sliding-wedge
- Recoil: Hydro-spring
- Elevation: See table
- Traverse: −150° to +150°
- Rate of fire: 5-7 rpm
- Muzzle velocity: 840 metres per second (2,800 ft/s)
- Maximum firing range: See table

The 15 cm SK L/45 (Note: SK - Schnelladekanone (quick loading cannon); L - Länge in Kaliber (length in caliber)) was a German naval gun used in World War I and World War II.

== Naval service ==
The 15 cm SK L/45 was a widely used naval gun on many classes of World War I dreadnoughts and cruisers in both casemates and turrets. It was constructed of an A tube and two layers of hoops with a Krupp horizontal sliding-wedge breech block. During World War I a few pre-war cruisers that were armed with 10.5 cm guns were rearmed with these weapons. In World War II the 15 cm SK L/45 was widely used as coastal artillery and as primary armament on German auxiliary cruisers.

Ship classes that carried the 15 cm SK L/45 include:

- Bremen class
- Brummer class
- Graudenz class
- Kolberg class
- Magdeburg class
- Pillau class

15 cm SK L/45 mounts
Type of mount	Designation	Weight	Elevation	Range (during World War I)	Ship classes
Single pedestal mounts in casemates	MPL C/06	15,770 kg (34,770 lb)	−7° to +20°	14.9 km (9.3 mi) at 20°	Nassau, Helgoland, and Kaiser classes, SMS Von der Tann, Moltke class, SMS Blücher
Single pedestal mounts in casemates	MPL C/06.11	16,533 kg (36,449 lb)	−10° to +19°	13.5 km (8.4 mi) at +19	König class, Seydlitz, Derfflinger class, Lützow
Single pedestal mounts in casemates	MPL C/13	17,950 kg (39,570 lb)	−8.5° to +19	13.5 km (8.4 mi) at +19	Bayern class, Hindenburg, Mackensen class
Single pedestal mounts in casemates	MPL C/13 mod	18,350 kg (40,450 lb)	−8.5° to +22	15.8 km (9.8 mi) at +22	Wartime modification to MPL C/13
Single pedestal mounts in open half-shields	MPL C/14	16,185 kg (35,682 lb)	−10° to +22°	15.8 km (9.8 mi) at +22	Wiesbaden class, Königsberg class
Single pedestal mounts in open half-shields	MPL C/16	17,116 kg (37,734 lb)	−10° to +27°	16.8 km (10.4 mi) at +27	Cöln class, SMS Emden
Single pedestal mounts in open half-shields	MPL C/16 mod		−10° to +30	17.6 km (10.9 mi) at +30	wartime modification to MPL C/16

== Ammunition ==
Ammunition was of separate loading quick fire type. The projectiles were 61 cm (2 ft) long with a single bagged charge which weighed 13–14 kg (29–31 lb).

The gun was able to fire:

- Armor piercing 45.3 kg (100 lb)
- High explosive base fuzed 45.3 kg (100 lb)
- High explosive nose fuzed 45.3 kg (100 lb)
- Common shell 45.3 kg (100 lb)

== Coast defense gun ==
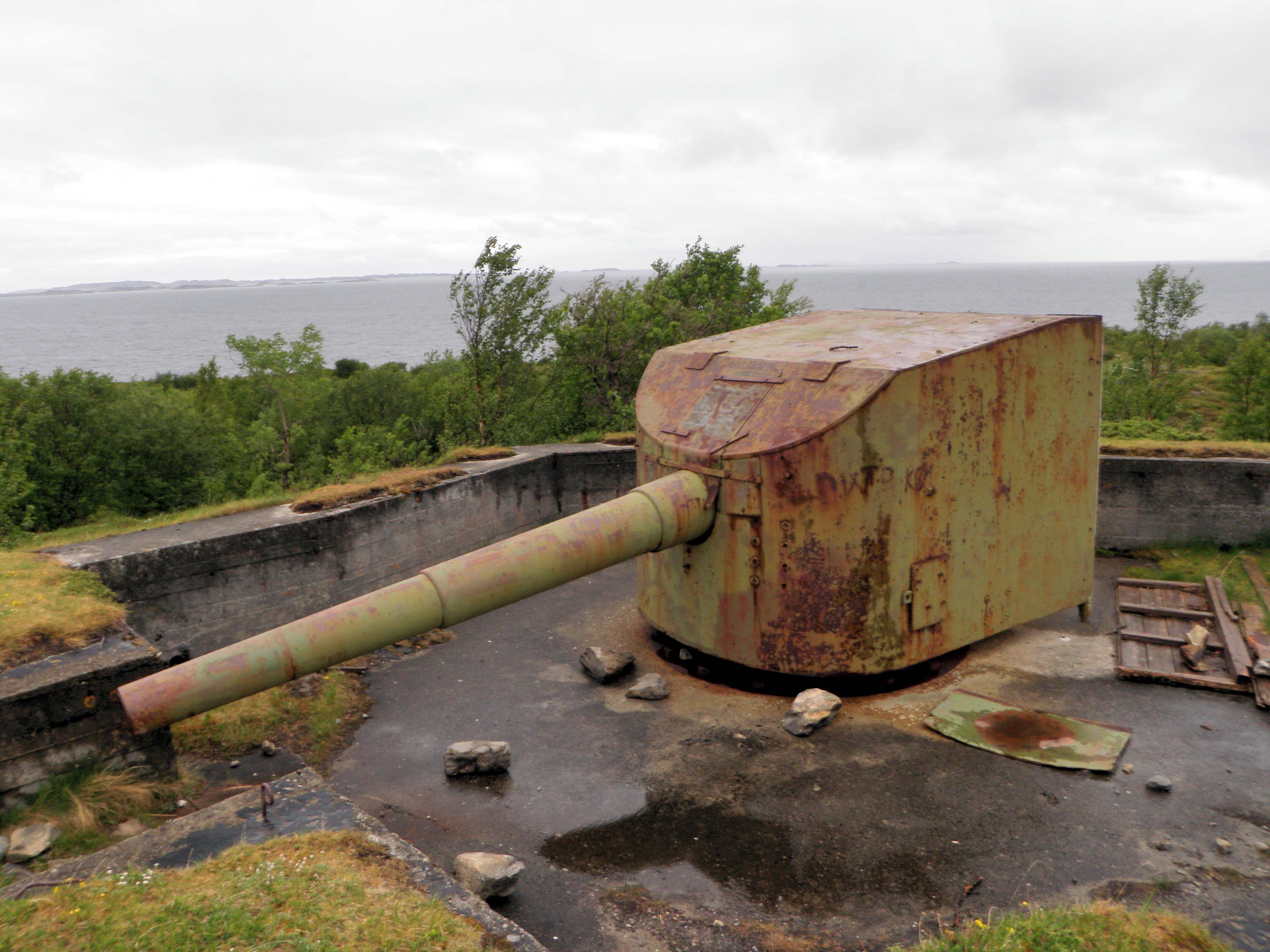
15 cm SK L/45 coastal artillery gun at Nord-Arnøya, Gildeskål Municipality, Norway

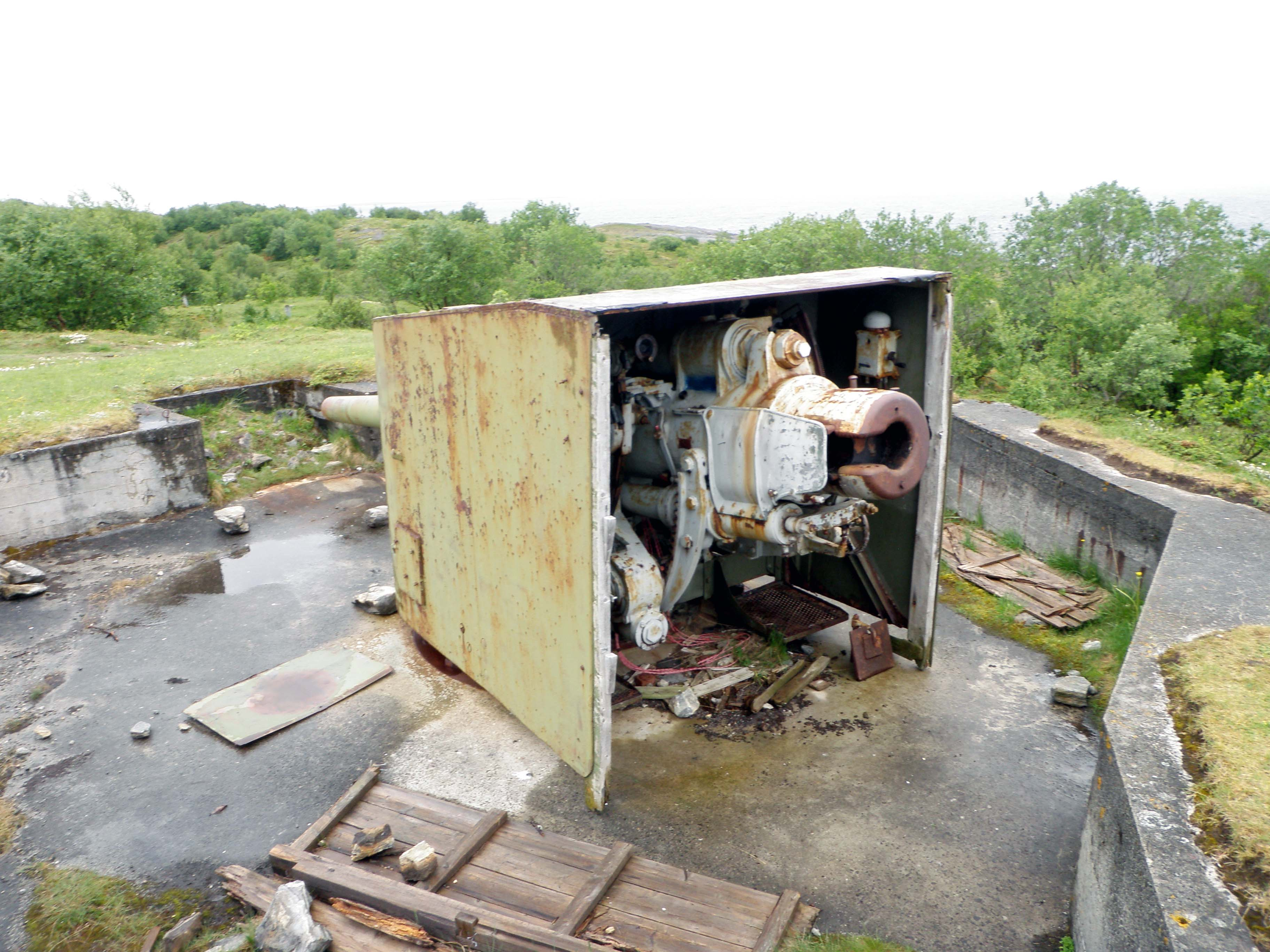
Rear view of the above pictured gun

The same gun was used for coast defense duties in concrete emplacements after World War I. One example was 3./Marine-Artillerie Abteilung 604 ("3rd Battery of Naval Artillery Battalion 604") in Jersey. They show it using 44 kilograms (97 lb) shells with a range of 18,000 metres (20,000 yd)

== Railroad gun ==
It was also used as a railroad gun during World War I.

== See also ==
=== Weapons of comparable role, performance and era ===
- BL 6 inch Mk XII naval gun British equivalent
