= HMS Umpire (1917) =

Destroyer of the Royal Navy

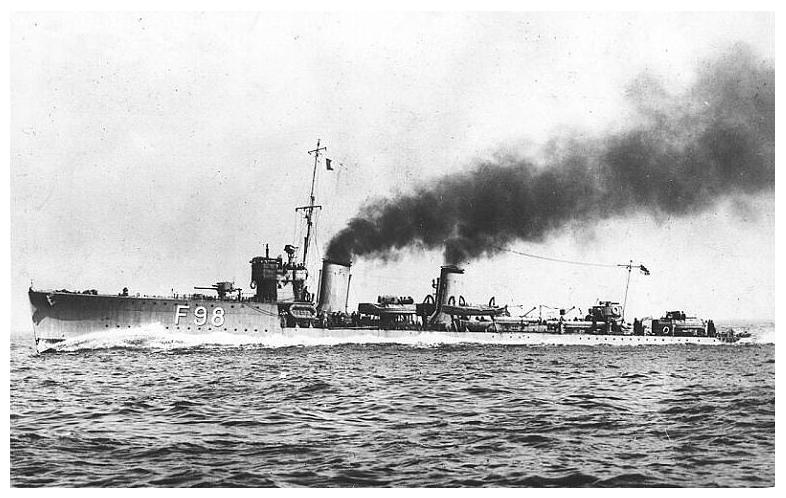
- HMS Tower during sea trialsSister ship HMS Tower during sea trials

History

United Kingdom
- Name: HMS Umpire
- Namesake: Umpire
- Builder: William Doxford & Sons, Sunderland
- Launched: 9 June 1917
- Commissioned: August 1917
- Out of service: 7 January 1930
- Fate: Sold to be broken up

General characteristics
- Class & type: Modified Admiralty R-class destroyer
- Displacement: 1,035 long tons (1,052 t) (normal)
- Length: 276 ft (84.1 m) (o.a.)
- Beam: 27 ft (8.2 m)
- Draught: 11 ft (3.4 m)
- Propulsion: 3 White-Forster boilers; 2 geared Brown-Curtis steam turbines, 27,000 shp (20,000 kW)
- Speed: 36 knots (41.4 mph; 66.7 km/h)
- Range: 3,450 nmi (6,390 km) at 15 kn (28 km/h)
- Complement: 82
- Armament: 3 × single QF 4-inch (102 mm) Mark IV guns; 1 × single 2-pdr 40 mm (1.6 in) AA gun; 2 × twin 21 in (533 mm) torpedo tubes

HMS Umpire was a modified Admiralty R-class destroyer which served with the Royal Navy. The Modified R class added attributes of the Yarrow Later M class to improve the capability of the ships to operate in bad weather. Launched on 9 June 1917, the ship operated with the Grand Fleet during World War I as an escort to a squadron of light cruiser and took part in the Second Battle of Heligoland Bight. After the Armistice, the vessel continued to serve and gained fame when, after rescuing the charity's founder from drowning in 1924, the name of the first house opened by what would become Veterans Aid was named H10 after the destroyer's pennant number. Umpire was sold to be broken up in 1930.

== Design and description ==
Umpire was one of eleven modified R-class destroyers ordered by the British Admiralty in March 1916 as part of the Eighth War Construction Programme. The design was a development of the existing R class, adding features from the Yarrow Later M class which had been introduced based on wartime experience. The forward two boilers were transposed and vented through a single funnel, enabling the bridge and forward gun to be placed further aft. Combined with hull-strengthening, this improved the destroyers' ability to operate at high speed in bad weather.

Umpire was 276 feet (84.1 m) long overall and 265 feet (80.8 m) long between perpendiculars, with a beam of 27 feet (8.2 m) and a draught of 11 feet (3.4 m). Displacement was 1,035 long tons (1,052 t) normal and 1,090 long tons (1,110 t) at deep load. Power was provided by three Yarrow boilers feeding two Brown-Curtis geared steam turbines rated at 27,000 shaft horsepower (20,000 kW) and driving two shafts, to give a design speed of 36 knots (67 km/h; 41 mph). Two funnels were fitted. A total of 296 long tons (301 t) of fuel oil were carried, giving a design range of 3,450 nautical miles (6,390 km; 3,970 mi) at 15 knots (28 km/h; 17 mph).

Armament consisted of three single 4-inch (102 mm) Mk V QF guns on the ship's centreline, with one on the forecastle, one aft on a raised platform and one between the funnels. Increased elevation extended the range of the gun by 1,800 metres (2,000 yd) to 11,000 metres (12,000 yd). A single 2-pounder 40 mm (1.6 in) "pom-pom anti-aircraft gun was carried on a platform between two twin mounts for 21 in (533 mm) torpedoes. The ship had a complement of 82 officers and ratings.

== Service ==
Umpire was launched on 9 June 1917 by William Doxford & Sons of Sunderland. The vessel was named after the umpire in the game of cricket. On commissioning in August that year, the ship joined the Thirteenth Destroyer Flotilla of the Grand Fleet and served there to the end of the conflict.

The vessel formed part of the escort for the Sixth Light Cruiser Squadron based at Rosyth. On 15 October, the destroyer accompanied the Sixth Light Cruiser Squadron in an attack on German minesweepers with aircraft carrier Furious. No enemy ships were sunk. On 16 November, the destroyer was at sea again accompanying Furious and Courageous. On the following day, Umpire took part in the Second Battle of Heligoland Bight in support of the First Cruiser Squadron, led by Vice-Admiral Trevylyan Napier. Along with sister ships Urchin and Ursa, the destroyer was one of the first to launch torpedoes at the German ships in the action. The vessel also rescued aviation pioneer Jack McCleery when he ditched his aircraft on 24 September 1918.

When the Grand Fleet was disbanded, Umpire was transferred to the Fifth Destroyer Flotilla of the Home Fleet, under the flag of King George V However, as the Royal Navy returned to a peacetime level of strength, both the number of ships and personnel needed to be reduced to save money. The destroyer was recommissioned in reserve on 23 October 1919. The ship continued to serve and, while operating in Malta on 2 November 1924, Umpire rescued Gwendolin Huggins, who later went on to found Veterans Aid. She named the charity's first house H10 in honour of the ship. On 21 September 1928, the ship escorted the Sultan of Oman to a naval demonstration. However, soon after, the destroyer was decommissioned and sold on 7 January 1930 to Metal Industries to be broken up in Charlestown.

== Pennant numbers ==
Pennant number	Date
F94	January 1917
F26	January 1918
F02	January 1919
H10	January 1922

== Bibliography ==
- Bush, Steve; Warlow, Ben (2021). Pendant Numbers of the Royal Navy: A Complete History of the Allocation of Pendant Numbers to Royal Navy Warships & Auxiliaries. Barnsley: Seaforth Publishing. ISBN 978-1-526793-78-2.
- Colledge, J.J.; Warlow, Ben (1987). Ships of the Royal Navy: The Complete Record of All Fighting Ships of the Royal Navy. Annapolis: Naval Institute Press. ISBN 978-1-93514-907-1.
- Dittmar, F.J.; Colledge, J.J. (1972). British Warships 1914–1919. Shepperton: Ian Allan. ISBN 978-0-71100-380-4.
- Dunn, Clive; Dunn, Gillian (2014). Sutherland in the Great War. Havertown, UK: Pen and Sword. ISBN 978-1-47384-658-6.
- Friedman, Norman (2009). British Destroyers: From Earliest Days to the Second World War. Barnsley, UK: Seaforth Publishing. ISBN 978-1-84832-049-9.
- Manning, Thomas Davys & Walker, Charles Frederick (1959). British Warship Names. London: Putnam.
- March, Edgar J. (1966). British Destroyers: A History of Development, 1892–1953; Drawn by Admiralty Permission From Official Records & Returns, Ships' Covers & Building Plans. London: Seeley Service. OCLC 164893555.
- Moretz, Joseph (2002). The Royal Navy and the Capital Ship in the Interwar Period. London: Routledge. ISBN 978-0-71465-196-5.
- Newbolt, Henry (1931). "History of the Great War: Naval Operations Vol. V, April 1917 to November 1918 (Part 1 of 4)". London: Longmans, Green and Co.
- Parkes, Oscar; Prendergast, Maurice (1969). Jane's Fighting Ships 1919. Newton Abbott: David & Charles. OCLC 907574860.
- Preston, Antony (1985). "Great Britain and Empire Forces". In Gardiner, Robert; Gray, Randal (eds.). Conway's All the World's Fighting Ships 1906–1921. London: Conway Maritime Press. pp. 1–104. ISBN 978-0-85177-245-5.
- Warner, Guy (2011). World War One Aircraft Carrier Pioneer : the Story and Diaries of Captain J M McCleery RNAS RAF. Barnsley: Pen & Sword Books. ISBN 978-1-84884-255-7.
