= HMS Ursa (1917) =

Destroyer of the Royal Navy

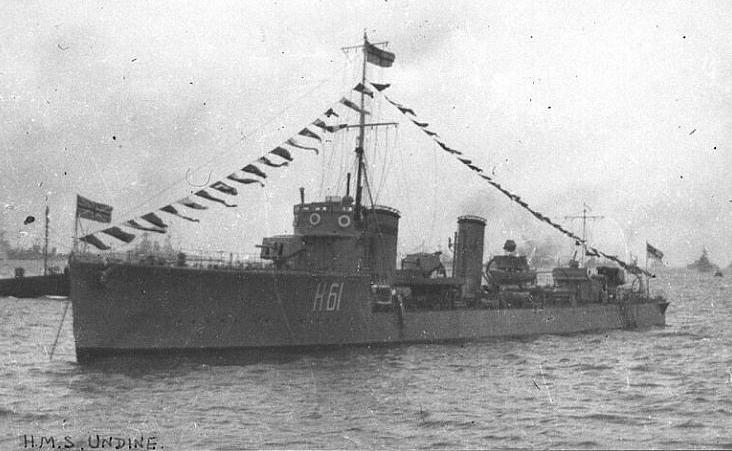
- Sister ship HMS Undine

History

United Kingdom
- Name: HMS Ursa
- Namesake: Ursa, the Lain name for bear
- Ordered: March 1916
- Builder: Palmers Shipbuilding and Iron Company, Jarrow
- Launched: 23 July 1917
- Completed: 16 October 1917
- Out of service: 13 July 1926
- Fate: Sold to be broken up

General characteristics
- Class & type: Modified Admiralty R-class destroyer
- Displacement: 1,035 long tons (1,052 t) (normal)
- Length: 276 ft (84.1 m) (o.a.)
- Beam: 27 ft (8.2 m)
- Draught: 11 ft (3.4 m)
- Propulsion: 3 Yarrow boilers; 2 geared Parsons steam turbines, 27,000 shp (20,000 kW)
- Speed: 36 knots (41.4 mph; 66.7 km/h)
- Range: 3,450 nmi (6,390 km) at 15 kn (28 km/h)
- Complement: 82
- Armament: 3 × single QF 4-inch (102 mm) Mark IV guns; 1 × single 2-pdr 40 mm (1.6 in) AA gun; 2 × twin 21 in (533 mm) torpedo tubes

HMS Ursa was a modified Admiralty R-class destroyer that served in the Royal Navy during the First World War. The Modified R class added attributes of the Yarrow Later M class to improve the capability of the ships to operate in bad weather. Launched in 1917, the vessel saw service as part of the Grand Fleet. The destroyer took part in the Second Battle of Heligoland Bight while being commanded by Commander John Tovey, who later became Admiral of the Fleet and led the successful action against the battleship Bismark. The vessel was also one of the first destroyers to launch a torpedo at the enemy during the battle. After the war, Ursa was transferred to the Home Fleet, but was sold to be broken up in 1926.

== Design and development ==
Ursa was one of eleven Modified R-class destroyers ordered by the British Admiralty in March 1916 as part of the Eighth War Construction Programme. The design was a development of the existing R class, adding features from the Yarrow Later M class which had been introduced based on wartime experience. The forward two boilers were transposed and vented through a single funnel, enabling the bridge and forward gun to be placed further aft. Combined with hull-strengthening, this improved the destroyer's ability to operate at high speed in bad weather.

Ursa was 276 feet (84.1 m) long overall and 265 feet (80.8 m) long between perpendiculars, with a beam of 27 feet (8.2 m) and a draught of 11 feet (3.4 m). Displacement was 1,035 long tons (1,052 t) normal and 1,085 long tons (1,102 t) at deep load. Power was provided by three Yarrow boilers feeding two Brown-Curtis geared steam turbines rated at 27,000 shaft horsepower (20,000 kW) and driving two shafts, to give a design speed of 36 knots (67 km/h; 41 mph). Two funnels were fitted. A total of 296 long tons (301 t) of fuel oil were carried, giving a design range of 3,450 nautical miles (6,390 km; 3,970 mi) at 15 knots (28 km/h; 17 mph).

Armament consisted of three single 4-inch (102 mm) Mk V QF guns on the ship's centreline, with one on the forecastle, one aft on a raised platform and one between the funnels. Increased elevation extended the range of the gun by 1,800 metres (2,000 yd) to 11,000 metres (12,000 yd). A single 2-pounder 40 mm (1.6 in) "pom-pom anti-aircraft gun was carried on a platform between two twin mounts for 21 in (533 mm) torpedoes. The ship had a complement of 82 officers and ratings.

== Construction and careers ==
Laid down by Palmers Shipbuilding and Iron Company in Jarrow, Ursa was launched on 23 July 1917 and completed on 16 October. The vessel was the first of the name. On commissioning, Ursa joined the Thirteenth Destroyer Flotilla of the Grand Fleet, On 28 September 1917, Commander John Tovey took over command of the vessel, a position that he held until 2 April 1918.

On 17 November 1917, Ursa took part in the Second Battle of Heligoland Bight in support of the 1st Cruiser Squadron, led by Vice-Admiral Trevylyan Napier in Courageous. Leading a destroyer force that included sisterships Urchin and Umpire, as well as Nerissa, the destroyer was one of the first to launch torpedoes at the German ships in the action. It was while commanding Ursa that Tovey was awarded the Croix de Guerre "for distinguished services rendered during the war". At the end of World War I, the destroyer was still part of the Thirteenth Destroyer Flotilla under the cruiser Champion.

When the Grand Fleet was disbanded at the end of the First World War, Ursa was transferred to the Home Fleet, under the Flag of King George V, remaining with the battleship on reserve at Portsmouth from 13 December 1919. In 1923, the Navy decided to retire many of the older destroyers in preparation for the introduction of newer and larger vessels. Ursa was sold to J. Smith on 13 July 1926 and broken up.

== Pennant numbers ==
Pennant number	Date
F10	January 1918
F05	January 1919
H63	January 1922
