= HMS Moresby =

British M-Class destroyer, WW1

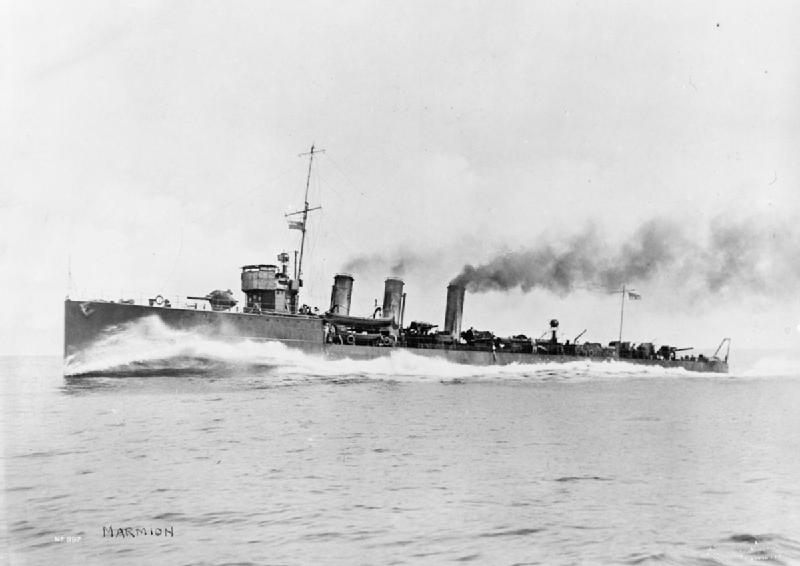
- Sistership HMS Marmion

History

United Kingdom
- Name: HMS Moresby
- Namesake: Fairfax Moresby
- Ordered: September 1914
- Builder: J. Samuel White, East Cowes
- Yard number: 1456
- Laid down: 1 January 1915
- Launched: 20 November 1915
- Completed: 7 April 1916
- Out of service: 9 May 1921
- Fate: Sold to be broken up

General characteristics
- Class & type: Admiralty M-class destroyer
- Displacement: 1,004 long tons (1,020 t) (normal); 1,028 long tons (1,044 t) (full load)
- Length: 265 ft (80.8 m) (o.a.)
- Beam: 26 ft 7 in (8.1 m)
- Draught: 8 ft 7 in (2.62 m)
- Installed power: 3 White-Forster boilers, 25,000 shp (19,000 kW)
- Propulsion: Parsons steam turbines, 3 shafts
- Speed: 34 knots (39.1 mph; 63.0 km/h)
- Range: 2,280 nmi (4,220 km; 2,620 mi) at 17 kn (31 km/h; 20 mph)
- Complement: 80
- Armament: 3 × QF 4-inch (102 mm) Mark IV guns (3×1); 1 × single 2-pounder (40-mm) "pom-pom" Mk. II anti-aircraft gun (1×1); 4 × 21 in (533 mm) torpedo tubes (2×2)

HMS Moresby was a Admiralty M-class destroyer which served with the Royal Navy during the First World War. The M class were an improvement on the previous L-class, capable of higher speed. Originally laid down as HMS Marlion by J. Samuel White at East Cowes on the Isle of Wight, the vessel was renamed before being launched on 20 November 1915. At the Battle of Jutland, the destroyer was initially cover for the seaplane tender Engadine but soon joined the action as part of a flotilla led by the light cruiser Champion. Moresby attacked the German fleet with torpedoes, initially unsuccessfully targeting the dreadnought battleship Markgraf and, near the end of the battle, unleashing another which narrowly missed the battlecruiser Von der Tann. In March 1918, the destroyer sank U-110 with the destroyer Michael. After the war, the destroyer was placed in reserve and eventually sold to be broken up on 9 May 1921.

== Design and development ==
Moresby was one of sixteen Admiralty M-class destroyers ordered by the British Admiralty in September 1914 as part of the First War Construction Programme. The M-class was an improved version of the earlier L-class destroyers, required to reach a higher speed in order to counter rumoured German fast destroyers. The remit was to have a maximum speed of 36 knots (67 km/h; 41 mph) and, although the eventual design did not achieve this, the greater performance was appreciated by the navy. It transpired that the German ships did not exist.

Moresby was 265 feet (80.8 m) long overall, with a beam of 26 feet 7 inches (8.1 m) and a draught of 8 feet 7 inches (2.6 m). Displacement was 1,004 long tons (1,020 t) normal and 1,028 long tons (1,044 t) full load. Power was provided by three White-Forster boilers feeding Parsons steam turbines rated at 25,000 shaft horsepower (19,000 kW) and driving three shafts, which gave a design speed of 34 knots (63 km/h; 39 mph). Three funnels were fitted. The destroyer carried 296 long tons (301 t) of oil, giving a design range of 3,450 nautical miles (6,390 km; 3,970 mi) at 15 knots (28 km/h; 17 mph).

Armament consisted of three single QF 4-inch (102 mm) Mk IV guns on the ship's centreline, with one on the forecastle, one aft on a raised platform and one between the middle and aft funnels. Torpedo armament consisted of two twin mounts for 21 in (533 mm) torpedoes. A single QF 2-pounder 40 mm (1.6 in) "pom-pom" anti-aircraft gun was mounted between the torpedo tubes. After February 1916, for anti-submarine warfare, Moresby was equipped with two chutes for two depth charges. The number of depth charges carried increased as the war progressed. The ship had a complement of 80 officers and ratings.

== Construction and career ==
Marlion was laid down by J. Samuel White at East Cowes on the Isle of Wight on 1 January 1915 with the yard number 1456, and launched on 20 November. The ship was completed on 7 April 1916 and joined the Grand Fleet. By this time, the ship's name had already been changed to Moresby. to honour Admiral Fairfax Moresby. The vessel was deployed as part of the Grand Fleet, joining the Thirteenth Destroyer Flotilla.

On 30 May 1916, the destroyer sailed with the Grand Fleet to confront the German High Seas Fleet in the Battle of Jutland. Moresby was one of fourteen M-class destroyers that were allocated to form part of the screen to protect the battlecruisers of the fleet. However, along with sistership Onslow, the destroyer was detached to cover the seaplane tender Engadine. The tender had launched a Short Type 184 to observe the German fleet movements and was stationary waiting for it to return. After the reconnaissance seaplane had been recovered, Lieutenant commander Jack Tovey, who commanded Onslow, led the two destroyers back into the action.

Moresby rejoined the flotilla and, led by the light cruiser Champion, steamed towards the German High Seas Fleet. The two fleets met and Moresby was soon in the centre of the action. The destroyer attacked the German battlecruisers, and shortly after 17:10 on 31 May, launched a torpedo at the dreadnought battleship Markgraf. The destroyer also narrowly escaped an attack from the light cruiser Wiesbaden, two torpedoes streaking past, one ahead and the other astern. As the battlesfleets broke apart, Champion sped away in pursuit of the German fleet, leaving the majority of the destroyers behind, with only Moresby and Obdurate able to keep up.

The small flotilla sought for the main German fleet, and at 02:15 the following day turned westwards towards gunfire. They saw four German cruisers with their attendant destroyers. However, through the mist, Moresby saw what were initially taken to be four pre-dreadnought battleships. The destroyer sped off and launched a torpedo at a range of 3,700 yards (3,400 m) at the third ship in the line. The destroyer reported a hit and then withdrew. In fact, two of the vessels were German battlecruisers, and the torpedo narrowly missed Von der Tann. Instead, the torpedo hit the torpedo boat V4. Returning to the British lines, the three ships were spotted by the German torpedo boats G40 and V45, which launched torpedoes, but both sides escaped without recording a hit.

The destroyer was transferred to Buncrana, Ireland, with the Second Destroyer Flotilla during the latter part of 1917. The vessel served as a convoy escort, and on 2 October 1917, was also involved in the ultimately unsuccessful efforts to save the armoured cruiser Drake. On 15 March the following year, the destroyer was patrolling with sistership Michael when they surprised U-110 shortly after the submarine had sunk the ocean liner Amazon. The submarine dived but was brought back to the surface when the destroyers attacked with depth charges and was finished by gunfire. Six of the crew were rescued.

After the Armistice of 11 November 1918 that ended the war, the Royal Navy returned to a peacetime level of strength and both the number of ships and personnel needed to be reduced to save money. Moresby was taken out of active service and initially placed alongside fifty-two other destroyers in reserve at Nore. On 9 May 1921, the vessel was sold to Thos. W. Ward of Grays and was broken up in 1923.

== Pennant numbers ==
Penant numbers
Pennant number	Date
HC1	1914
F02	1917
H27	1918
