= HMS Urchin (1917) =

Destroyer of the Royal Navy

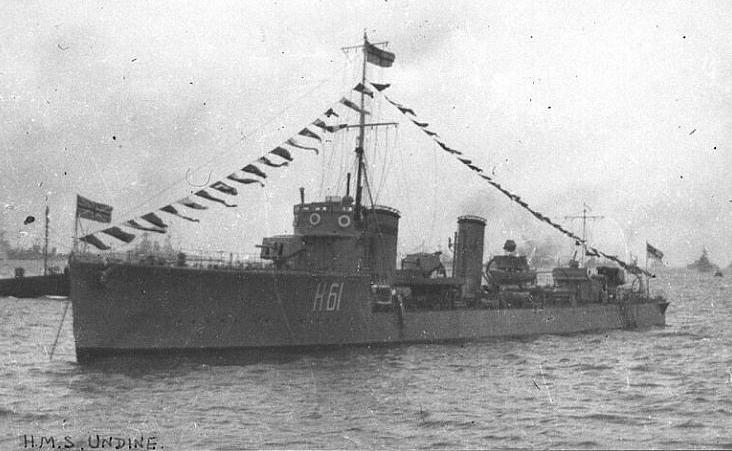
- Sister ship HMS Undine

History

United Kingdom
- Name: HMS Urchin
- Namesake: Sea urchin
- Ordered: March 1916
- Builder: Palmers Shipbuilding and Iron Company, Jarrow
- Launched: 7 June 1917
- Completed: August 1917
- Out of service: 7 January 1930
- Fate: Sold to be broken up

General characteristics
- Class & type: Modified Admiralty R-class destroyer
- Displacement: 1,035 long tons (1,052 t) (normal)
- Length: 276 ft (84.1 m) (o.a.)
- Beam: 27 ft (8.2 m)
- Draught: 11 ft (3.4 m)
- Propulsion: 3 Yarrow boilers; 2 geared Brown-Curtis steam turbines, 27,000 shp (20,000 kW)
- Speed: 36 knots (41.4 mph; 66.7 km/h)
- Range: 3,450 nmi (6,390 km) at 15 kn (28 km/h)
- Complement: 82
- Armament: 3 × single QF 4-inch (102 mm) Mark IV guns; 1 × single 2-pdr 40 mm (1.6 in) AA gun; 2 × twin 21 in (533 mm) torpedo tubes

HMS Urchin was a Modified Admiralty R-class destroyer which served with the Royal Navy during the First World War. The Modified R class added attributes of the Yarrow Later M class to improve the capability of the ships to operate in bad weather. The destroyer was the third ship in the Navy to be named after the sea urchin and the first in the class to be built by Palmers in Jarrow. Launched in 1917, Urchin served with the Grand Fleet, seeing action in the Second Battle of Heligoland Bight. After the war, the destroyer was remained in service until being retired and sold to be broken up in 1930.

== Design and development ==
Urchin was one of eleven Modified R-class destroyers ordered by the British Admiralty in March 1916 as part of the Eighth War Construction Programme. The design was a development of the existing R class, adding features from the Yarrow Later M class which had been introduced based on wartime experience. The forward two boilers were transposed and vented through a single funnel, enabling the bridge and forward gun to be placed further aft. Combined with hull-strengthening, this improved the destroyers' ability to operate at high speed in bad weather.

Urchin was 276 feet (84.1 m) long overall and 265 feet (80.8 m) long between perpendiculars, with a beam of 27 feet (8.2 m) and a draught of 11 feet (3.4 m). Displacement was 1,035 long tons (1,052 t) normal and 1,085 long tons (1,102 t) at deep load. Power was provided by three Yarrow boilers feeding two Brown-Curtis geared steam turbines rated at 27,000 shaft horsepower (20,000 kW) and driving two shafts, to give a design speed of 36 knots (67 km/h; 41 mph). Two funnels were fitted. A total of 296 long tons (301 t) of fuel oil were carried, giving a design range of 3,450 nautical miles (6,390 km; 3,970 mi) at 15 knots (28 km/h; 17 mph).

Armament consisted of three single 4-inch (102 mm) Mk V QF guns on the ship's centreline, with one on the forecastle, one aft on a raised platform and one between the funnels. Increased elevation extended the range of the gun by 1,800 metres (2,000 yd) to 11,000 metres (12,000 yd). A single 2-pounder 40 mm (1.6 in) "pom-pom anti-aircraft gun was carried on a platform between two twin mounts for 21 in (533 mm) torpedoes. The ship had a complement of 82 officers and ratings.

== Construction and career ==
Laid down by Palmers Shipbuilding and Iron Company at Jarrow at Greenock, Urchin was launched on 7 June 1917 and completed in August. The vessel was the first of the class to be completed by the yard and was followed by sister ship Ursa. On commissioning, Urchin joined the Thirteenth Destroyer Flotilla of the Grand Fleet.

On 17 November 1917, Urchin took part in the Second Battle of Heligoland Bight in support of the 1st Cruiser Squadron, led by Vice-Admiral Trevylyan Napier in Courageous. The destroyer formed part of small flotilla led by Ursa, commanded by John Tovey, that attacked the German ships with torpedoes.

At the end of the First World War, the destroyer was still part of the Thirteenth Destroyer Flotilla under the cruiser Champion. but was reduced on 8 February 1919. On 6 August 1928, the destroyer transported a Spanish naval delegation to the Cowes Regatta. Soon after the vessel was retired and, on 7 January 1930, Urchin was sold to Metal Industries of Charlestown, Fife to be broken up.

== Pennant numbers ==
Pennant number	Date
F99	January 1917
F04	January 1918
H62	January 1922
