= HMS Engadine (1911) =

1911 British seaplane tender

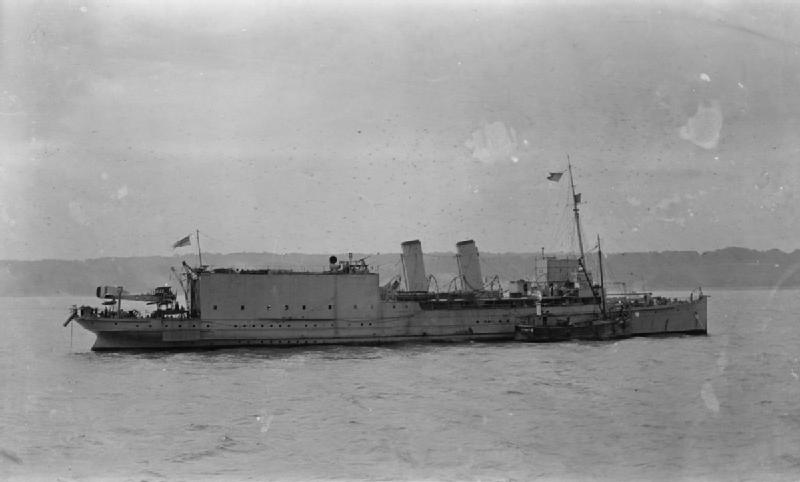
- Engadine at anchor, 1915, with a Short Brothers seaplane on her stern

History

United Kingdom
- Name: SS Engadine
- Owner: South East and Chatham Railway
- Builder: William Denny and Brothers, Dumbarton, Scotland
- Launched: 23 September 1911
- Completed: 1911
- Fate: Leased to Royal Navy, 11 August 1914

United Kingdom
- Name: HMS Engadine
- Acquired: 11 August 1914; February 1915 (purchased)
- Commissioned: 1 September 1914
- Fate: Sold back to owners, December 1919

United Kingdom
- Name: SS Engadine
- Owner: South East and Chatham Railway/Southern Railway
- Acquired: December 1919
- Fate: Sold, 1932

United States
- Owner: Fernandez Hermanos, Inc.
- Acquired: 1933
- Renamed: SS Corregidor
- Fate: Sunk by mine, 17 December 1941

General characteristics (as of 1918)
- Type: Seaplane carrier
- Tonnage: 1,676 gross register tons (GRT)
- Displacement: 2,550 long tons (2,590 t) (deep load)
- Length: 323 ft (98.5 m)
- Beam: 41 ft (12.5 m)
- Draught: 13 ft 8 in (4.2 m)
- Installed power: 13,800 shp (10,300 kW); 6 water-tube boilers
- Propulsion: 3 shafts; 3 steam turbines
- Speed: 21.5 knots (39.8 km/h; 24.7 mph)
- Range: 1,250 nmi (2,320 km; 1,440 mi) at 15 knots (28 km/h; 17 mph)
- Complement: 197
- Armament: 4 × 12-pounder 12 cwt guns; 2 × QF 3-pounder anti-aircraft guns
- Aircraft carried: 4 × seaplanes

HMS Engadine was a seaplane tender which served in the Royal Navy during the First World War. Converted from the packet ship SS Engadine, she was initially fitted with temporary hangars for three seaplanes for aerial reconnaissance and bombing missions in the North Sea. She participated in the Cuxhaven Raid in late 1914 before she began a more thorough conversion in 1915 that increased her capacity to four aircraft. Engadine was transferred to the Battle Cruiser Fleet in late 1915 and participated in the Battle of Jutland in 1916 when one of her aircraft flew the first heavier-than-air reconnaissance mission during a naval battle. She was transferred to the Mediterranean in 1918.

She was sold back to her original owners in 1919 and resumed her prewar role. Engadine was sold in 1933 to a Philippine company and renamed SS Corregidor. She was sunk with heavy loss of life by a mine in December 1941 during the invasion of the Philippines at the beginning of the Pacific War.

== Description ==
Engadine had an overall length of 323 feet (98.5 m), a beam of 41 feet (12.5 m), and a mean draught of 13 feet 8 inches (4.2 m). She displaced 2,550 long tons (2,590 t) at deep load and was rated at 1,676 gross register tons (GRT). Each of the ship's three sets of direct-drive steam turbines drove one propeller shaft. The ship's six boilers generated enough steam to produce 13,800 shaft horsepower (10,300 kW) from the turbines, enough for a designed speed of 21.5 knots (39.8 km/h; 24.7 mph). Engadine carried 400 tonnes (390 long tons) of coal, enough to give her a range of 1,250 nautical miles (2,320 km; 1,440 mi) at 15 knots (28 km/h; 17 mph).

== Construction and service ==
SS Engadine was laid down by William Denny and Brothers at their Dumbarton, Scotland shipyard as a fast packet for the South East and Chatham Railway's Folkestone-Boulogne run. The ship was launched on 23 September 1911 and completed later that year. She was requisitioned for service by the Admiralty on 11 August 1914, and was commissioned on 1 September after she was modified to handle seaplanes by Chatham Dockyard. Three canvas hangars were installed, one forward and two aft, and there was no flight deck, the aircraft being lowered onto the sea for takeoff and recovered again from the sea after landing by newly installed derricks. In 1918 her crew numbered 197 officers and ratings, including 53 aviation personnel.

Upon completion of the modifications on 1 September, Engadine was assigned to the Harwich Force along with the seaplane tenders Empress and Riviera. On Christmas Day 1914, nine aircraft from all three ships took part in the Cuxhaven Raid on hangars housing Zeppelin airships. Seven of the nine seaplanes successfully took off for the attack, but they inflicted little damage. Only three of the aircraft returned to be recovered, but the crews of the other three ditched safely and were recovered by a British submarine and the Dutch trawler Marta van Hattem. A notable member of Engerdine's crew was Robert Erskine Childers who served as an instructor in coastal navigation to newly trained pilots. He managed to extend his duties to include flying as a navigator and observer and participated in the raid, for which he was mentioned in despatches.

Engadine was purchased in February 1915 by the Admiralty and she was modified by Cunard at Liverpool from 10 February to 23 March 1915 with a permanent, four-aircraft, hangar in the rear superstructure and a pair of cranes were mounted at the rear of the hangar to hoist the seaplanes in and out of the water. Four quick-firing (QF) 12-pounder 12 cwt guns, (Note: "Cwt" is the abbreviation for hundredweight, 12 cwt referring to the weight of the gun.) each with 130 rounds, and two Vickers QF 3-pounder anti-aircraft guns, each with 65 rounds, were fitted for self-defence. She also carried a pigeon loft that housed carrier pigeons to be used by her aircraft if their Wireless was broken.

Upon completion of the conversion, she rejoined the Harwich Force; on 3 July, Engadine and Riviera attempted to launch aircraft to reconnoitre the River Ems and lure out a Zeppelin so that it could be attacked. Of Engadine's three Sopwith Schneider floatplanes that she attempted to launch, two wrecked on takeoff and the third was badly damaged. She was transferred to Vice Admiral David Beatty's Battlecruiser Fleet (BCF), based at Rosyth in October. Later that month Engadine carried out trials on high-speed towing of kite balloons for gunnery observations, although she generally served as a base ship for the fleet's seaplanes.

=== Battle of Jutland ===
On 30 May 1916, Engadine was attached to the 3rd Light Cruiser Squadron, commanded by Rear Admiral Trevylyan Napier, and carried two Short Type 184 and two Sopwith Baby floatplanes aboard. The two-seat Type 184s were intended for observation and were fitted with a low-power wireless while the Babies were intended to shoot down Zeppelins. Engadine accompanied the cruisers when the Battlecruiser Fleet sortied from Rosyth that evening to intercept the German High Seas Fleet. For a time on 31 May she was actually leading the BCF and may have been one of the first ships to spot the oncoming Germans. Her position in the vanguard was dictated by the requirement for smooth water to successfully launch her aircraft; turbulent water from ships' wakes was enough to ruin a take off attempt. She would also have to come to a complete stop to hoist her aircraft over the side and prepare it for launch, a process that took at least 20 minutes at anchor. Thus she could launch her floatplane in unruffled water and then fall back among the main body of the fleet.

Beatty ordered Engadine to make a search to the north-northeast at 14:40 and she sailed through the BCF before turning north-east to find calmer water. At 15:07 Lieutenant Frederick Rutland took off in his Type 184 and his observer signalled Engadine that they had spotted three German cruisers and five destroyers at 15:30. These were ships from the II Scouting Group, leading the battlecruisers of Vice Admiral Franz von Hipper. This was the first time that a heavier-than-air aircraft had carried out a reconnaissance of an enemy fleet in action. After a few other spot reports were transmitted, the aircraft's fuel line ruptured around 15:36 and Rutland was forced to put his aircraft down. He was able to repair it and signalled that he was ready to take off again, but he was ordered to taxi to the carrier on the surface. The aircraft reached the ship at 15:47 and it was hoisted aboard by 16:04. By this time, a pair of destroyers, Moresby and Onslow, that had been ordered to protect Engadine while she was stationary had reached her. Engadine attempted to relay the spot reports to Beatty's flagship and the flagship of the 5th Battle Squadron, but was unsuccessful. She trailed Beatty's force during the "Run to the South", during which time her two escorts were detached and again when they reversed course during the "Run to the North".

The 14,000-long-ton (14,000 t) Warrior, an armoured cruiser, had been crippled by numerous hits by German battleships around 18:30 and fell in with Engadine 10 minutes later. The former's rudder had been jammed full over and she continued to turn in tight circles until her steam was exhausted. At 19:45 Engadine attempted to take her in tow, but the jammed rudder prevented that until it was trained amidships. By 21:30 she was making 8 knots (15 km/h; 9.2 mph) while her turbines were making revolutions for 19 knots (35 km/h; 22 mph). Early the following morning Warrior's progressive flooding had worsened and she was sinking. Captain Vincent Molteno ordered his ship abandoned after Engadine came alongside to take them off at 08:00. One of Warrior's guns punctured Engadine's hull below the waterline as the former ship rolled in the moderate seas, but this was quickly patched. About 675 officers and ratings successfully made it to the much smaller Engadine which had to quickly distribute them to prevent her from capsizing. Among these were about 30 seriously wounded men who were transferred across in their stretchers; one man fell off his stretcher between the ships, but was rescued by Rutland against orders. For his bravery he was awarded the First Class Albert Medal for Lifesaving in gold and briefly became the only living recipient. The transfer was completed before 09:00 and Warrior sank shortly afterwards.

Engadine remained with the Battlecruiser Force until early 1918 when she was transferred to the Mediterranean Fleet. She was based out of Malta, conducting anti-submarine patrols, for the remainder of the war.

=== Postwar career ===
She was sold back to her original owners, the South Eastern and Chatham Railway, in December 1919 and resumed her former role as a cross-Channel ferry. Engadine was transferred to the Southern Railway in 1923 when the British railways were consolidated. Passing through the hands of a ship broker, she was sold to Fernandez Hermanos, Inc. in the Philippines in 1933 and renamed SS Corregidor.

==== Sinking ====
At 22:00 on 16 December 1941, Corregidor left its dock in Manila in total darkness, loaded to overcapacity with Filipino civilians seeking to escape to the southern Philippines after the war had started. It has been estimated that between 1,200 and 1,500 people were on board, including approximately 150 Philippine soldiers, 7 Americans, 5 Philippine legislators, and hundreds of college students who were traveling home after their schools had closed. Also aboard were military supplies as well most of the artillery complement (2.95-inch mountain guns) of the Visayan-Mindanao Force of the Philippine Army. The owners of the ship failed to inform the Navy's Inshore Patrol of the ship's plan to leave Manila Bay.

Although Captain Apolinar Calvo of the Corregidor had prior experience navigating the mined entrance to Manila Bay (the mines had been in place since July), the Navy had changed its procedures on that day. Rather than post a gunboat near the safe channel as they had in days previous, lighted buoys were used to guide boats through. As the Corregidor sailed close to the island of Corregidor to pass through the channel at around 01:00, the ship was observed turning toward the electrically-controlled minefield. Some officers posted at the Army's Seaward Defense Command headquarters on the island recommended that the mines be temporarily disarmed so that the ship could pass through the minefield. A number of accounts state that Seaward Defense Commander Colonel Paul Bunker ordered that the mines be kept active.

"The Army and the Filipino skippers had long been butting heads. All the channels out of Manila Bay had been mined for many months. At this time, the mining was strictly up to date and operational. At 1 AM on 16 December, the SS Corregidor, carrying 760 refugees, attempted to go thru the minefield without asking clearance. This request would have been granted. The Lieutenant who was on watch in the mine casement, on sighting the SS Corregidor called his superior, who in turn, called the seaward defense commander, Col. Bunker, requesting information as to whether he should de-activate the contact mines in the channel. With a lifetime of experience with the Filipino, going back to the '98 Insurrection, Col. Bunker said 'No!' My first knowledge of this affair came when my duty watch called me at 12:55 AM. The Corregidor had struck one of our mines and in the four or five minutes it took to reach my battery command post, the vessel had sunk. ... Thereafter, we had no trouble with unauthorized Filipino boats attempting to traverse the channel"

— Captain George Steiger: A POW Diary

When the Corregidor entered the minefield, there was a large explosion on the starboard side of the vessel. The overcrowded ship quickly began to sink, with many people trapped below-deck. Survivors stated that the ship sank so quickly that there was no time for large-scale panic to set in. Searchlights from Corregidor Island illuminated the scene which aided the rescue effort. Sailors of MTB Squadron 3 posted at Sisiman Cove heard the explosion and left on three PT boats (PT-32, PT-34 and PT-35) to investigate. When the boats arrived they found survivors in the water and were able to retrieve 282 survivors. Seven of the rescued passengers later died from their injuries. (Note: Gordon gives 296 survivors.)

The incident was never investigated due to the Japanese invasion. Later, some Army officers reported that the remote-controllable mines were set to the safety position immediately after the explosion occurred. The total number of victims is unknown. It has been estimated that 900–1,200 lost their lives. Among the dead were the captain and most of the crew, two of the legislators, and one of the American passengers. At the time, the sinking of the Corregidor was the most significant maritime disaster in Philippine history. (Note: The Japanese submarine I-124 had laid mines outside the harbor, not inside.)

== See also ==
- Gerald Livock
- Mount Engadine
