= John Tovey, 1st Baron Tovey =

Royal Navy Admiral of the Fleet (1885–1971)

Admiral of the Fleet The Lord Tovey GCB KBE DSO
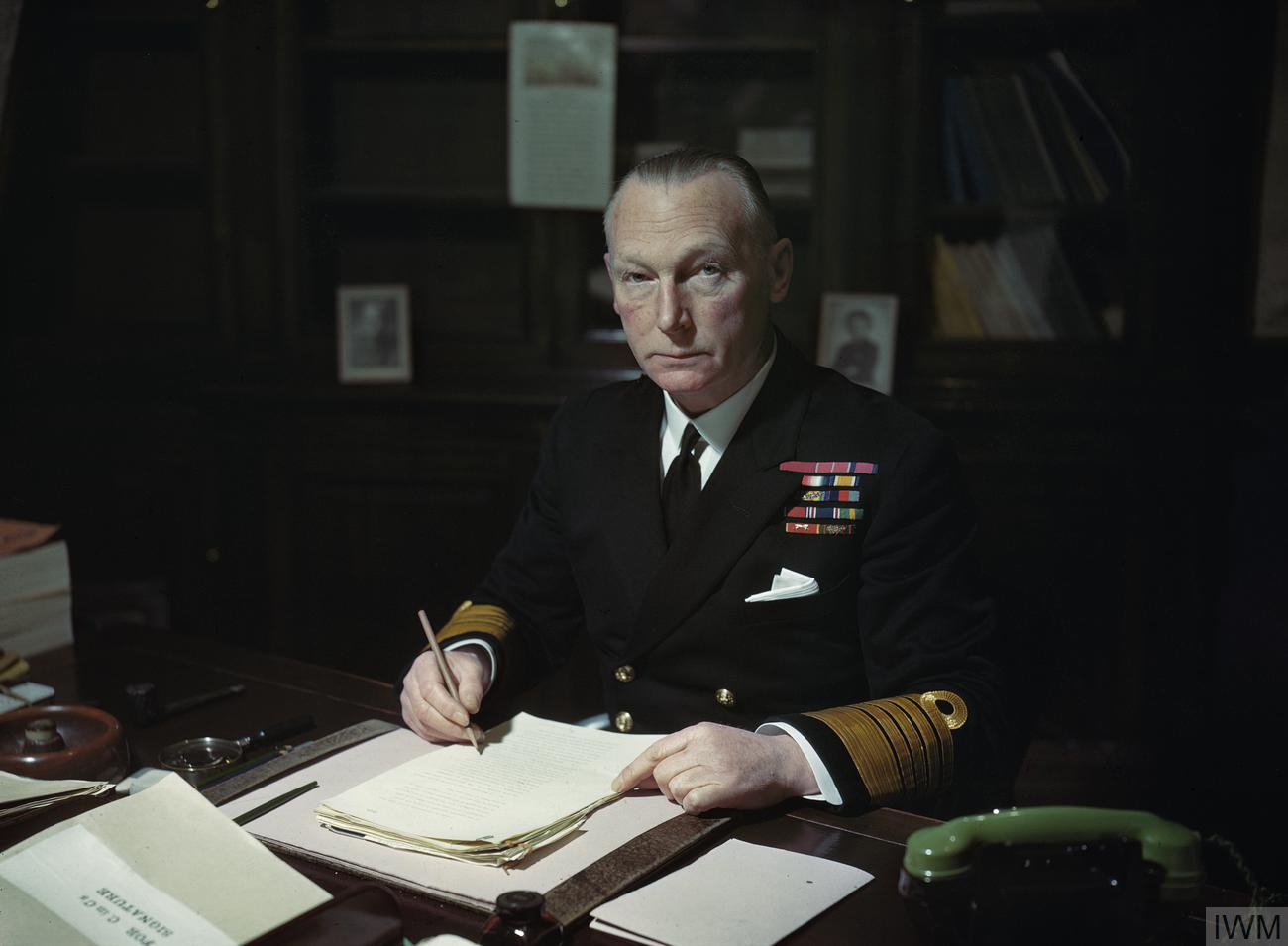
- Tovey c. 1943–45
- Born: 7 March 1885; Rochester, Kent
- Died: 12 January 1971 (aged 85); Funchal, Madeira
- Military career
- Allegiance: United Kingdom
- Branch: Royal Navy
- Service years: 1900–1946
- Rank: Admiral of the Fleet
- Nickname: Jack
- Commands: Commander-in-Chief, The Nore (1943–46); Home Fleet (1940–43); 1st Battle Squadron (1940); 7th Cruiser Squadron (Mediterranean) (1940); Destroyer Flotillas, Mediterranean Fleet (1938–40); RN Barracks, Chatham (1935–37); HMS Rodney (1932–34); 6th Destroyer Flotilla (1926–27); HMS Campbell (1926–27); 8th Destroyer Flotilla (1924–26); HMS Bruce (1924–26); HMS Seawolf (1922–24); HMS Wolfhound (1918–19); HMS Ursa (1917–18); HMS Onslow (1916–17); HMS Jackal (1915–16)
- Conflicts: First World War; Second World War
- Awards: Knight Grand Cross of the Order of the Bath; Knight Commander of the Order of the British Empire; Distinguished Service Order; Mentioned in Despatches

Admiral of the Fleet John Cronyn Tovey, 1st Baron Tovey, GCB, KBE, DSO (7 March 1885 – 12 January 1971), sometimes known as Jack Tovey, was a Royal Navy officer. During the First World War he commanded the destroyer HMS Onslow at the Battle of Jutland and then commanded the destroyer Ursa at the Second Battle of Heligoland Bight. During the Second World War he initially served as Second-in-Command of the Mediterranean Fleet in which role he commanded the Mediterranean Fleet's Light Forces (i.e. cruisers and destroyers). He then served as Commander-in-Chief of the Home Fleet and was responsible for orchestrating the pursuit and destruction of the Bismarck. After that he became Commander-in-Chief, The Nore with responsibility for controlling the east coast convoys and organising minesweeping operations.

== Early life and career ==
Tovey was born on 7 March 1885 at Borley Hill, Rochester, Kent, the youngest child (of eleven) of Lieutenant Colonel Hamilton Tovey, RE, and Maria Elizabeth Goodhue. He was educated at Durnford School, Langton Matravers (joining the school shortly before another future British admiral, Geoffrey Oliver) and as a naval cadet in the training ship Britannia at Dartmouth (15 January 1900 – 15 May 1901). Tovey's parents spent much time abroad and as a result, Durnford and its headmaster, Thomas Pellatt, were a significant and happy influence upon the young Tovey. He excelled at sports, playing well at cricket for Durnford and he was a schoolboy international footballer and later played golf for the Royal Navy.

Tovey passed out of Britannia with four months' time awarded (effectively an improvement in seniority) and entered the Royal Navy on 15 May 1901 as a midshipman. A month later he was posted to the battleship Majestic, flagship of the Channel Squadron, Vice-Admiral Arthur Wilson. He remained in Majestic until June 1902, when he transferred to the cruiser HMS Ariadne, flagship on the North America and West Indies Station. Tovey passed his Seamanship examination (1st class) and on his promotion to sub-lieutenant on 15 July 1904, he was transferred from Ariadne. In his time as a midshipman, his performance ratings had all been good or better with comments such as "zealous" and "painstaking", although not without criticisms ("Painstaking & steady" and "Manner bad with the men").

In 1905, Tovey attended courses in gunnery, torpedo, navigation and pilotage. In November, he was appointed to the flagship, HMS Exmouth, at the request of Admiral Sir Arthur Wilson, the Commander-in-Chief of the Channel Fleet. Tovey's length of service on Exmouth is unclear, but he was promoted to lieutenant on 15 July 1906.

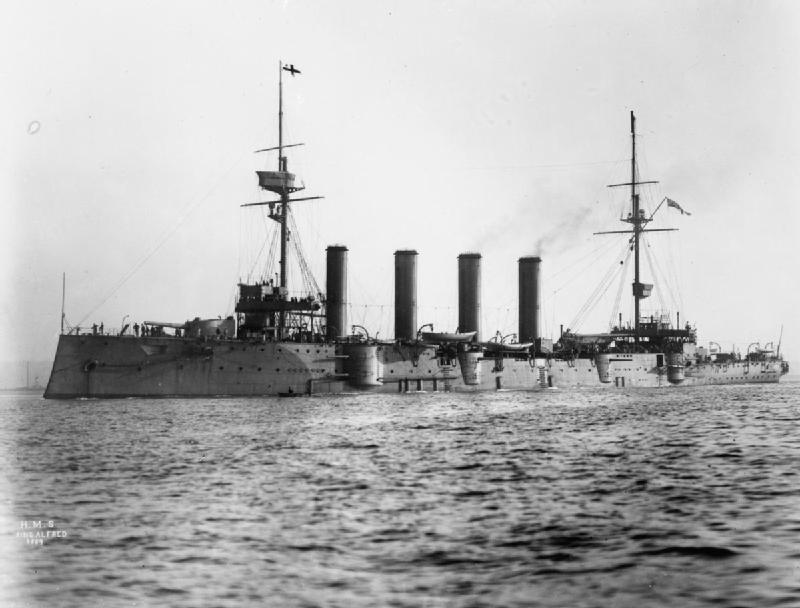
The armoured cruiser HMS King Alfred to which Tovey was appointed in 1908

Tovey was appointed, on 18 May 1908, to the armoured cruiser HMS King Alfred, on the China Station, where he served for two years. During 1910, 1911 and 1912, there was a series of appointments to ships of differing types. (Note: HMS Racer, training ship for Royal Navy College Osborne, May 1910 HMS Bellona, scout cruiser in the Atlantic Fleet, June 1911 HMS Patrol, scout cruiser in the Home Fleet, November 1911 HMS Russell, battleship, August 1912)

At the start of 1913, Tovey was posted to HMS Vivid (the naval barracks at Devonport) for trials of HMS Amphion and subsequently served on Amphion from 2 April 1913. He was promoted to lieutenant commander on 15 July 1914.

== First World War ==
Tovey continued to serve on Amphion as its first lieutenant until she was mined and sunk on 6 August 1914 (the first British warship to be sunk in the First World War). He was subsequently posted to the destroyer HMS Faulknor.

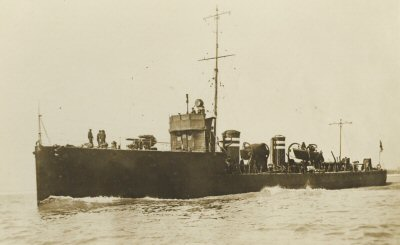
The destroyer HMS Jackal, which Tovey commanded, in pre-war livery

Tovey received his first command on 13 January 1915, when he was appointed to the destroyer HMS Jackal, which as part of the 1st Destroyer Flotilla, took part in the Battle of Dogger Bank on 24 January. He subsequently commanded HMS Onslow (from 7 May 1916) at the Battle of Jutland on 31 May. Onslow and another destroyer, HMS Moresby, had escorted the seaplane carrier HMS Engadine, but later Onslow became involved in action, first against German battlecruisers, then in an attack on the damaged German cruiser SMS Wiesbaden (Note: Onslow's torpedo hit on Wiesbaden was one of only five British torpedo hits during Jutland.) and finally on a line of enemy battleships. Onslow had been severely damaged during the attack on the Wiesbaden, nonetheless, Tovey ordered that the remaining torpedoes be fired at the battleships, although no hits were scored. Despite heavy shelling, Onslow was towed to safety by HMS Defender (herself also damaged) and eventually both ships reached Aberdeen. (Note: The Report on the Battle by Admiral Beatty stated that: "Defender, whose speed had been reduced to 10 knots, while on the disengaged side of the battle cruisers, was struck by a shell which damaged her foremost boiler, but closed Onslow and took her in tow. Shells were falling all round them during this operation, which, however, was successfully accomplished. During the heavy weather of the ensuing night the tow parted twice, but was resecured. The two struggled on together until 1pm 1 June, when Onslow was transferred to tugs. I consider the performances of these two destroyers to be gallant in the extreme, and I am recommending Lieutenant-Commander J. C. Tovey of Onslow, and Lieutenant Commander Palmer of Defender, for special recognition..." (The Beatty Papers, vol. 1, B.McL. Ranft, ed, Navy Records Society, 1989, p 323). Both officers were awarded DSOs.) As a result of this action, Tovey was promoted to commander (effective 30 June 1916), Mentioned in Dispatches and subsequently awarded the DSO in 1919.

Tovey remained on Onslow until October 1917, when he transferred to command the new destroyer HMS Ursa, which he commanded at the Second Battle of Heligoland Bight in November 1917. It was during this time that he was awarded the Croix de Guerre. In April 1918, Tovey took command of another new destroyer, HMS Wolfhound, and was also appointed to the staff of the Captain Superintendent Torpedo-Boat Destroyers; these appointments lasted until June 1919, after the war's end.

== Inter-war years ==
In June 1919, Tovey attended the Senior Officers' Technical Course at the Royal Naval College, Greenwich, for a year; subsequently he was appointed to the Naval Staff Operations Division at the Admiralty for a further two years. His next sea appointment, in August 1922, was to command HMS Seawolf, which he held until his promotion to captain on 31 December 1923. In August 1924, Tovey was briefly appointed as Captain (D), 2nd Destroyer Flotilla, for exercises before attending a course at the Senior Officers' School, Sheerness.

At the end of 1924, Tovey was appointed as captain (D) to command HMS Bruce and the 8th Destroyer Flotilla. He commanded the 8thDF and other flotillas, in turn, until he attended the Imperial Defence Course, for a year from mid January 1927, at the Imperial Defence College. This was immediately followed by the Senior Officers' Technical Course at Portsmouth and from February 1928 to April 1930, Tovey was assistant director of Tactical School, followed by yet another shore appointment at the Admiralty as naval assistant to the Second Sea Lord.

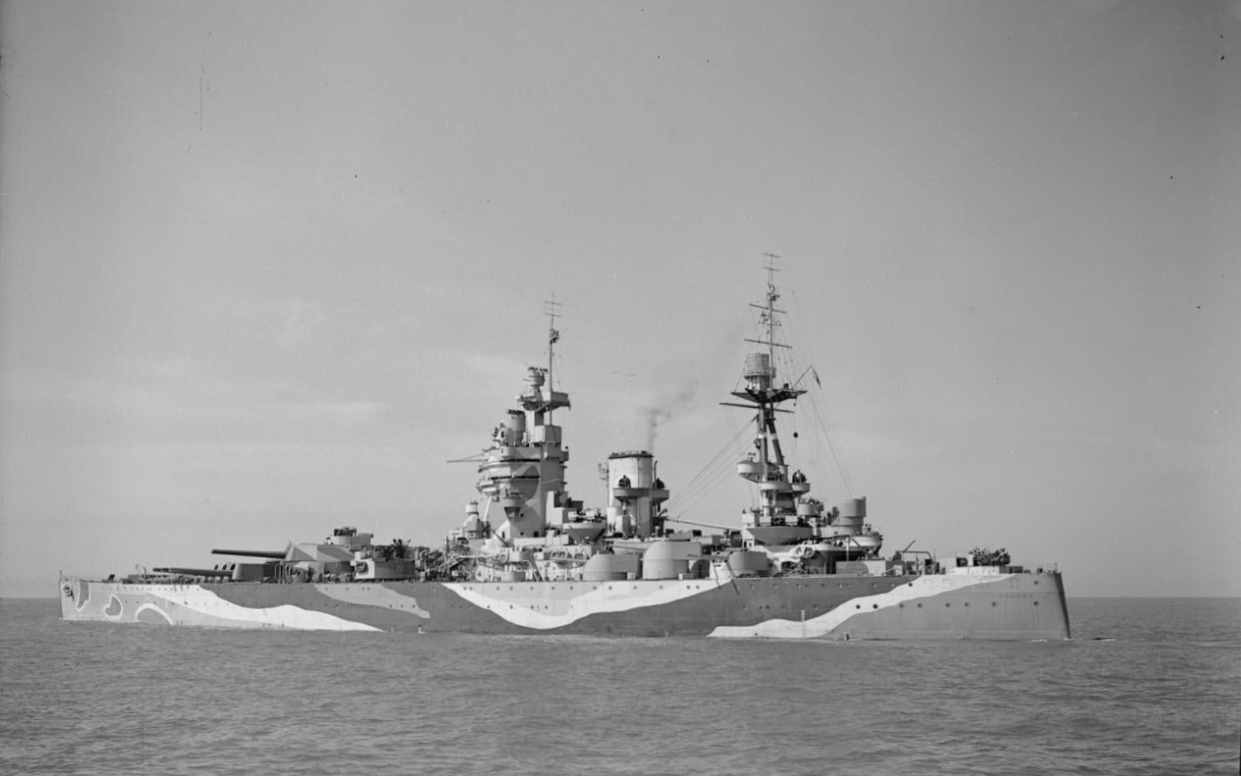
The battleship HMS Rodney after refitting at Liverpool

After five years ashore, Tovey was given command of the battleship HMS Rodney in April 1932. This ship had been heavily involved in the recent Invergordon mutiny and elements of its crew were among the most vociferous protestors, and Tovey was seen as a "safe pair of hands" to restore the battleship's efficiency. Tovey quickly transformed the ship's crew into an efficient and confident unit and in his confidential personnel report, Admiral Sir John Kelly judged that Tovey "... has brought his ship to a high state of fighting efficiency". He stayed with Rodney until August 1934.

In October, Tovey attended a Senior Officers' course and in January 1935, he was appointed as commodore (2nd rank) (at the time "commodore" was not a substantive rank) to command the Naval Barracks at Chatham, an important depot and training establishment involved in the rapid naval expansion of the 1930s. When promoted to rear admiral on 27 August 1935, he continued at Chatham until he attended a Senior Officers Tactical Course from September 1937 and a Senior Officers' War Course at the Royal Naval War College, Greenwich, in December 1937. Until February 1938, Tovey also acted as Naval ADC to the King.

Tovey had been nominated in early 1935 to be rear admiral (D), commanding the Destroyer Flotillas of the Mediterranean Fleet, the appointment not taking effect until early 1938. Once in post at Malta, Tovey's role involved interventions in the Spanish Civil War and at Haifa as well as the command and administrative roles of bringing the destroyer flotillas to peak efficiency. He was promoted to vice admiral on 3 May 1939.

== Second World War ==
For some months after Britain and Germany had declared war, the Mediterranean was a backwater. Italy remained nominally neutral with her fleet as only a potential threat and France maintained a powerful naval force as a counter to the Italians. As a result, British naval forces were reduced as units were transferred to meet immediate threats elsewhere and Tovey's command was reduced to five elderly Australian Scott-class and V and W-class destroyers (Note: The five were HMAS Stuart (leader), Vampire, Vendetta, Voyager and Waterhen.)

When Italy declared war in June 1940, Tovey was commanding the Mediterranean Fleet's Light Forces (i.e. cruisers and destroyers) and had become Second-in-Command of the Mediterranean Fleet, under Andrew Cunningham. As Italy's participation became more certain, the Mediterranean Fleet had been reinforced and by June, Tovey commanded nine cruisers and around twenty-five destroyers, with his flag in HMS Orion.

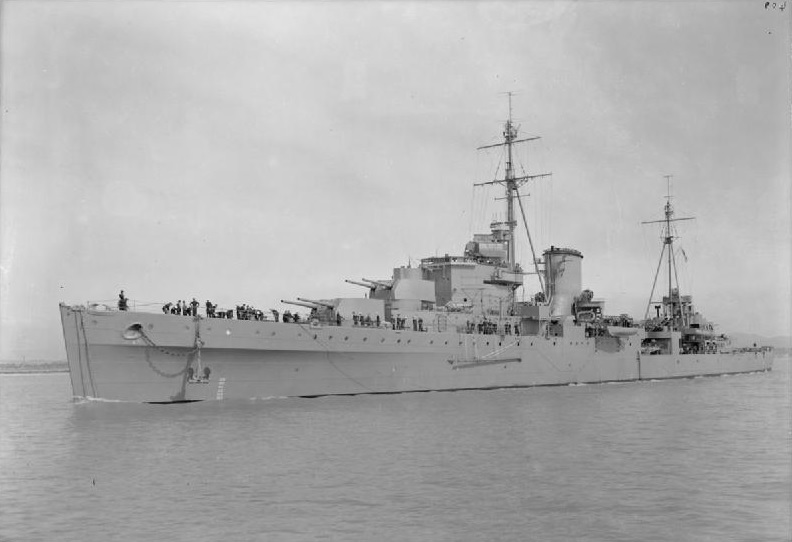
The cruiser HMS Orion, Tovey's flagship as second-in-command of the Mediterranean Fleet

In his first action in the Mediterranean, Tovey commanded the 7th Cruiser Squadron when, on 28 June 1940, it intercepted three Italian destroyers that were making an urgent supply run to north Africa (Battle of the Espero Convoy). (Note: At this stage, the 7th Cruiser Squadron consisted of HMS Orion, Liverpool, Gloucester, Neptune and HMAS Sydney. The three Italian destroyers were the Espero, Ostro and Zeffiro.) The five British cruisers engaged the Italian flotilla at extreme range and sank the Espero, while the other two escaped. The British use of ammunition had been extensive and, due to this and the shortage of stores at Alexandria, convoys from Malta were postponed. Cunningham was not pleased and commented that the ammunition used was "tremendous ... to sink this one 1,000-ton destroyer".

On 9 July, Tovey commanded the Light Forces (cruisers and destroyers) at the indecisive Battle of Calabria. Although little was achieved by either fleet, Tovey's handling of his command was praised in Cunningham's subsequent report. (Note: Cunningham reported: "Our cruisers – there were only four in action – were badly outnumbered and at times came under a very heavy fire. They were superbly handled by Vice-Admiral J. C. Tovey, C.B., D.S.O., who, by his skilful manoeuvring, managed to maintain a position in the van and to hold the enemy cruiser squadrons, and at the same time avoid damage to his own force.") In October 1940 he became commander of the 1st Battle Squadron.

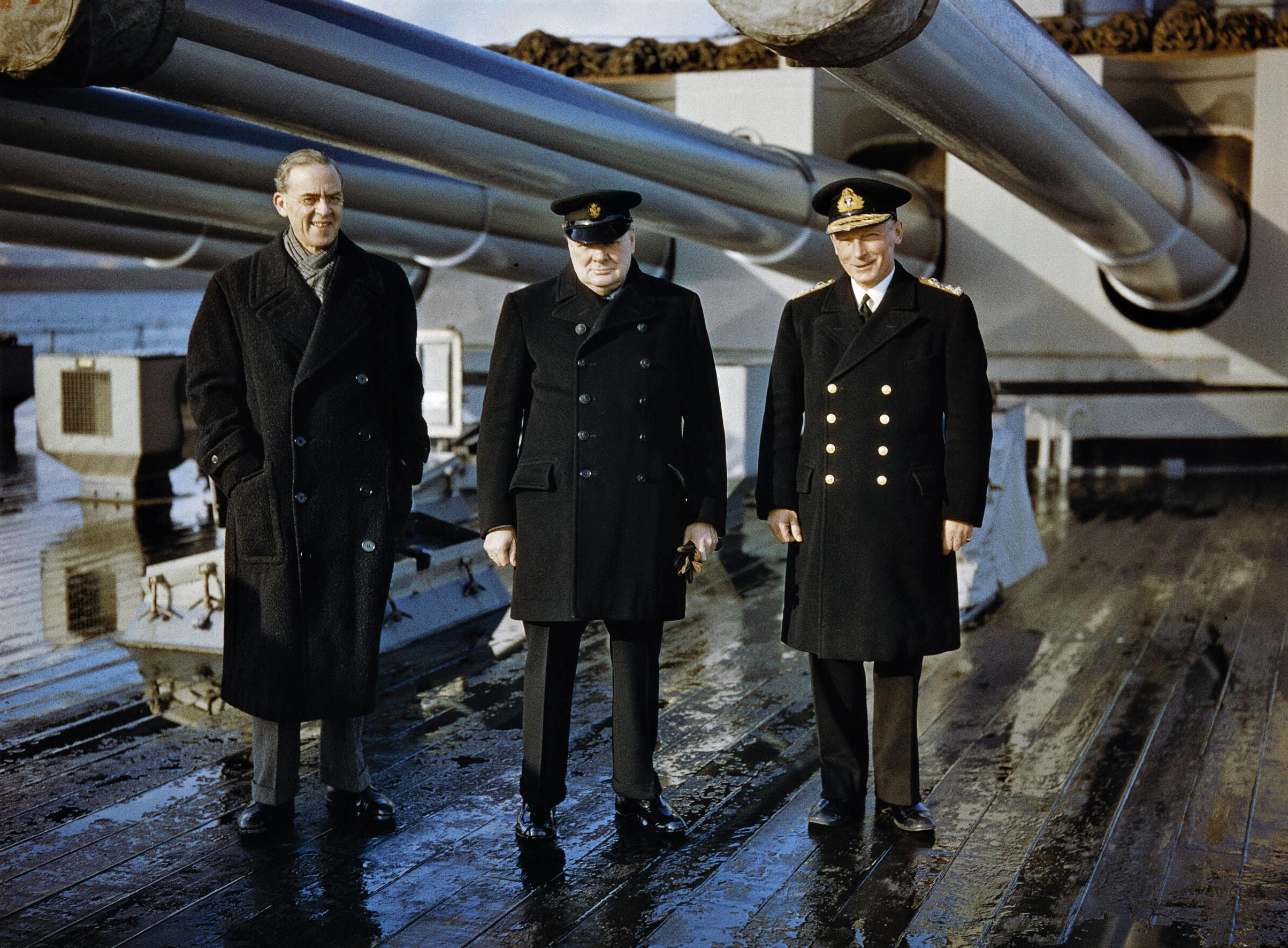
Admiral Tovey with Winston Churchill and Sir Stafford Cripps.

In November 1940 Tovey was appointed Commander-in-Chief of the Home Fleet with the acting rank of admiral (he was promoted to the substantive rank on 30 October 1942). As commander of the Home Fleet he had several clashes with Dudley Pound, the First Sea Lord, and Winston Churchill but retained the post for the normal two and a half years' duration.

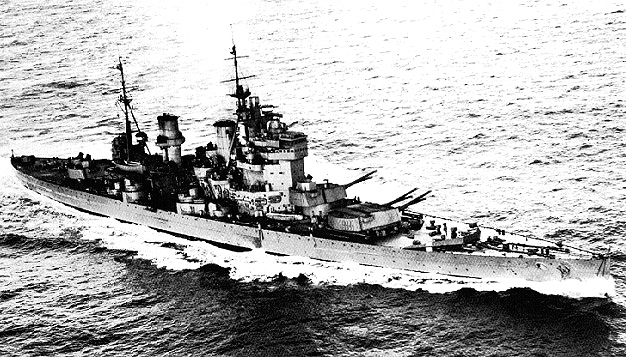
The battleship HMS King George V, one of the ships which sank the Bismarck

Tovey's best known achievement in this period was orchestrating the pursuit and destruction of the Bismarck. He had insisted on being a "sea-going" admiral, despite pressure from above and the disadvantages of being away from command centres. He believed that this was one element in maintaining morale in the fleet, by sharing the privations and dangers of his men. The final action against the Bismarck added further weight to his decision. When the two British battleships HMS Rodney and King George V located Bismarck, they had the setting sun silhouetting them while Bismarck remained in the evening gloom. Tovey observed this and, to the surprise of his staff, ordered that the final action be delayed until the following morning. In so doing, he ensured that the benefits of the light would be reversed to the British advantage and that the German crews would be fatigued by constant harassment by Vian's destroyers. The risk was that Bismarck would, somehow, escape but Tovey accepted this. Tovey was made a KBE "... for distinguished services in the masterly and determined action in which the German Battleship Bismarck was destroyed."

After the Bismarck action, Tovey resisted moves to court-martial the Prince of Wales' captain, John Leach, and Frederic Wake-Walker, the admiral commanding Suffolk and Norfolk, who had broken off the battle with Bismarck after Hood had been sunk. Tovey was appalled and a row ensued between Tovey and his superior, Pound. Tovey stated that the two officers had acted correctly in the circumstances. He threatened to resign his position and appear at any court-martial as 'defendant's friend' and defence witness. No more was heard of the proposal. (Note: Kennedy expounds on the court-martial claim via the epilogue in Pursuit – The Sinking of the Bismarck. According to Kennedy the claim for a proposal to court martial Leach and Wake-Walker came from post-war letters written by Admiral Tovey, after he retired, and not from Admiralty sources. Kennedy states in his epilogue that "...later in life Tovey's memory let him down..." and that plus the fact that Leach and Wake-Walker were retained in their commands and given commendations must cast considerable doubt on the court martial proposal.) King George V was extremely short of fuel and had stayed at the scene far longer than Tovey had thought it could, so another cause for friction between Tovey and his political and professional superiors was a signal that his flagship was to remain in action until Bismarck had sunk, "Bismarck must be sunk at all costs ... even if it ... means towing King George V". In these circumstances it would have been highly likely that the ship would have been lost to either U-boats or aircraft. The signal had initially caused amusement amongst Tovey and his staff, but later its risks and implications angered them; Tovey later said "It was the stupidest and most ill-considered signal ever made" and he made it clear that he would have disobeyed and risked court-martial.

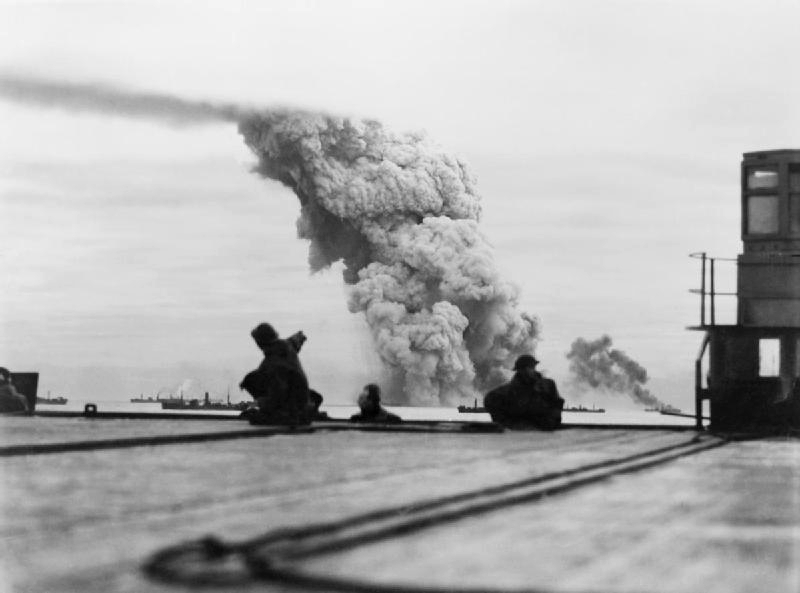
The escort carrier HMS Avenger forming part of arctic convoy PQ18

Tovey also had responsibility for the safe passage of the Arctic Convoys to Russia. The Soviet Union subsequently awarded him the Order of Suvorov, First Class, for "distinguished services in securing the passage of convoys to the U.S.S.R.", but Tovey never wore the medal or its ribbon. (Note: The reasons for Tovey's disregard of the Soviet decoration are not known. It may, however, be relevant that the Soviet armed forces offered little protection to the Arctic convoys and obstructed the essential support of the escorting British naval forces in northern Russia.) He had repeated disagreements with Pound and Churchill over the conduct of these convoys, arguing that summer operations were too dangerous due to the long daylight hours and the lack of air cover. The disastrous PQ17 convoy, in June and July 1942, demonstrated the validity of Tovey's fears, exacerbated by Pound's poor decision to scatter the convoy. Arctic convoys were suspended until September, when close air cover was available and darkness offered protection. (Note: The new escort carrier HMS Avenger had become available and formed the core of the escorting force. The convoy had been postponed until escorting warships had been freed from Operation Pedestal.)

Despite these serious differences and although Churchill considered Tovey to be "obstructionist" and attempted to get him sacked, Tovey lasted the full two and a half years of his appointment. At the end of this appointment, when departing Scapa, Tovey was carried to Thurso by HMS Onslow, the latter namesake of his notable World War I command. In June 1943, Tovey became Commander-in-Chief, The Nore, with responsibility for controlling the east coast convoys and organising minesweeping operations. He was promoted to Admiral of the Fleet on 22 October 1943. Other major responsibilities were the organisation of the logistics for the forthcoming Allied invasion of Sicily and the Normandy landings. He was appointed as First and Principal Naval ADC to the King in January 1945.

== Retirement ==
Tovey retired from the service early in 1946 and was ennobled as Baron Tovey, of Langton Matravers in the County of Dorset on 15 February 1946. In retirement, Tovey took up a number of appointments; his seat in the House of Lords, Third Church Estates Commissioner (1948–1952), President of The Royal Naval Benevolent Trust and of the King George's Fund for Sailors and President of the Shaftesbury Training Ships. These kept him so busy that he had little time for his pastimes of golf and fishing. His wife, Aida, suffered from arthritis and, as the condition worsened, Tovey gave up his external activities to devote his time to caring for her. He died at Funchal, Madeira on 12 January 1971. His wife, Aida, had died the preceding June, and both are buried at Godlingston Cemetery (plot B500) just outside Swanage. The couple had had no children, and his peerage became extinct on his death.

== Family ==
On 28 March 1916, Tovey married Aida Rowe, daughter of John Rowe, at Linlithgow. They had no children.

== Character ==
Confidential reports on Tovey by his commanding officers shine a light on his personality and his abilities. In his early years in the Navy, the most used adjective was "zealous" and in later years, he was consistently praised for his ability and potential. In two instances, in command of a destroyer flotilla and of HMS Rodney, his impact on the efficiency of his command was noted. Tovey's ability to command respect was also commended.

There are several documented illustrations of Tovey's willingness to confront higher authorities when he believed it was right to do so. An early example was when, as a midshipman on the Exmouth supervising the handling of ships' boats, a superior officer started to give the orders. Tovey "peeled off his white gloves, unbuckled his sword belt, handed them to the astonished Commander and went below."

While in command of HMS Rodney, Tovey did not always see eye to eye with his Commander-in-Chief and was inclined to express his views forcibly. In later years he often quoted one paragraph from Sir John Kelly's confidential report: "Captain Tovey shares one characteristic with me. In myself I call it tenacity of purpose; in Captain Tovey I can only describe it as sheer bloody obstinacy".

== Honours and awards ==
Knight Grand Cross of the Order of the Bath (GCB)	(13 April 1943)
Knight Commander of the Order of the Bath (KCB)	(1 January 1941)
Companion of the Order of the Bath (CB)	(29 January 1937)
Knight Commander of the Order of the British Empire (KBE)	(14 October 1941)
Companion of the Distinguished Service Order (DSO)	(10 July 1919)
Order of St. Anna 3rd class (with swords)	(Russian Empire) (awarded 1 October 1917)
1914–1918 War Cross	(France) (2 November 1917)
Order of Suvorov 1st Class	(USSR) (29 February 1944)
Commander of the Legion of Merit	(United States) (28 May 1946)
Grand Cross of the Order of the Phoenix	(Greece) (15 April 1947)

== Sources ==
- Howarth, Stephen (1994). The Battle of the Atlantic 1939–1945: the 50th anniversary International Naval Conference Part 770 of The Battle of the Atlantic, 1939–1945: The 50th Anniversary International Naval Conference. Greenhill. ISBN 978-1-55750-058-8.
- Kennedy, Ludovic (1974). Pursuit – The Sinking of the Bismarck. Book Club Associates. ISBN 978-0-0063-4014-0.
- Woodman, Richard (2000). Malta Convoys 1940–1943. London: John Murray. ISBN 978-0-7195-6408-6.

Military offices
Preceded by Sir Charles Forbes	Commander-in-Chief, Home Fleet; 1940–1942	Succeeded by Sir Bruce Fraser
Preceded by Sir George Lyon	Commander-in-Chief, The Nore; 1943–1946	Succeeded by Sir Harold Burrough
Honorary titles
Preceded by Sir Percy Noble	First and Principal Naval Aide-de-Camp; 1945–1946	Succeeded by The Lord Fraser of North Cape
Church of England titles
Preceded by The Lord Daryngton	Third Church Estates Commissioner; 1948–1952	Succeeded by Sir Malcolm Trustram Eve
Peerage of the United Kingdom
New creation	Baron Tovey; 1946–1971	Extinct
