= HMS Seawolf (1918) =

Royal Navy S class destroyer

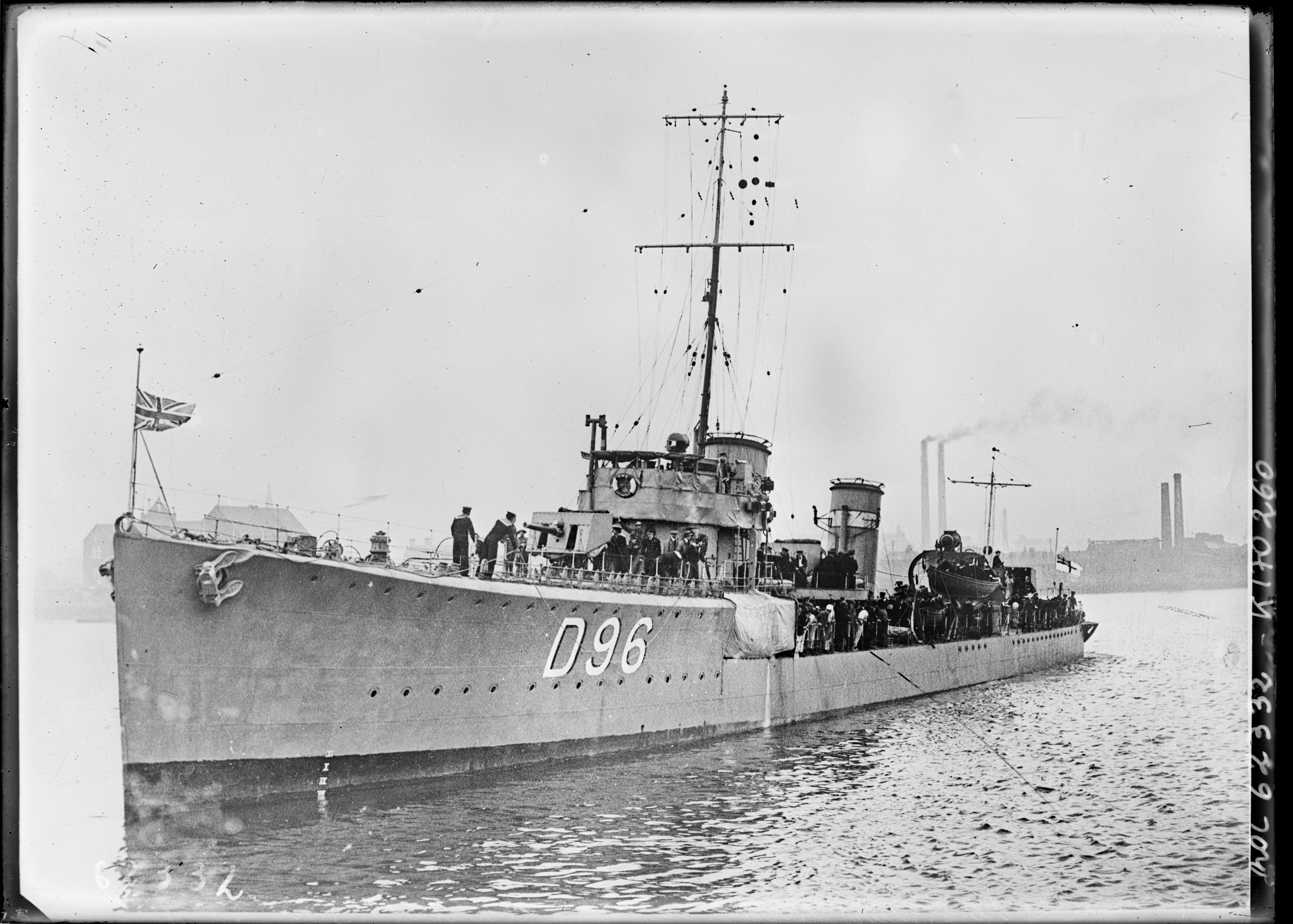

History

United Kingdom
- Name: HMS Seawolf
- Ordered: June 1917
- Builder: John Brown & Company
- Yard number: 480
- Laid down: 30 April 1918
- Launched: 2 November 1918
- Completed: 28 January 1919
- Out of service: 23 February 1931
- Fate: Sold to be broken up

General characteristics
- Class & type: S-class destroyer
- Displacement: 1,075 long tons (1,092 t) normal; 1,221 long tons (1,241 t) deep load
- Length: 265 ft (80.8 m) p.p.
- Beam: 26 ft 9 in (8.15 m)
- Draught: 9 ft 10 in (3.00 m) mean
- Installed power: 3 Yarrow boilers, 27,000 shp (20,134 kW)
- Propulsion: 2 geared Brown-Curtis steam turbines, 2 shafts
- Speed: 36 knots (41.4 mph; 66.7 km/h)
- Range: 2,750 nmi (5,090 km) at 15 kn (28 km/h)
- Complement: 90
- Armament: 3 × single QF 4 in (102 mm) guns; 1 × single 2-pdr 40 mm (2 in) Mk. II AA gun; 2 × twin 21 in (533 mm) torpedo tubes; 4 × depth charge chutes

HMS Seawolf was an S-class destroyer that served with the Royal Navy in the twentieth century. Launched in 1918 just before the end of the First World War, the warship initially joined the torpedo school at Devonport before, in 1919, serving briefly in the Latvian War of Independence. Subsequently deployed to Ireland, the vessel carried some of the bodies of those killed in Bloody Sunday to their funerals in 1920 and, in 1924, rescued the passengers and crew of the steamship Asian that had sunk in a storm near Queenstown. After the London Naval Treaty of 1930 restricted the tonnage of destroyers operated by the Navy, Seawolf was retired and, in 1931, was sold to be broken up.

== Design and development ==
Seawolf was one of 33 Admiralty S class destroyers ordered by the British Admiralty in June 1917 as part of the Twelfth War Construction Programme. The design was a development of the R class introduced as a cheaper and faster alternative to the V and W class. Differences with the R class were minor, such as having the searchlight further aft.

Seawolf had an overall length of 276 ft (84 m) and a length of 265 ft (81 m) between perpendiculars. The beam was 26 ft 9 in (8.15 m) and draught 9 ft 10 in (3.00 m). Displacement was 1,075 long tons (1,092 t) normal and 1,221 long tons (1,241 t) deep load. Three Yarrow boilers fed steam to two sets of Brown-Curtis geared steam turbines rated at 27,000 shaft horsepower (20,000 kW) and driving two shafts, giving a design speed of 36 knots (67 km/h; 41 mph) at normal loading and 32.5 knots (60.2 km/h; 37.4 mph) at deep load. Two funnels were fitted. A full load of 301 long tons (306 t) of fuel oil was carried, which gave a design range of 2,750 nautical miles (5,090 km; 3,160 mi) at 15 knots (28 km/h; 17 mph).

Armament consisted of three QF 4 in (102 mm) Mk IV guns on the ship's centreline. One was mounted raised on the forecastle, one on a platform between the funnels and one aft. The ship also mounted a single 2-pounder 40 mm (1.6 in) "pom-pom" anti-aircraft gun for air defence. Four 21 in (533 mm) torpedo tubes were carried in two twin rotating mounts aft. Four depth charge chutes were also fitted aft. Typically ten depth charges were carried. The ship was designed to mount two additional 18 in (457 mm) torpedo tubes either side of the superstructure but this required the forecastle plating to be cut away, causing excess water to come aboard at sea, so they were removed. The weight saved enabled the heavier Mark V 21-inch torpedo to be carried. Fire control included a training-only director, single Dumaresq and a Vickers range clock. The ship had a complement of 90 officers and ratings.

== Construction and career ==
One of nine of the class to be built by the shipyard,Seawolf was laid down on 30 April 1918 by John Brown & Company in Clydebank with the yard number 480, launched on 2 November shortly before the Armistice that ended the First World War and completed on 28 January the following year. The vessel was the first that served in the Royal Navy to be named Seawolf. Completed on 28 January the following year, Seawolf was commissioned and joined the torpedo school at Devonport. The vessel did not receive a full crew until 20 October.

The destroyer joined the Fourth Destroyer Flotilla of the Atlantic Fleet. Although the war had finished, the escalating civil war in Russia continued. The United Kingdom decided to send units of the Royal Navy into the Baltic Sea to monitor the situation. Soon into the campaign, it became clear that the Russians were planning to occupy the Baltic state of Latvia and integrate it into the new Soviet Union. The fleet was therefore tasked with not simply helping to help organise the evacuation of German forces from the country but also support their War of independence. This was achieved on 14 November when Latvia secured its independence. On 28 December, the destroyer, along with sister ships Sardonyx and Tenedos, left the capital of Tallinn and sailed home, arriving in Rosyth on 4 January the following year.

On 13 February 1920, the ship started a tour of Germany, initially visiting Flensburg, leaving the following day for Wilhelmshaven and arriving in Hamburg four days later, returning to the UK on 20 February. On 16 June, the destroyer visited Copenhagen. The vessel was subsequently deployed in Ireland. On 26 November, the warship carried the bodies of some of the bodies of those killed in Bloody Sunday to their funerals. On 1 August 1922, the future Admiral of the Fleet, John Tovey took command of the destroyer. On 17 September 1924, while based at Queenstown, Seawolf rescued the passengers and crew of the Leyland Line steamship Asian that went down in a storm. On 22 April 1930, the London Naval Treaty was signed, which limited total destroyer tonnage in the Royal Navy. The force was looking to introduce more modern destroyers and so needed to retire some of the older vessels. Seawolf was retired and, on 23 February 1931, sold to John Cashmore Ltd to be broken up at Newport, Wales.

== Pennant numbers ==
Pennant number	Date
G47	September 1918
D96	November 1919
H07	January 1922
