= HMS Onslow (1916) =

Admiralty M-class destroyer

History

United Kingdom
- Name: HMS Onslow
- Builder: Fairfield Shipbuilding and Engineering Company, Govan
- Launched: 15 February 1916
- Completed: By 15 April 1916
- Fate: Sold for scrapping on 26 October 1921

General characteristics
- Class & type: Admiralty M-class destroyer
- Displacement: 971 long tons (987 t)
- Length: 273 ft 4 in (83.31 m) o/a
- Beam: 26 ft 8 in (8.13 m)
- Draught: 9 ft 8 in (2.95 m)
- Installed power: 25,000 shp (19,000 kW); 4 × Yarrow boilers
- Propulsion: 3 Shafts; 3 steam turbines
- Speed: 34 knots (63 km/h; 39 mph)
- Range: 2,100 nmi (3,900 km; 2,400 mi) at 15 knots (28 km/h; 17 mph)
- Complement: 76
- Armament: 3 × QF 4-inch (102 mm) Mark IV guns; 2 × QF 1.5-pounder (37 mm) or QF 2-pounder (40 mm) "pom-pom" anti-aircraft guns; 2 × twin 21-inch (533 mm) torpedo tubes

HMS Onslow was an Admiralty M-class destroyer built for the Royal Navy during the First World War. She took part in the Battle of Jutland in 1916 and was sold for scrap in 1921.

== Description ==
The Admiralty M class were improved and faster versions of the preceding Laforey-class destroyer. They displaced 971 long tons (987 t). The ships had an overall length of 273 feet 4 inches (83.3 m), a beam of 26 feet 8 inches (8.1 m) and a draught of 9 feet 8 inches (2.9 m). They were powered by three Parsons direct-drive steam turbines, each driving one propeller shaft, using steam provided by four Yarrow boilers. The turbines developed a total of 25,000 shaft horsepower (19,000 kW) and gave a maximum speed of 34 knots (63 km/h; 39 mph). The ships carried a maximum of 237 long tons (241 t) of fuel oil that gave them a range of 2,100 nautical miles (3,900 km; 2,400 mi) at 15 knots (28 km/h; 17 mph). The ships' complement was 76 officers and ratings.

The ships were armed with three single QF 4-inch (102 mm) Mark IV guns and two QF 1.5-pounder (37 mm) anti-aircraft guns. These latter guns were later replaced by a pair of QF 2-pounder (40 mm) "pom-pom" anti-aircraft guns. The ships were also fitted with two above water twin mounts for 21-inch (533 mm) torpedoes.

== Construction and service ==
Onslow was ordered under the Third War Programme in November 1914 and built by Fairfield Shipbuilding & Engineering Company at Govan. The ship was launched on 15 February 1916 and completed in April 1916. Her first commander was John Tovey, (later Admiral of the Fleet). On 24 April 1916, the Easter Rising against British rule broke out in Ireland. Two infantry brigades were ordered from Liverpool to Dublin to reinforce the British forces, with Onslow escorting the transports carrying these troops.

Onslow saw action at the Battle of Jutland and was badly damaged, with her speed reduced to 10 knots (19 km/h; 12 mph). Tovey pressed home the attack against first a cruiser and then a line of battlecruisers. The ship was brought back to Aberdeen despite the damage, having been towed out of action by the destroyer HMS Defender, under heavy fire. The report on the battle by Admiral Beatty stated that:

Defender, whose speed had been reduced to 10 knots, while on the disengaged side of the battle cruisers, was struck by a shell which damaged her foremost boiler, but closed Onslow and took her in tow. Shells were falling all round them during this operation, which, however, was successfully accomplished. During the heavy weather of the ensuing night the tow parted twice, but was resecured. The two struggled on together until 1pm 1st June, when Onslow was transferred to tugs. I consider the performances of these two destroyers to be gallant in the extreme, and I am recommending Lieutenant-Commander J. C. Tovey of Onslow, and Lieutenant Commander Palmer of Defender, for special recognition...

— Admiral David Beatty

Both officers were awarded DSOs.

Onslow was sold for breaking up on 26 October 1921.

== Bibliography ==
- Colledge, J. J.; Warlow, Ben (2006) [1969]. Ships of the Royal Navy: The Complete Record of All Fighting Ships of the Royal Navy from the 15th Century to the Present (3rd Rev ed.). London: Chatham Publishing. ISBN 978-1-86176-281-8. OCLC 67375475.
- Dittmar, F.J. & Colledge, J.J. (1972). British Warships 1914–1919. Shepperton, UK: Ian Allan. ISBN 0-7110-0380-7.
- Friedman, Norman (2009). British Destroyers: From Earliest Days to the Second World War. Barnsley, UK: Seaforth Publishing. ISBN 978-1-84832-049-9.
- Gardiner, Robert & Gray, Randal (1985). Conway's All The World's Fighting Ships 1906–1921. London: Conway Maritime Press. ISBN 0-85177-245-5.
- March, Edgar J. (1966). British Destroyers: A History of Development, 1892–1953; Drawn by Admiralty Permission From Official Records & Returns, Ships' Covers & Building Plans. London: Seeley Service. OCLC 164893555.
- Monograph No. 31: Home Waters—Part VI.: From October 1915 to May 1916 (PDF). Naval Staff Monographs (Historical). Vol. XV. The Naval Staff, Training and Staff Duties Division. 1926.
