= Trevylyan Napier =

Royal Navy Vice-Admiral (1867–1920)

Vice-Admiral Sir Trevylyan Napier KCB MVO
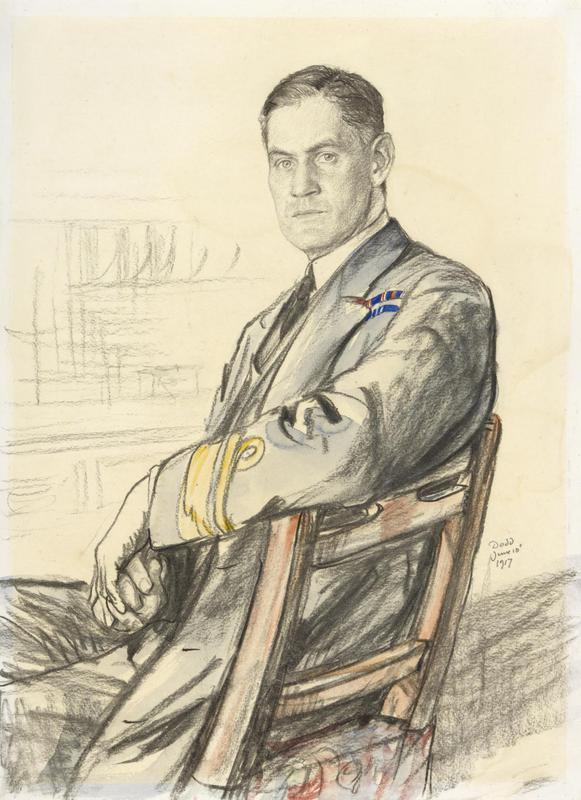
- Rear-admiral Trevylyan Dacres Willes Napier by Francis Dodd
- Born: Trevylyan Dacres Willes Napier; 19 April 1867
- Died: 30 July 1920 (aged 53)
- Spouse: Mary Elizabeth Culme-Seymour (m. 1899)
- Military career
- Allegiance: United Kingdom
- Branch: Royal Navy
- Service years: 1887–1920
- Rank: Vice-Admiral
- Commands: North America and West Indies Station
- Conflicts: World War I; Battle of Jutland; Second Battle of Heligoland Bight
- Awards: Knight Commander of the Order of the Bath; Member of the Royal Victorian Order

Vice-Admiral Sir Trevylyan Dacres Willes Napier KCB MVO (19 April 1867 – 30 July 1920) was a Royal Navy officer who went on to be Commander-in-Chief, America and West Indies Station.

== Naval career ==
Napier was the son of Ella Louisa (Wilson) and Vice-Admiral Gerard John Napier. He joined the Royal Navy. He was promoted to the rank of lieutenant on 14 December 1887, and to commander on 1 January 1889. In April 1902 he was posted to the HMY Victoria and Albert, the King's personal yacht, where he was second in command. Promoted to captain in June 1903, he was appointed in command of the HMY Victoria and Albert later that year and the battleship HMS Bellerophon in 1911. Promoted to rear admiral in November 1913, he was based at the Royal Naval War College, then in Portsmouth, from 1913 and tested the mobilisation of the Home Fleet in June and July 1914.

Napier saw active service in the First World War, from December 1914 commanding the 2nd Light Cruiser Squadron and then from February 1915, the 3rd Light Cruiser Squadron, seeing action at the Battle of Jutland in May 1916, before taking command of the 1st Light Cruiser Squadron in July 1917, and taking part in the Second Battle of Heligoland Bight in November 1917. He commanded the whole Light Cruiser Force from January 1918 to April 1919.

He was appointed Commander-in-Chief, America and West Indies Station in December 1919 but died in office of typhoid fever at Admiralty House, Bermuda during the following July. He is buried at the Royal Naval Cemetery of the Royal Naval Dockyard on Ireland Island, Bermuda.

== Family ==
In 1911, both Napier's wife, Mary, and her father, Sir Michael Culme-Seymour, 3rd Baronet, were witnesses in the criminal libel trial of Edward Mylius, who had written about a rumoured 1890 marriage of the future George V to one of the Baronet's daughters, which would have made the king a bigamist (Mylius was convicted).

Military offices
Preceded by Sir Morgan Singer	Commander-in-Chief, North America and West Indies Station; 1919–1920	Succeeded by Sir William Pakenham
